= Rib vault =

Architectural feature to cover a wide space

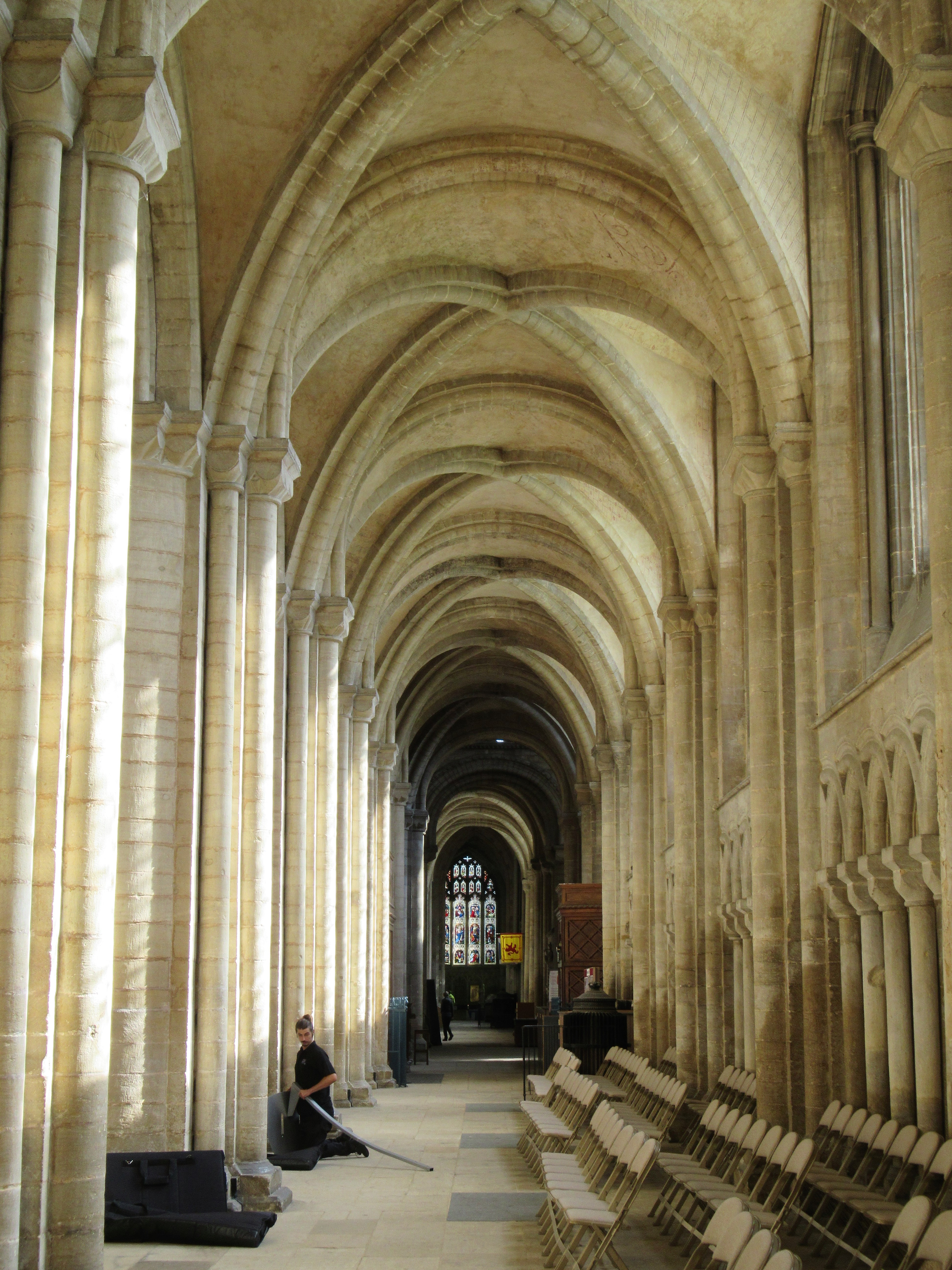
Romanesque rib vaulting, Peterborough Cathedral (begun 1118) south aisle

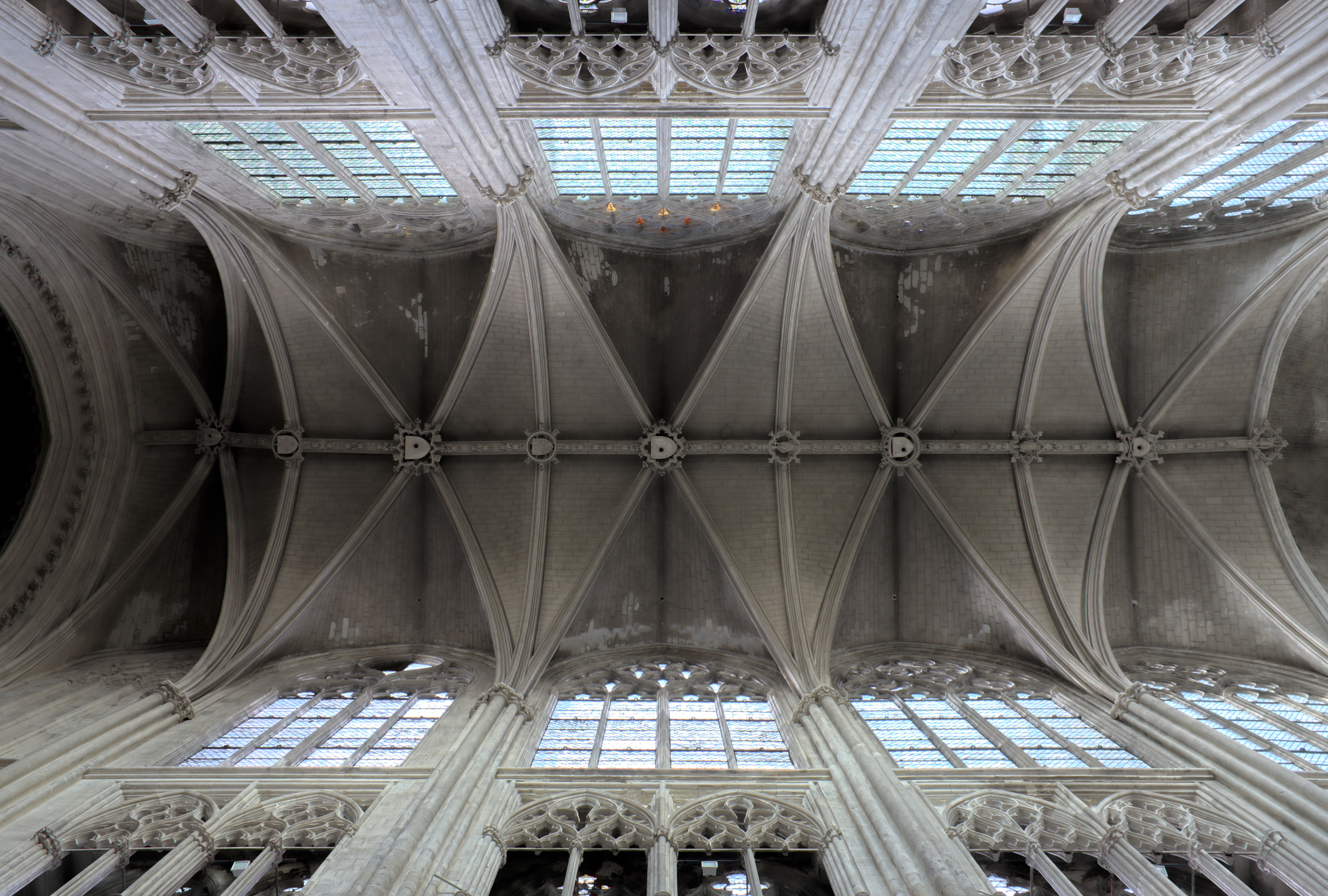
Gothic rib vaulting, Tours Cathedral, nave

A rib vault or ribbed vault is an architectural feature for covering a wide space, such as a church nave, composed of a framework of crossed or diagonal arched ribs. Variations were used in Roman architecture, Byzantine architecture, Islamic architecture, Romanesque architecture, and especially Gothic architecture. Thin stone panels fill the space between the ribs. This greatly reduced the weight and thus the outward thrust of the vault. The ribs transmit the load downward and outward to specific points, usually rows of columns or piers. This feature allowed architects of Gothic cathedrals to make higher and thinner walls and much larger windows.

It is a type of arcuated, or arched, vault in which the severies, or panels in the bays of the vault's underside are separated from one another by ribs which conceal the groins, or the intersections of the panels. Rib vaults are, like groin vaults, formed from two intersecting barrel vaults; the ribs conceal the junction of the vaults.

The first rib vaults were built by the ancient Romans in the 2nd century AD. In the medieval period the earliest surviving example in Islamic architecture is at the Mosque–Cathedral of Córdoba in al-Andalus, which predates the earliest Romanesque examples by a century. An alternative to barrel vaults in the naves of churches, rib vaults in 12th century early Gothic architecture began to be used in vaults made with pointed arches, already known in the Romanesque style. In these vaults, as in groin vaults, the weight was directed it to the corners, where piers, columns, or walls could support it. Walls in Gothic buildings were often abutted by flying buttresses. These elements made it possible to construct buildings with much higher and thinner walls than before, with immense bays, and larger stained glass windows filling the structure with light.

Cross vaults are constructed of narrow, arched ribs that diagonally cross the area to be covered. The severies can be filled with small pieces of masonry, eliminating much of the massive weight of barrel vaults. These rib vaults could also more efficiently cover large rectangular areas. Thanks to the pointed arch employed in Gothic architecture, builders could raise or lower the arches so they would have the same height for a short span or a long span, something not possible with round arches. Pointed arches also made two intersecting vaults of the same height but different widths easier to construct.

== History ==
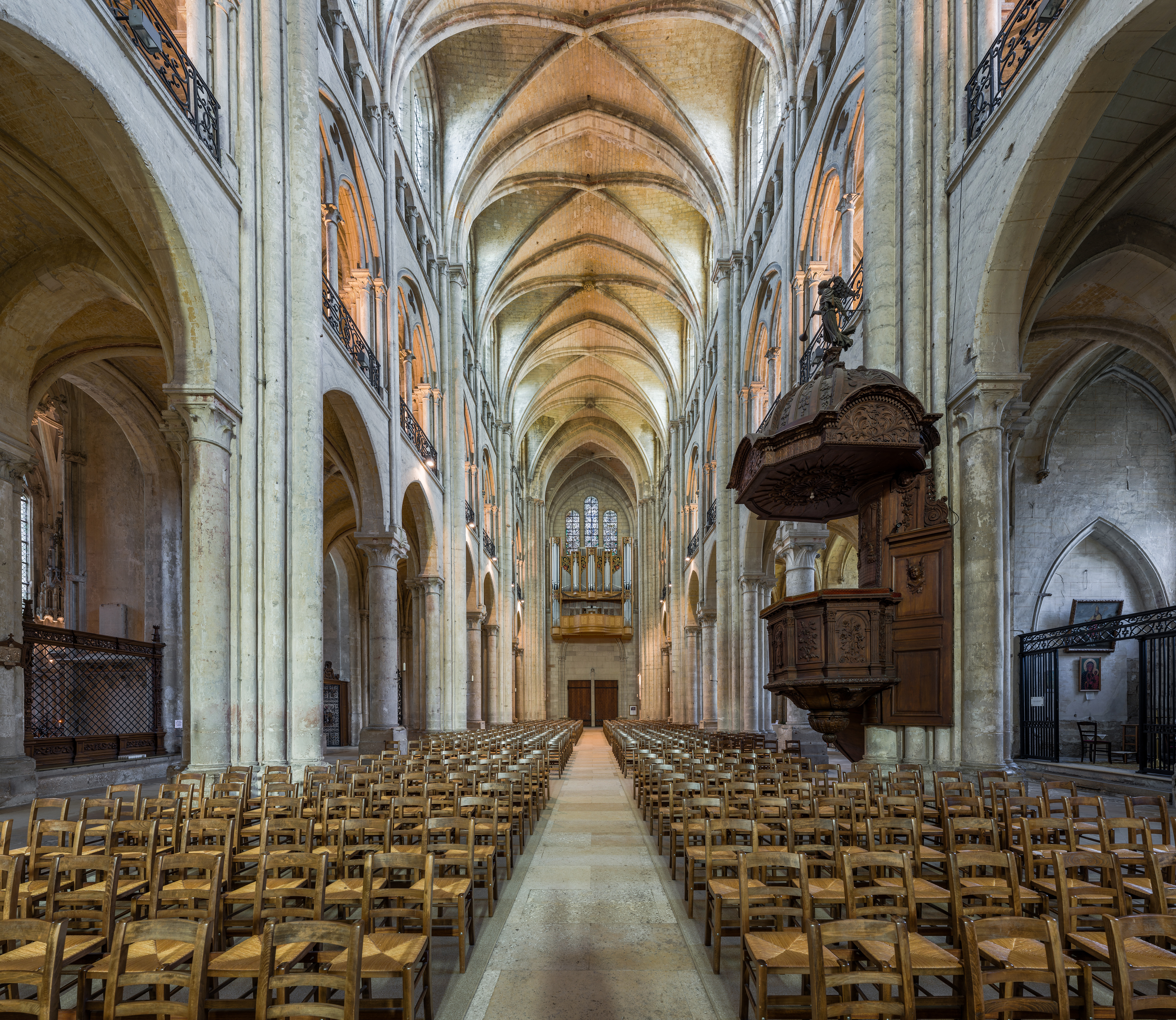
Rib vaulted ceiling of Noyon Cathedral, one of the first Gothic cathedrals built in France

The Romans used an early version of the rib vault to strengthen groin vaults. In these Roman vaults, the brick ribs were embedded into the concrete of the vault. This was different from the later Gothic vaults, where the ribs were separate from the infilling of the panels, which gave the Gothic vaults flexibility and thus greater strength. The Romans also used these embedded ribs concealed within the structure to strengthen the concrete surface of domes, such as the Pantheon.

Rib vaults were not common in masonry buildings in Byzantine architecture, but four ribbed vaults were built by the Hosios Loukas monastery in Byzantine Greece after 1000 AD, and at the now ruined town Çanlı Kilise in Byzantine Cappadocia several groin vaults in medieval churches are equipped with ribs. A number of other rib vaults were built in Greece under the Frankokratia after the Fourth Crusade. Varieties of early rib vaults were known in Lombard, Armenian, Persian, and Islamic architecture.

=== Roman architecture ===
The first known example of ladder ribs used on cross vaults is the one documented in the Villa of the Sette Bassi in Rome, dating from the mid-second century AD.

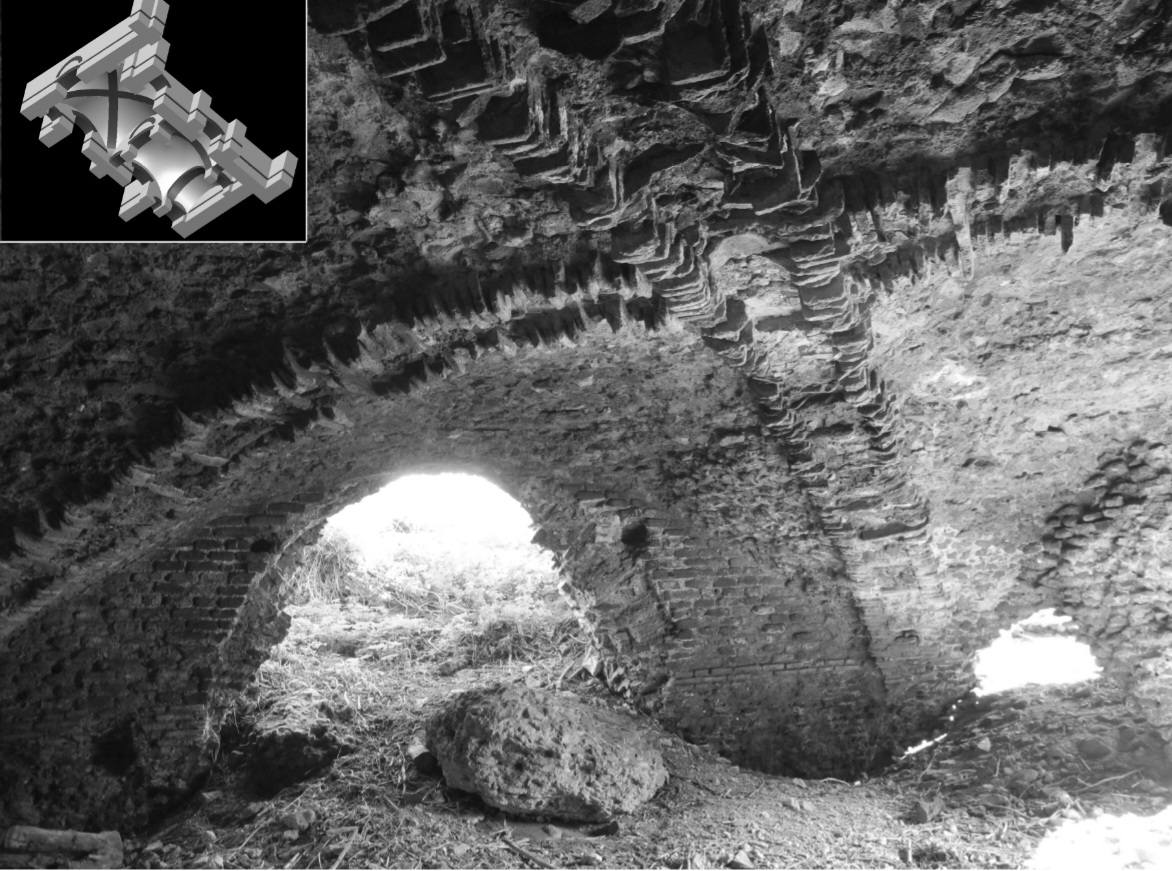
Rib vault from Villa Sette Bassi, Rome (c.150)

=== Islamic architecture ===
In the Moorish architecture of Spain, Islamic architects used these ribbed vaults more visibly. One notable example is found in the Great Mosque of Córdoba, which was begun in the 9th century and extended between 922 and 965 by Al-Hakam II. The Chapel of Villaviciosa, as this part of the mosque became known when it was converted to a Roman Catholic church in the 13th century, has a dome which rests upon ribs and pendentives. At each vertex of the square is the intersection with another arch, such that each intersection is the junction of three arches. At each corner is a further miniature cross-vault dome. In the other domes of the 10th century reconstruction of the Great Mosque, the ribs intersect one another off-centre, forming an eight-pointed star in the centre which is topped by a pendentive dome.

The crossed-arch vaults of the mosque-cathedral of Córdoba served as models for later mosque buildings in the Islamic West, including al-Andalus and the Maghreb. At around 1000 AD, the Mezquita de Bab al Mardum (Mosque of Cristo de la Luz) in Toledo was constructed with a similar, eight-ribbed vault. The dome is supported both by the ribs and by pendentives that transmit its weight to the walls below. Similar vaults are also seen in the mosque building of the Aljafería of Zaragoza. The architectural form of the ribbed vault was further developed in the Maghreb: the central dome of the Great Mosque of Tlemcen, a work of the Almoravids built in 1082, has twelve slender ribs, the shell between the ribs is filled with filigree stucco work. The Almohads also expanded its use to military structures, as exemplified in the Atalaya Castle in Villena.

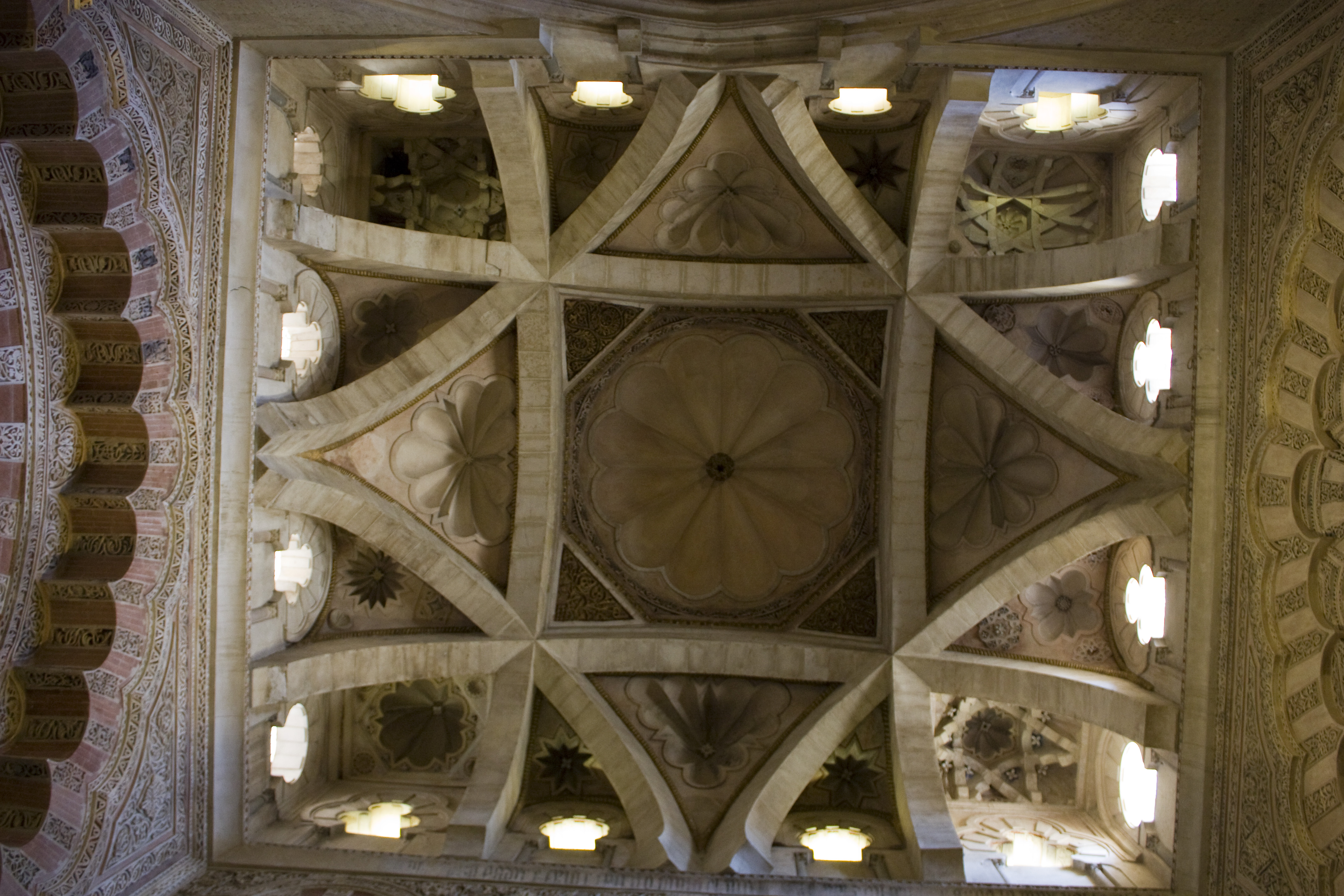
Chapel of Villaviciosa, Great Mosque of Cordoba (962–965)

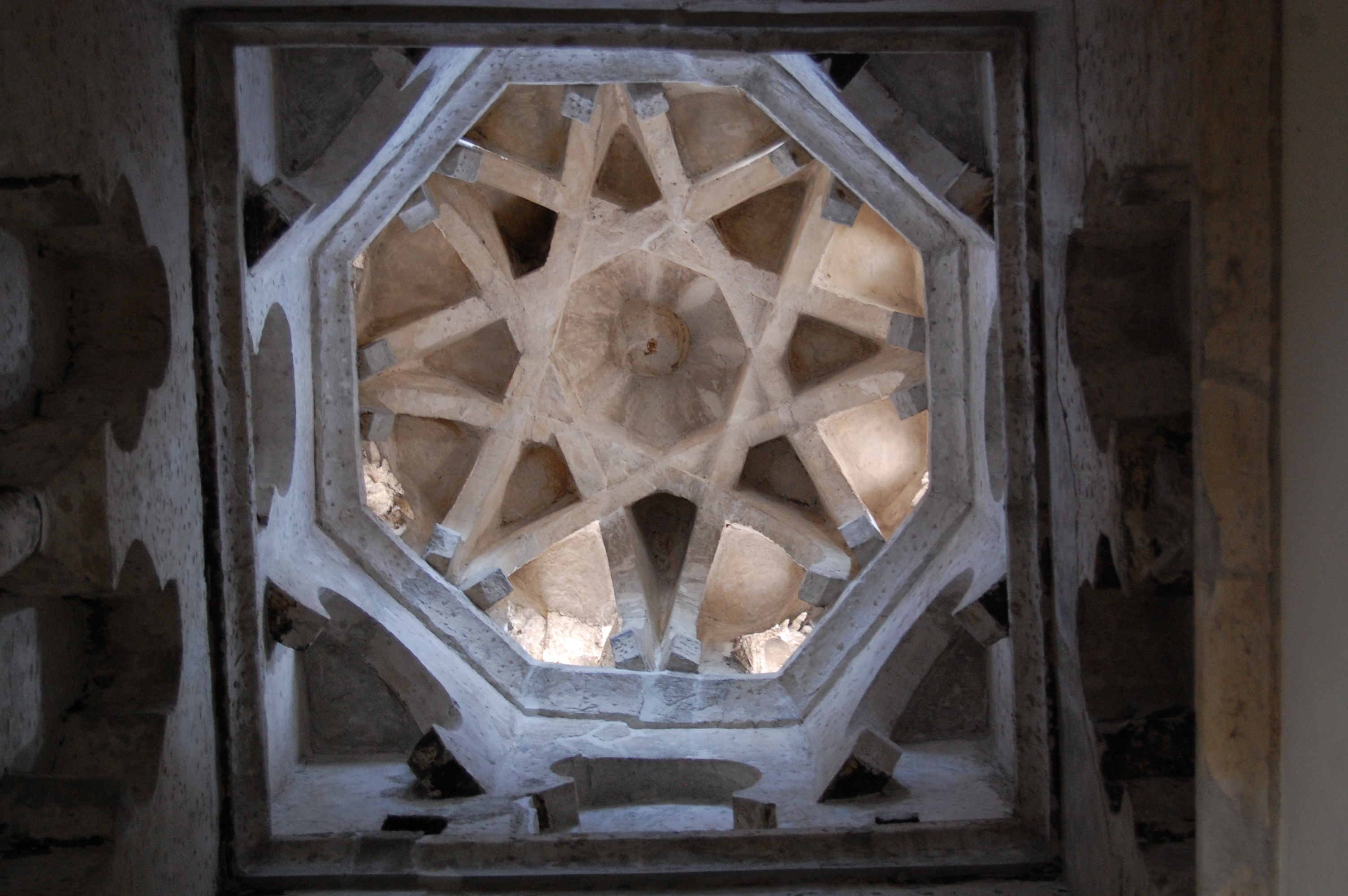
Mosque of Cristo de la Luz, Toledo, Spain (c. 1000)

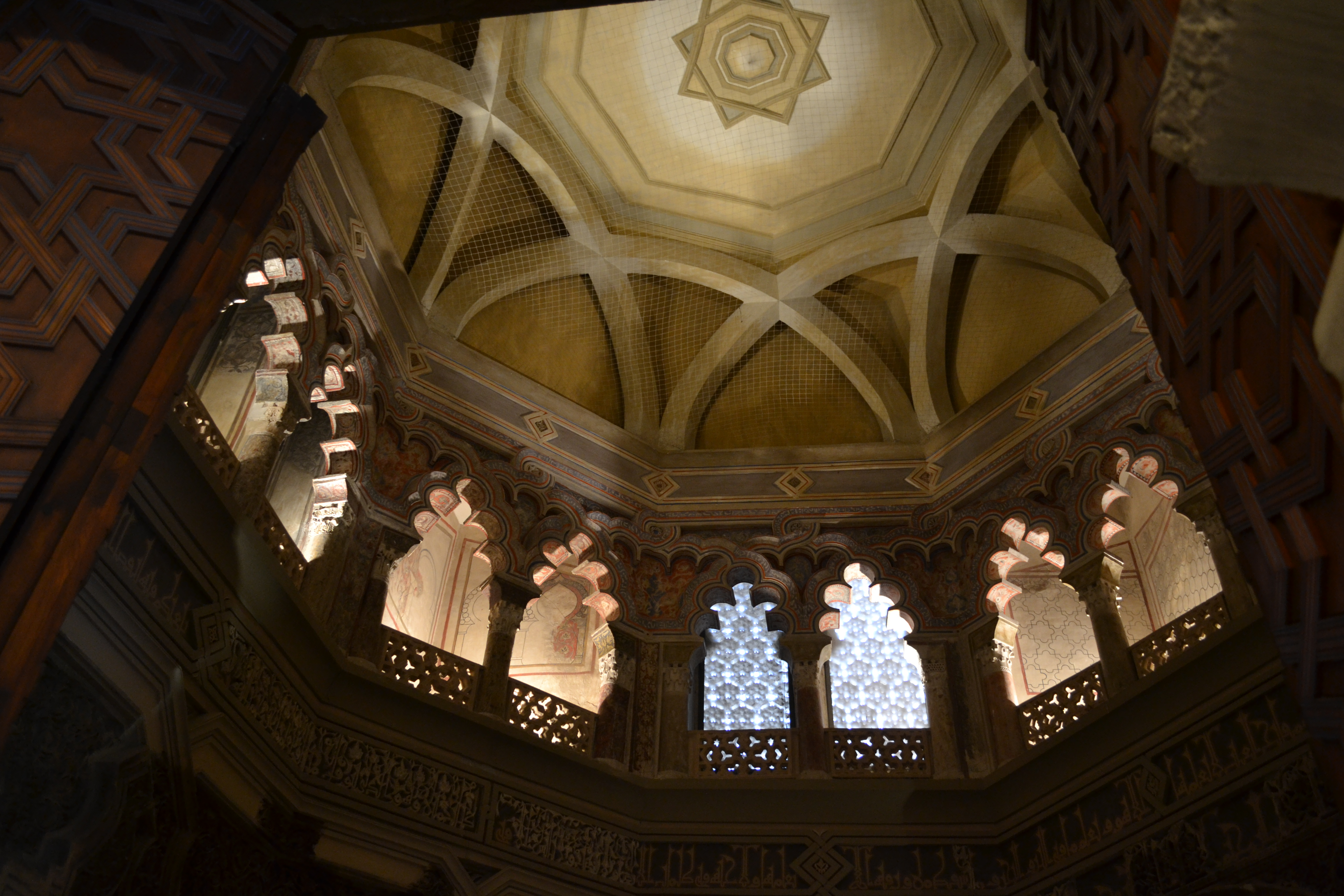
Aljafería of Zaragoza (11th century)

=== Romanesque architecture ===
Vaulting developed further in northern Europe in the 11th century, as builders sought a way to construct larger and larger stone vaults to replace the wooden roofs of Romanesque churches, which were frequently destroyed by fire. The increasing size and ambition of Romanesque churches (some of which, like Cluny Abbey and Winchester Cathedral, deliberately rivalled Old St Peter's Basilica in scale) led to innovation in vaulting throughout the 11th century, with masons trying several techniques to vault high naves. Some innovations, such as the early 11th century transverse barrel vaults at Tournus Abbey and the domes of Périgeux Cathedral, were to be dead ends, but by the end of the century both longitudinal barrel vaults and groin vaults had been raised over large churches. Barrel vaults were common in southern Europe, for example in Cluny Abbey and the pilgrimage churches on the route to Santiago de Compostela, but had the drawback of requiring continuous abutment along their length, necessitating thick walls and small or non-existent windows. At Cluny, this was ignored and a clerestory was built to bring in more light, but part of the vault soon collapsed and required remedial buttressing.

The use of the groin vault, formed at the intersection of two barrel vaults, partly alleviated these problems, as the vault's thrust was concentrated at the corners of each bay, allowing buttressing to be concentrated at those points and windows opened elsewhere. High groin vaults were developed in the 1090s at Speyer Cathedral, with transverse arches defining the bays. They were also used over the choir of the Abbey of Sainte-Trinité, Caen. However, groin vaults still posed serious constructional challenges. First, the two perpendicular barrels met at sharp angles, termed groins or arrises, which were difficult to form neatly in the rubble construction common in Romanesque architecture. This was partly resolved by covering the vaults with plaster and painted decoration, including rib-like motifs at the groins. Second, and more seriously, groin vaults could only be formed over square bays. This was acceptable in Germany, which had a tradition of double bays inherited from Ottonian architecture, but not elsewhere in Europe, particularly the territories ruled by the Normans.

Barrel vaulting in the cathedral of Santiago de Compostela. Note the lack of a clerestory.

Groin vaulting in Speyer Cathedral (1082-1103).

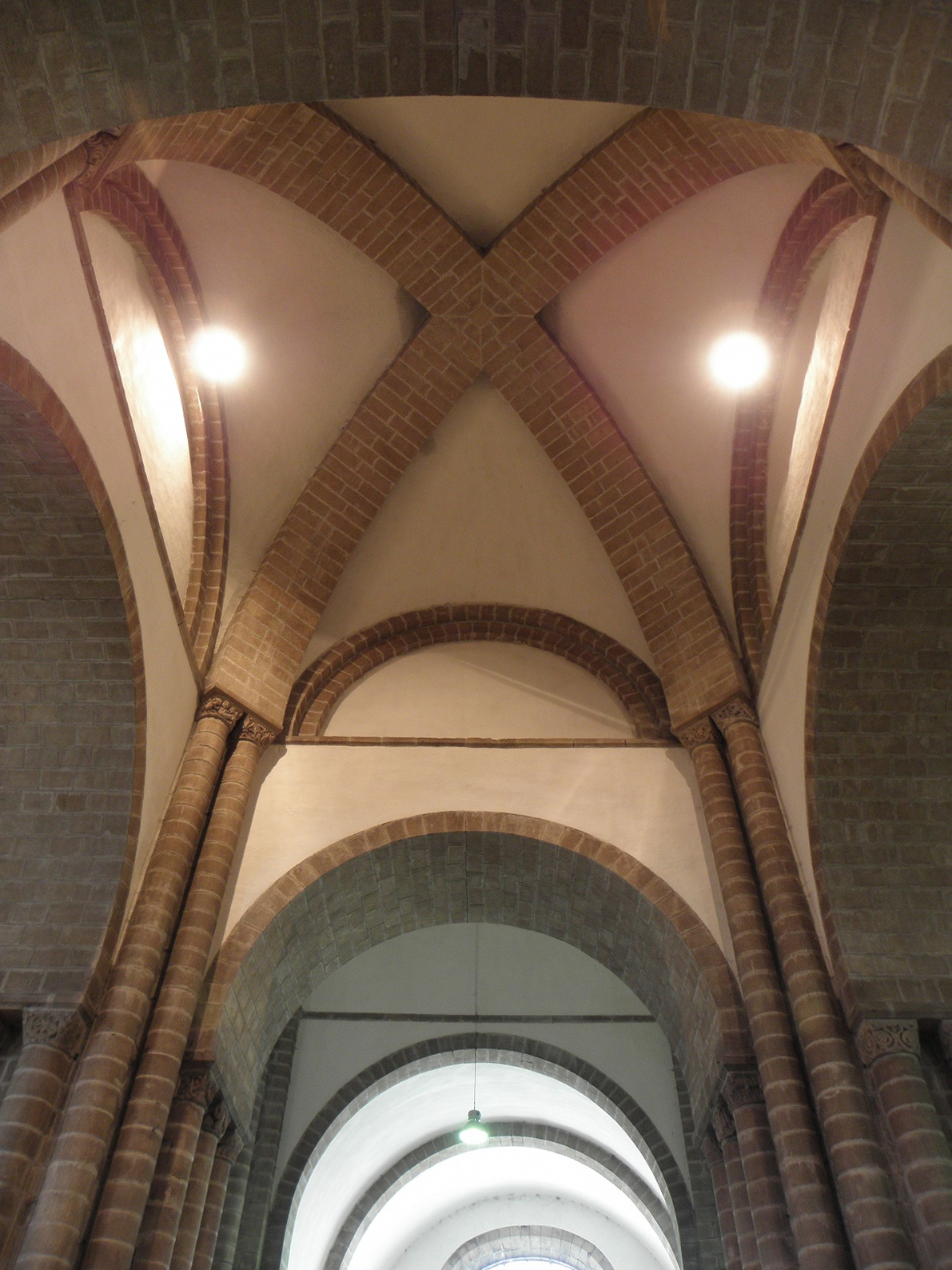
Groin vault with ribs at Sainte-Croix Abbey, Quimperlé, Brittany (1083)

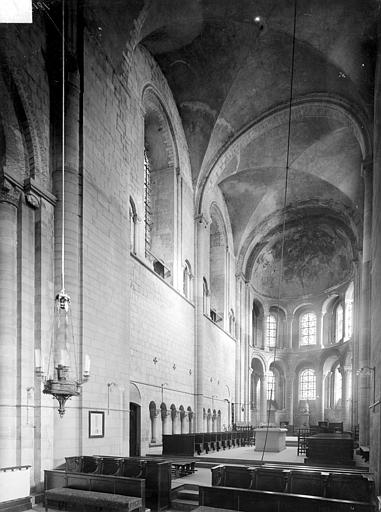
Groin vaults of the choir of the Abbey of Sainte-Trinité, Caen (1080s)

False ribs painted to conceal uneven groins at Norwich Cathedral.

=== The later Romanesque ===
The Kingdom of England and the Duchy of Normandy became centres of architectural innovation in the late 11th century. William the Conqueror constructed the domes of the Abbey of Saint-Étienne, Caen with a kind of rib vault in its central lantern. Construction of the new church at Durham Cathedral began in 1093 under the direction of its Norman bishop, William de St-Calais. It was originally intended to build the cathedral entirely with rounded-arch groin vaults, but as work continued on the nave the Norman builders experimented with pointed arches, which directed the weight outward and downwards. The space between the ribs was filled with severies made of small pieces of stone. At its corners the weight was supported by colonettes which transferred it downwards to alternating columns and piers below rather than to the walls. Since the panels are relatively thin, these rib vaults are lighter than the earlier barrel and groin vaults so the walls could be higher and could have larger windows.

The work began at the east end of Durham Cathedral; the vaults over the aisles were complete in 1096, and over the choir by 1107. The nave vaults, with pointed arches, were begun in about 1130. Thanks to the pointed arches, the upper level of the clerestory seemed to merge into the roof in a unified whole. The Durham experiment, however, quickly ran into problems. The vault panels in the chancel were made of plastered rubble, and began to crack, and had to be replaced in 1235. In the meantime, experimentation in pointed rib vaults moved to France, where thinner and lighter panels were made of small cut pieces of stone, rather than rubble.

The Romanesque Lessay Abbey in Normandy added rib vaults in the choir in about 1098. which covered portions of the choir and nave. It was destroyed in World War II but rebuilt. The dome of the Romanesque Church of the Holy Sepulchre, Cambridge in England, begun in 1130, has ribs in the dome, though they were largely decorative. The Romanesque Cefalù Cathedral in the Norman Kingdom of Sicily, begun in 1131, has a Gothic rib vault.

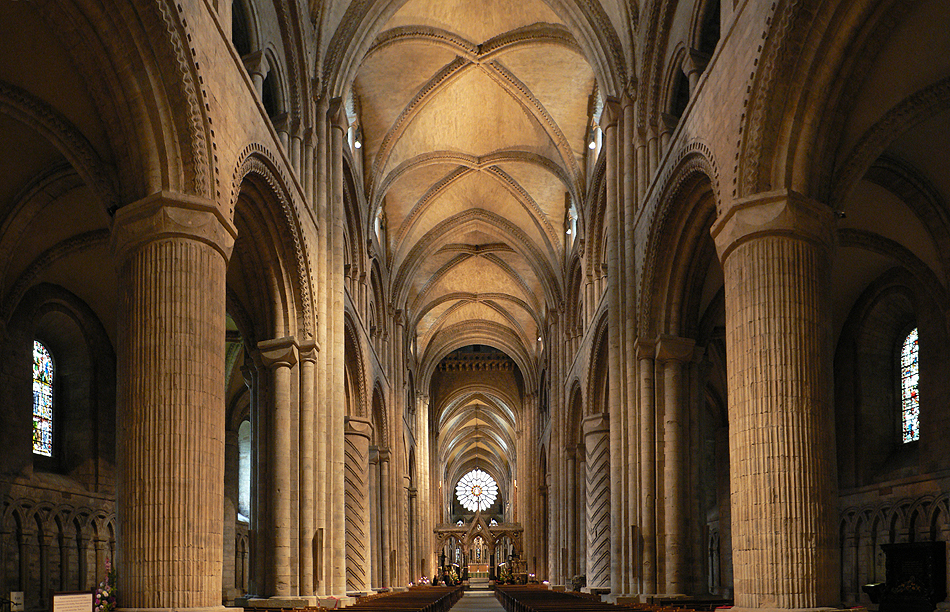
Nave of Durham Cathedral, (1093–1135)

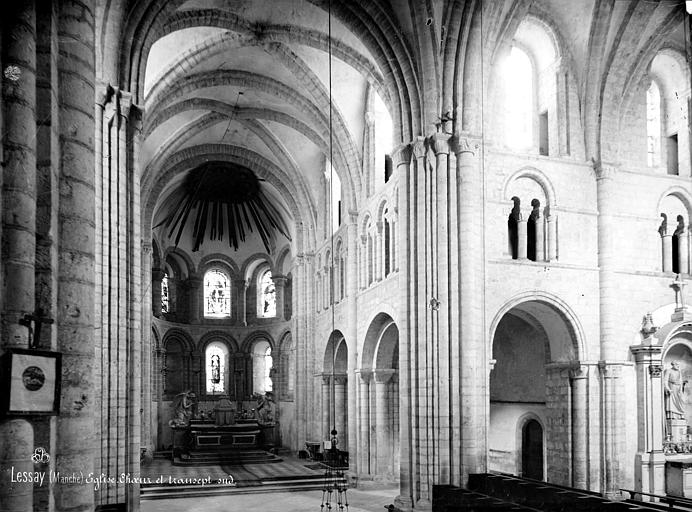
Early rib vault in east end of Lessay Abbey, Normandy (about 1098) (photo from before World War II)

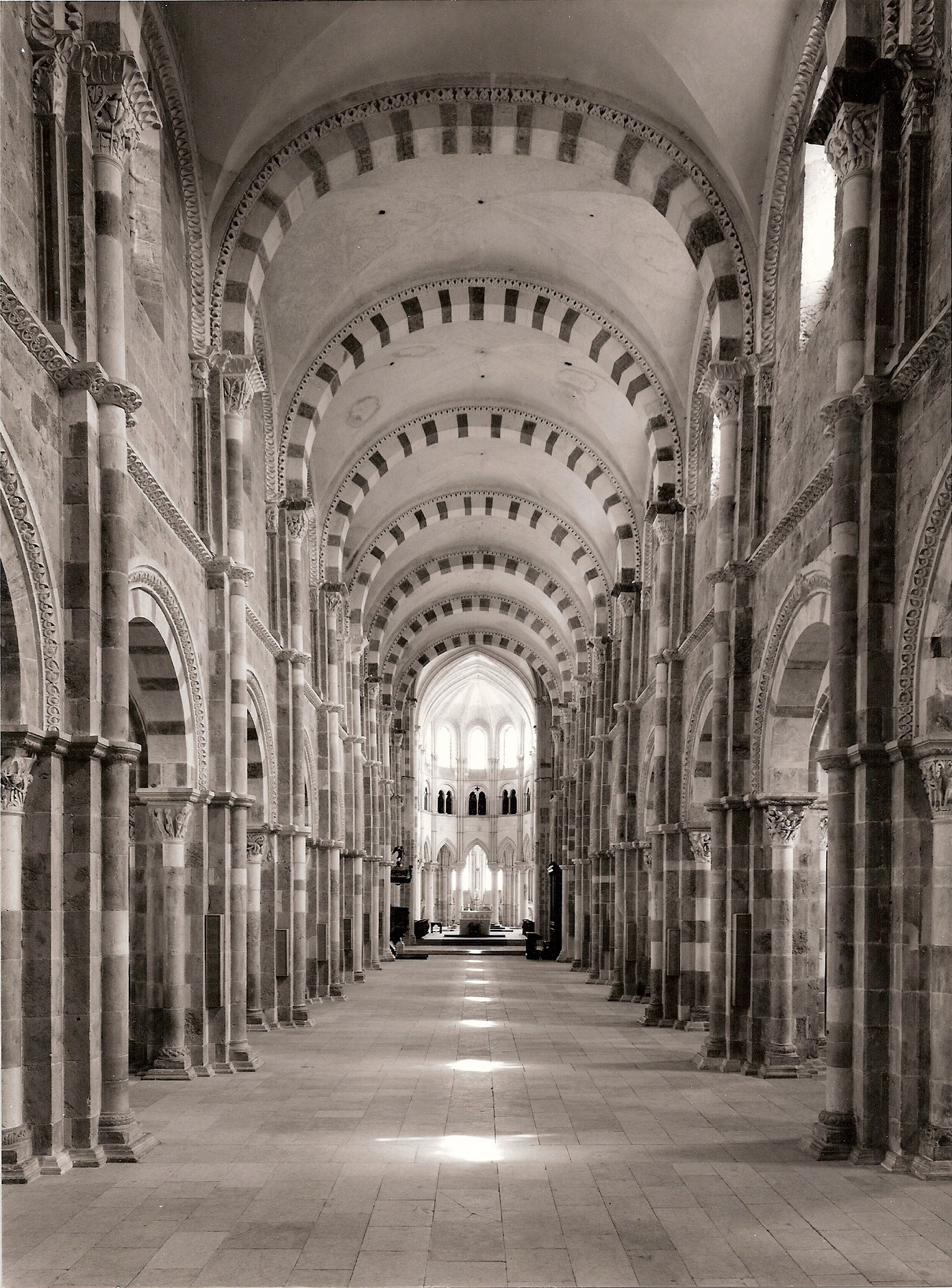
Nave of Vézelay Abbey, (1104–1132) with Romanesque groin vaults in the nave (foreground) and Gothic rib vaults in the choir (background)

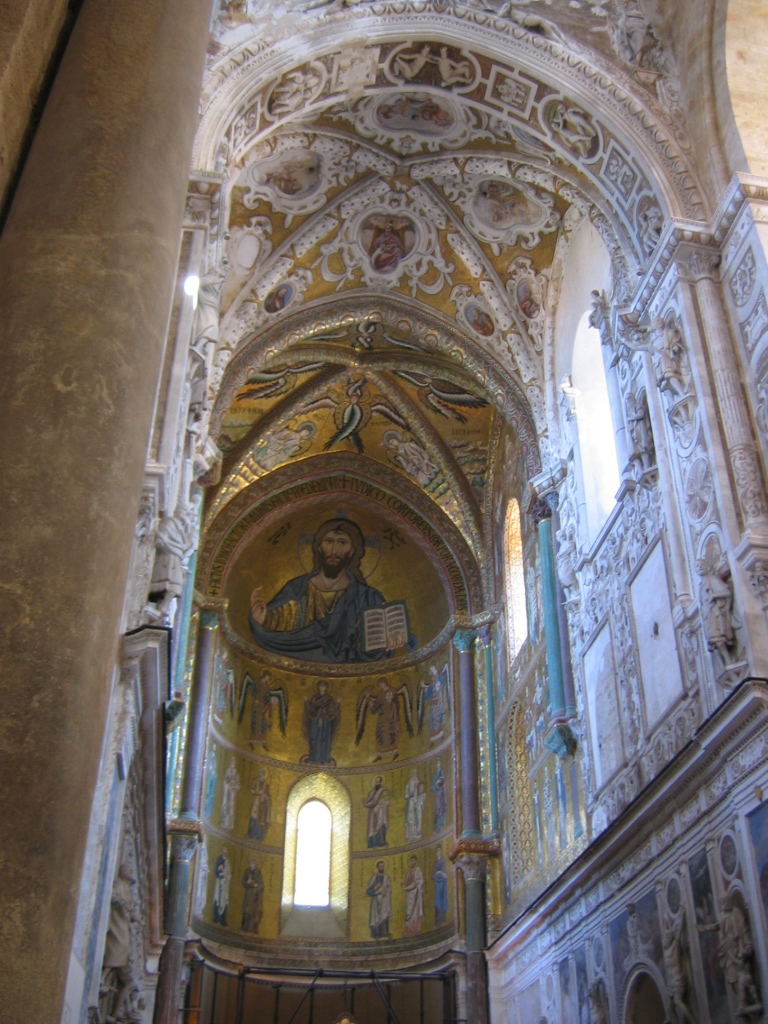
Norman-Gothic vaults in choir of Cefalù Cathedral (1131–1240)

Other variations of rib vaults, usually with rounded arches, appeared in Lombardy in the Basilica of Sant'Ambrogio, Milan, at the end of the 11th century, and in Southwest France at Moissac Abbey (11th-12th century). These were usually groin vaults, composed by joining two barrel vaults at right angles. Other types of vaults were decorative, such as the star vaults used to decorate the lantern tower on the roof of Caen Cathedral and Laon Cathedral, or the ribs on the interior of the dome of the Round Church in Cambridge (1130).

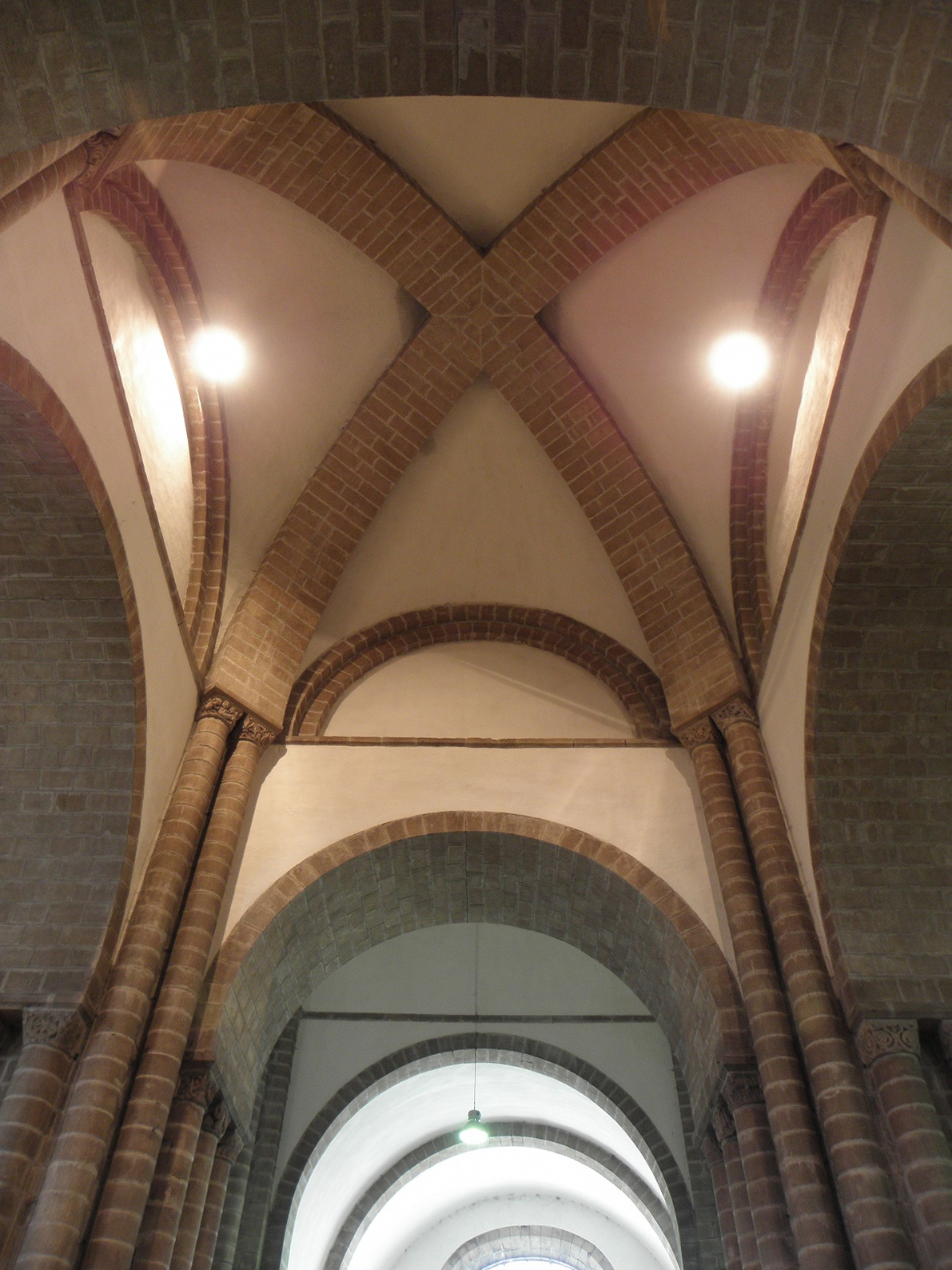
Sainte-Croix Abbey church of Quimperlé (1083)

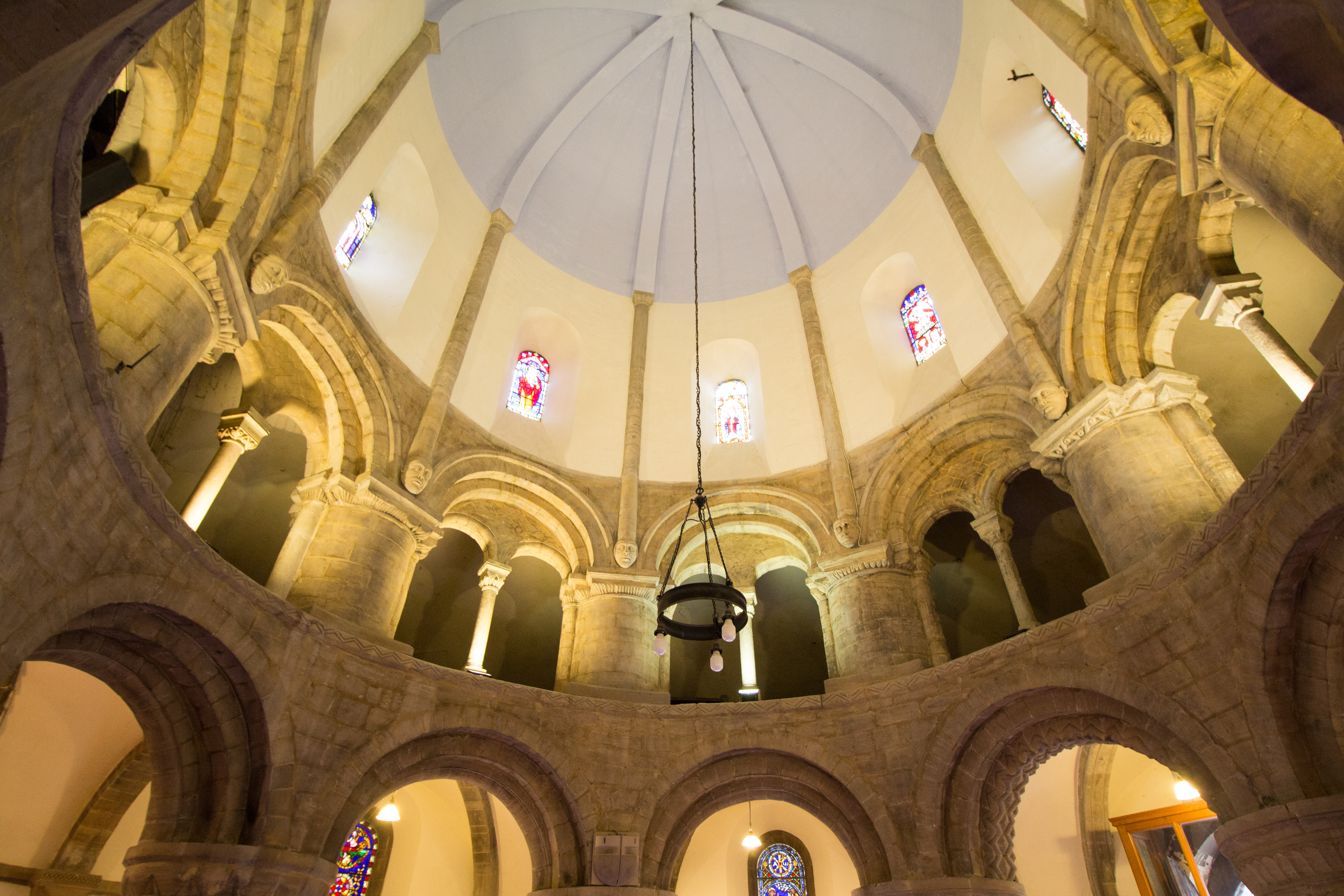
Church of the Holy Sepulchre, Cambridge (c. 1130)

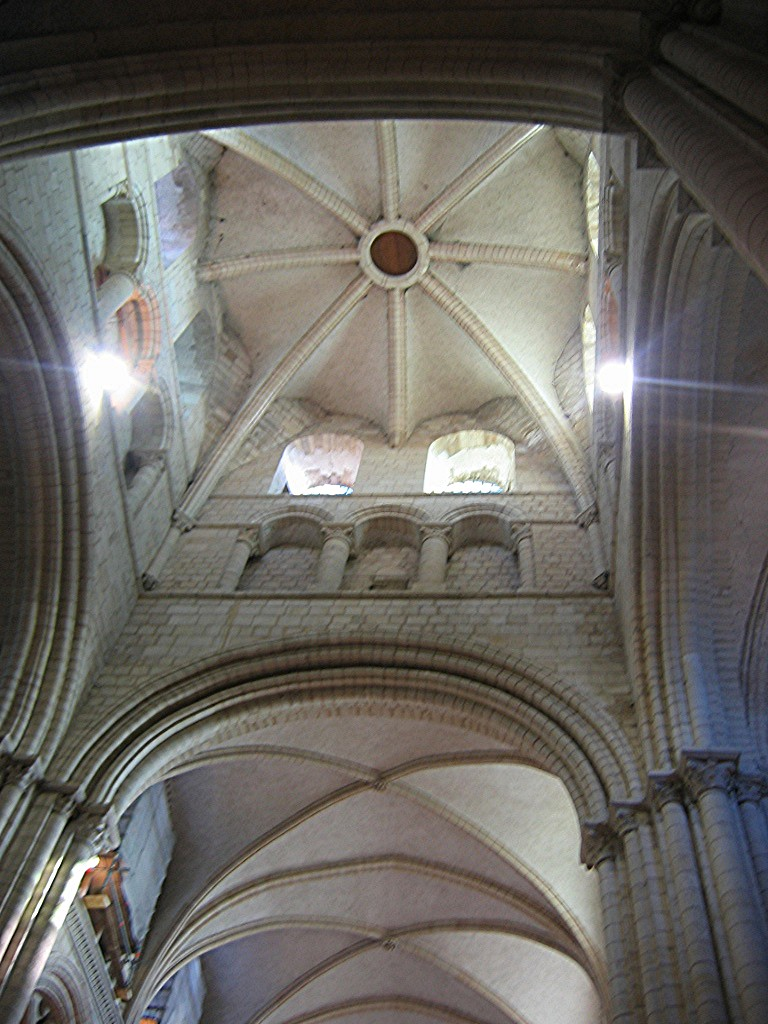
Star vault, Caen Cathedral (1065–1166)

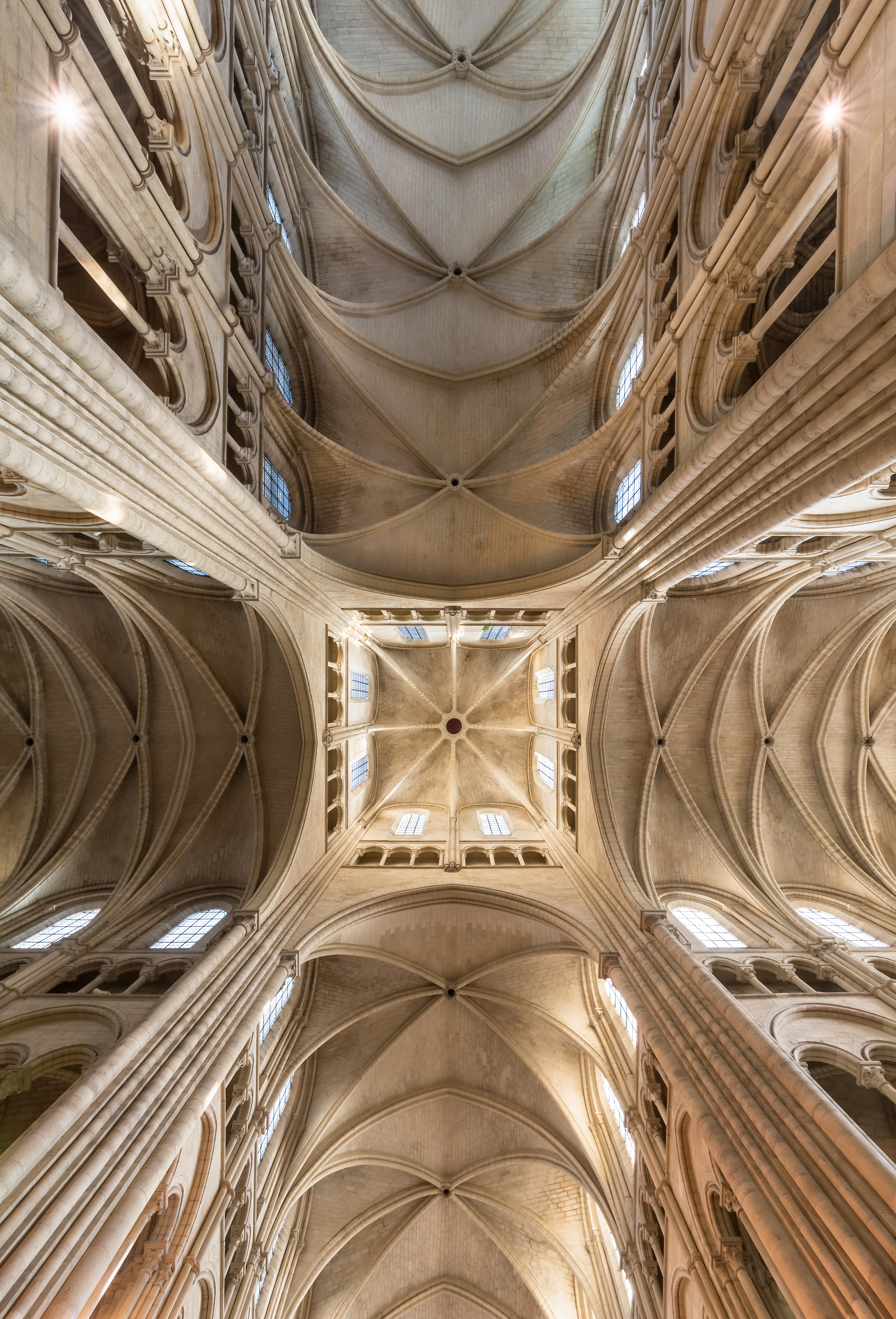
Lantern vault, Laon Cathedral (1150s–1230)

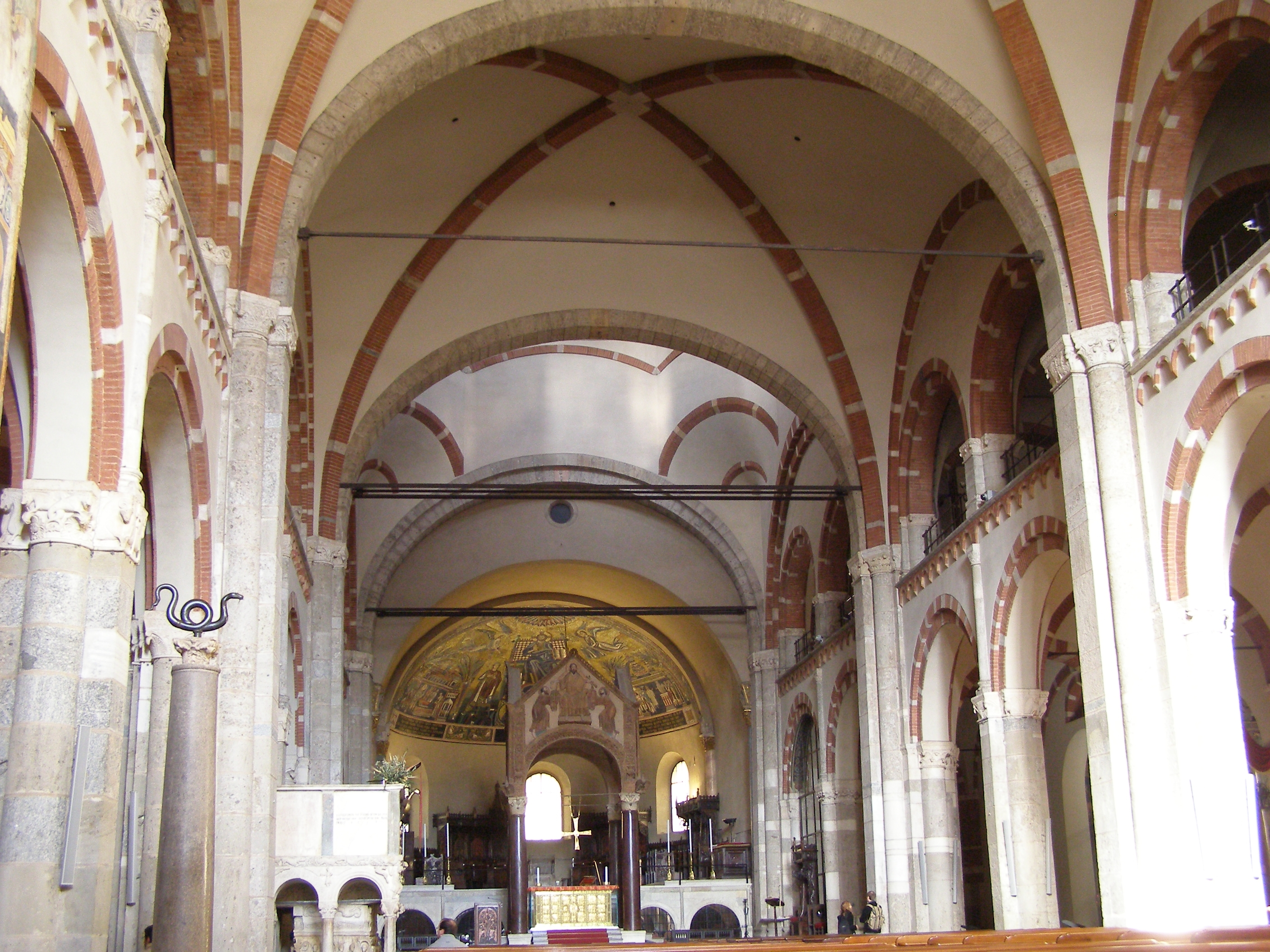
Basilica of Sant'Ambrogio (12th century)

=== Sexpartite vaulting ===
In sexpartite vaulting, each bay was divided by thin stone ribs into six compartments. The intermediate ribs diagonally crossing the vault formed a pointed arch, and there was an additional intermediate pointed arch, which crossed from side to side. Since the ribs carried the weight, the panels of the vaults were made of small pieces of stone, and were much lighter than traditional barrel vaults. The ribs transmitted the weight outwards and downwards through slender columns to the piers on the lower level. The weight was not distributed equally; the additional weight of the diagonal traverse arches was supported by massive piers, while the intermediate crossing arch was supported by simple columns. Since the weight of the vaults was carried by the columns and piers, not the walls, the walls could be thinner and higher, and they could be filled with larger stained glass windows.

Early examples of sexpartite rib vaults are found at the Abbaye-aux-Hommes (begun 1066) and Abbaye-aux-Dames at Caen. It then appeared in Noyon Cathedral (begun 1131); the square Gothic porch of the Romanesque church of Vézelay Abbey in France (1132); Sens Cathedral (begun 1135); the choir of the Abbey of Saint-Denis (begun 1140); Laon Cathedral (begun 1150); Notre-Dame de Paris (begun 1163), and at Bourges Cathedral (begun 1195). Ribbed vaults were built by William the Englishman at Canterbury Cathedral and in St Faith's Chapel in Westminster Abbey (1180).

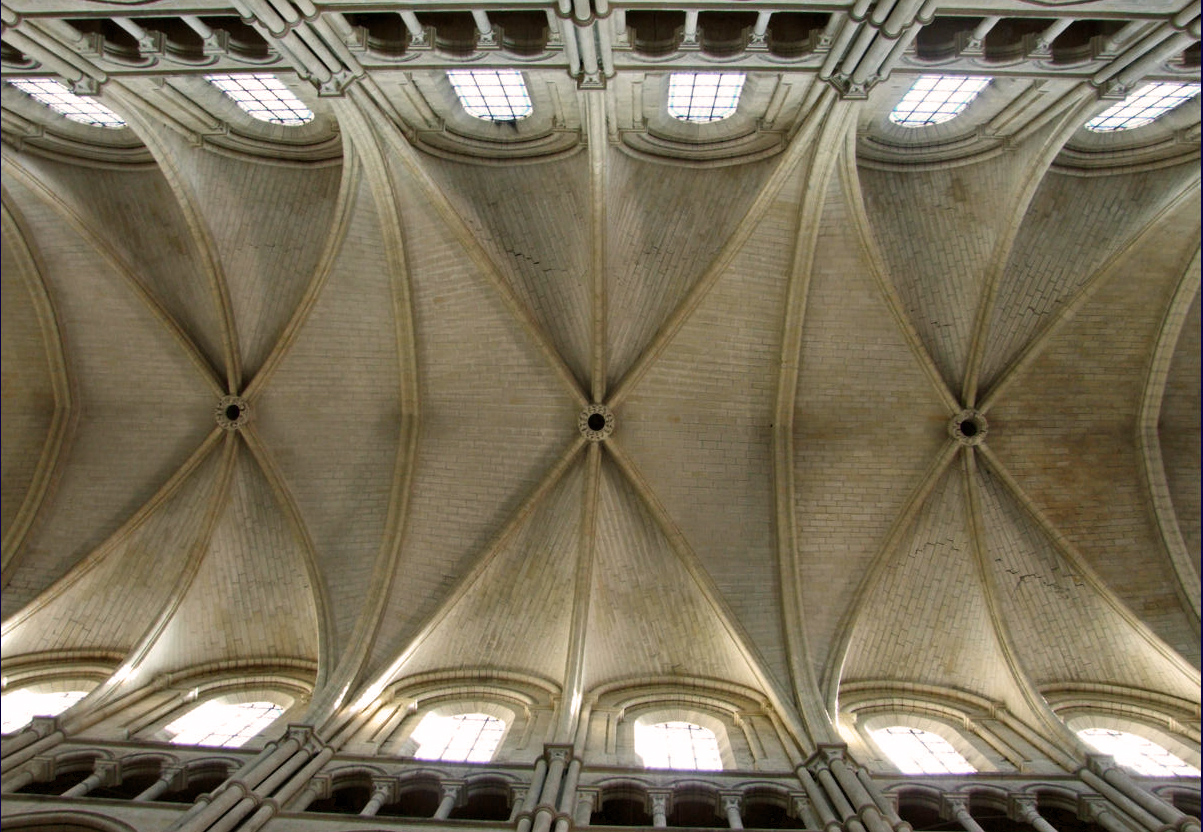
Sexpartite rib vaults in Laon Cathedral (1150–1235)

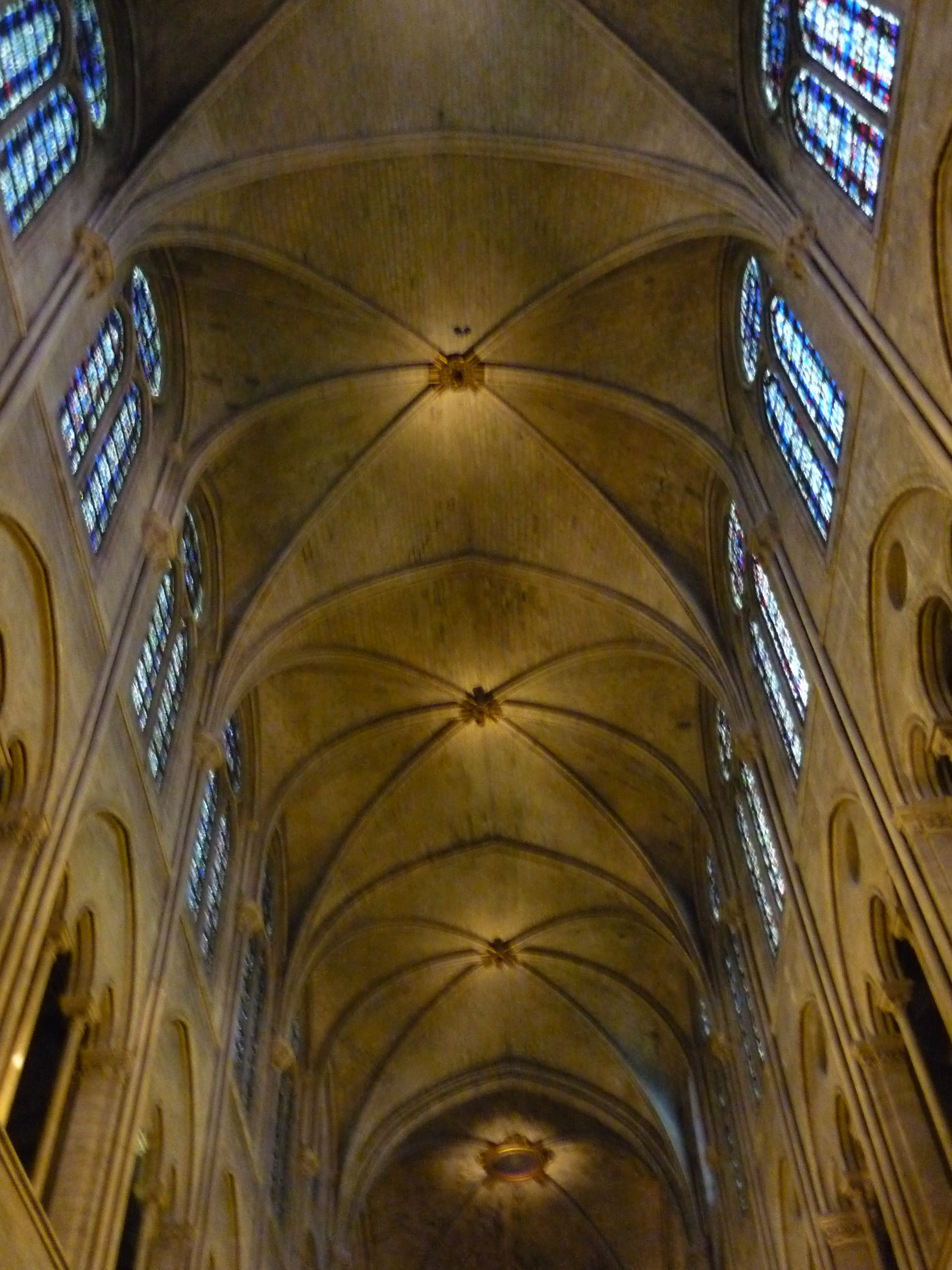
Six-part rib vaults in the nave of Notre-Dame de Paris (1163–1345)

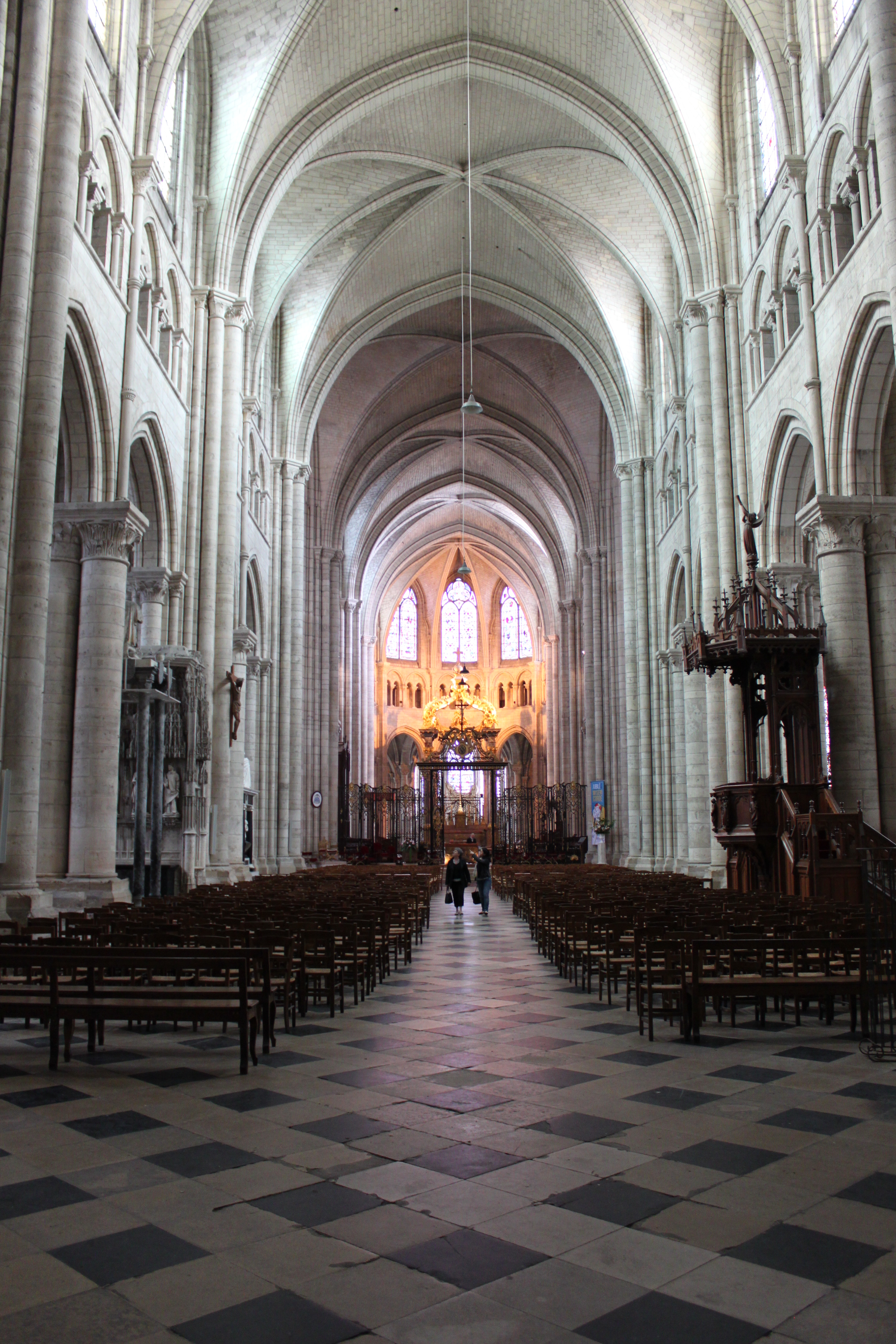
Sexpartite rib vaults in Sens Cathedral (1135–1164)

=== Octopartite vaulting ===
A development of the sexpartite design, eight-part rib vaults were likewise used to vault over straight/rectangular bays in some churches, though surviving examples are rare. Octopartite vaults of this kind can be found in the choirs of the churches of Saint-Qiriace in Provins and Notre-Dame-de-l'Assomption in Voulton, in the Île-de-France.

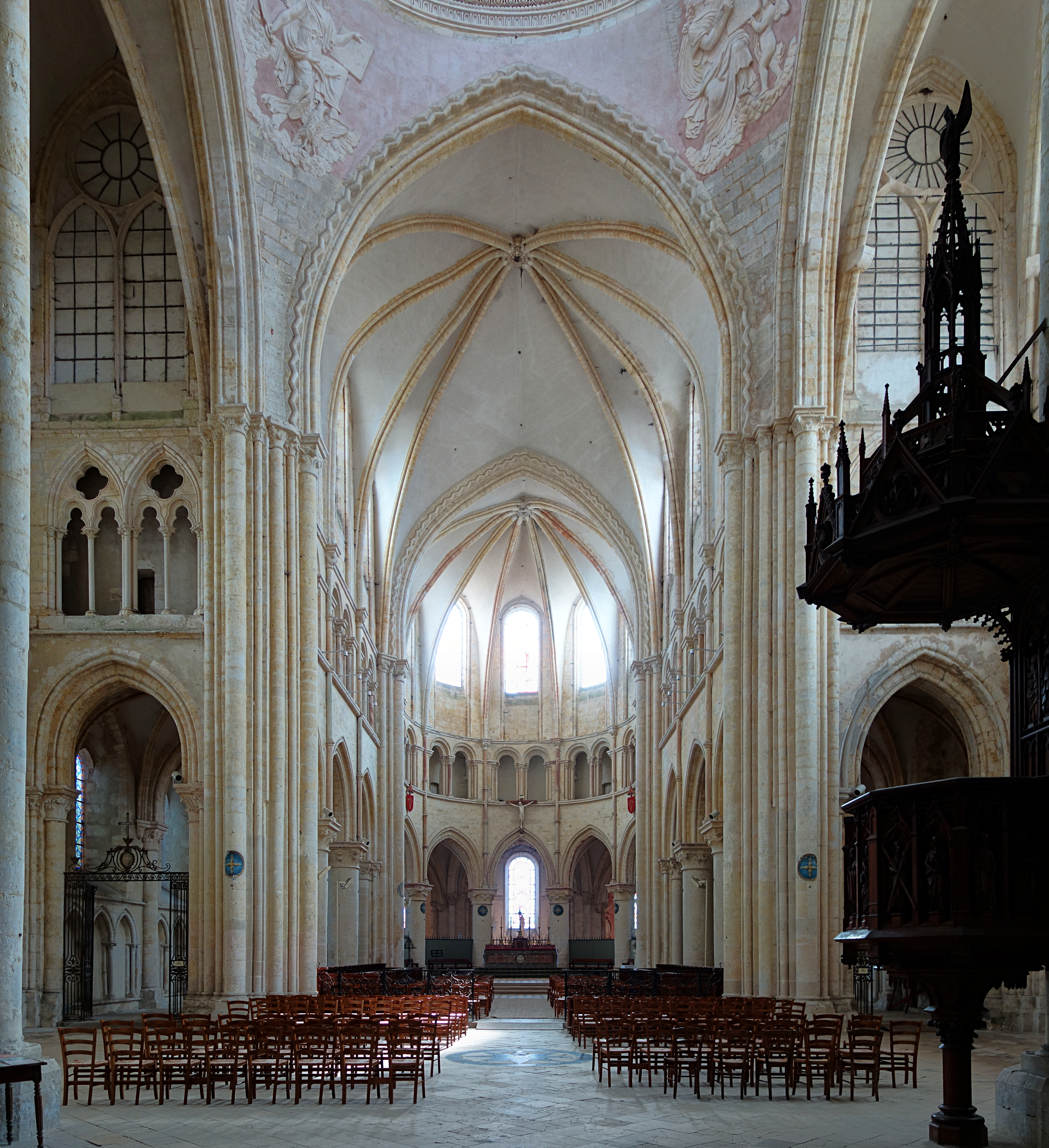
Octopartite vault over the straight choir bays of Saint-Quiriace, Provins (1238)

=== Quadripartite vaulting ===
A new variation of rib vault appeared during the High Gothic period; the four-part rib vault, which was used in Chartres Cathedral, Amiens Cathedral and Reims Cathedral. The ribs of this vault distributed the weight more equally to the four supporting piers below, and established a closer connection between the nave and the lower portions of the church walls, and between the arcades below and the windows above. This allowed for greater height and thinner walls, and contributed to the strong impression of verticality given by the newer Cathedrals. The 11th century Durham Cathedral (1093–1135), with the earlier six-part rib vaults, is 73 feet (22 meters) high. The 12th-century nave of Notre-Dame de Paris, also with six-part rib vaults, is 115 feet, or 35 meters high. The later Amiens Cathedral (built 1220–1266), with the new four-part rib vaults, has a nave that is 138.8 feet (42.3 meters) high. The tallest nave of all the Gothic Cathedrals is that of Beauvais Cathedral, though only a single bay was completed. It is 47.5 m (156 ft) in height, slightly taller than the nave of St Peter's Basilica in Rome.

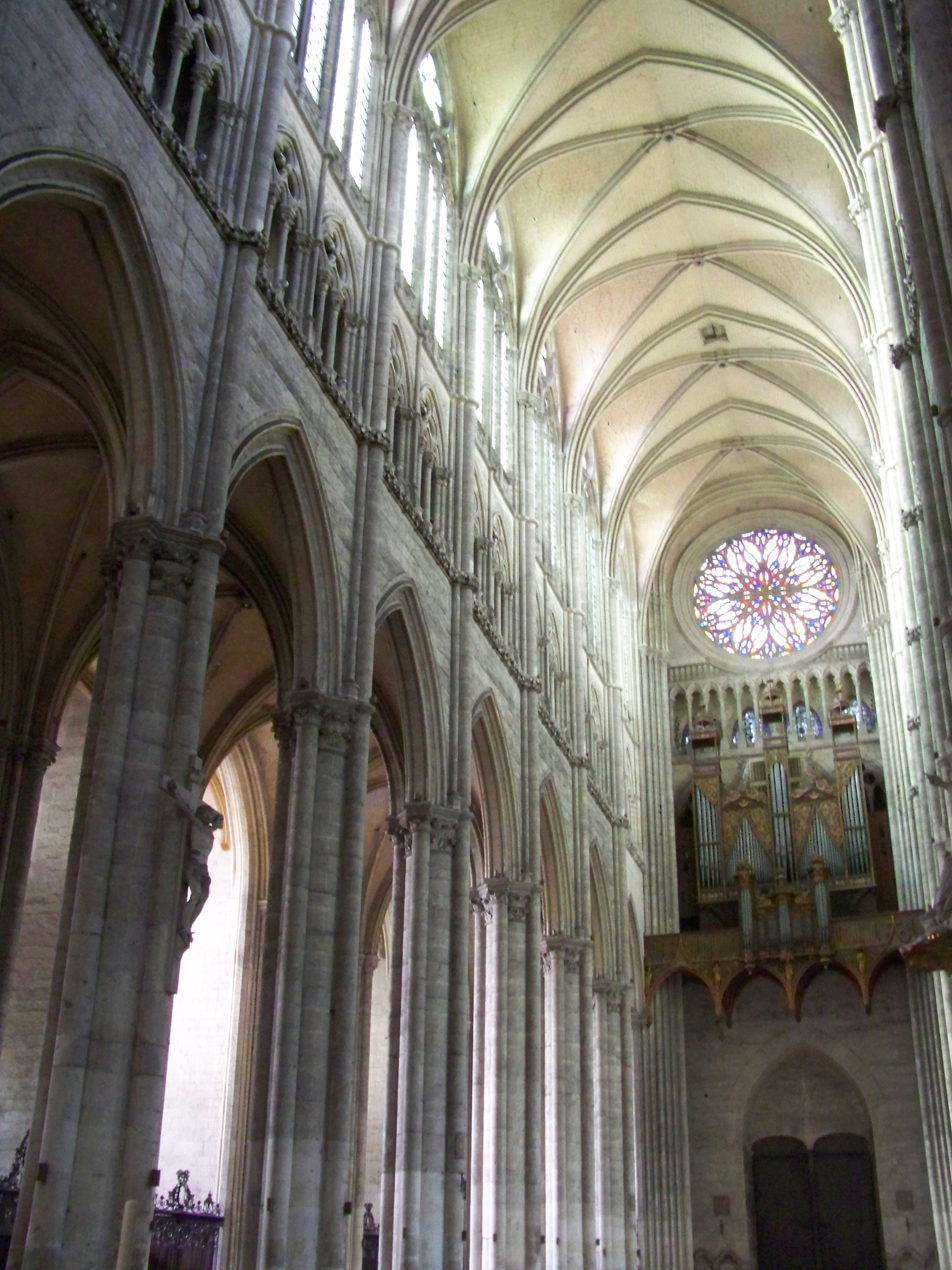
Quadripartite vaults at Amiens Cathedral (1220–1270)

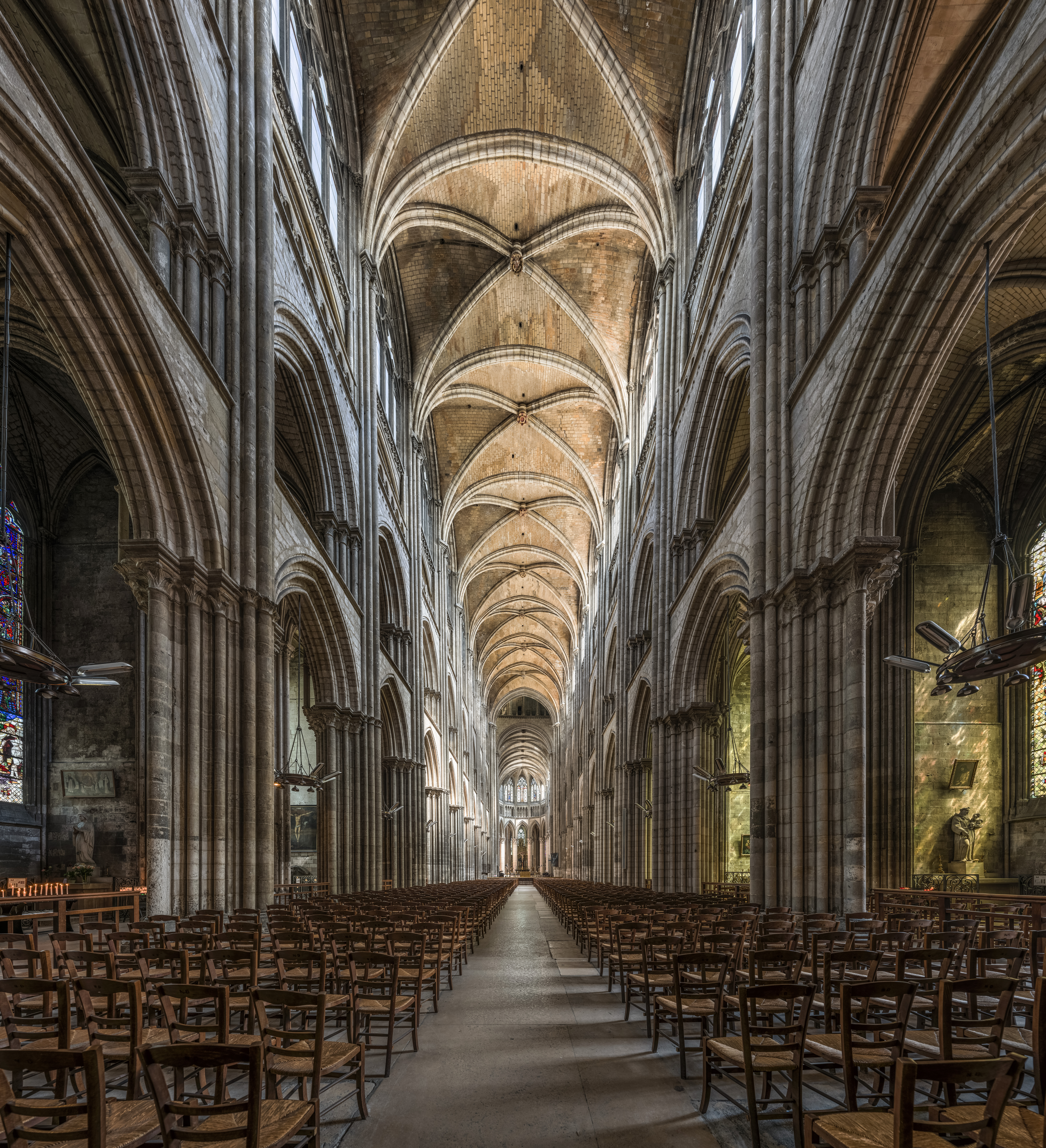
Four-part rib vaults at Rouen Cathedral (13th c.)

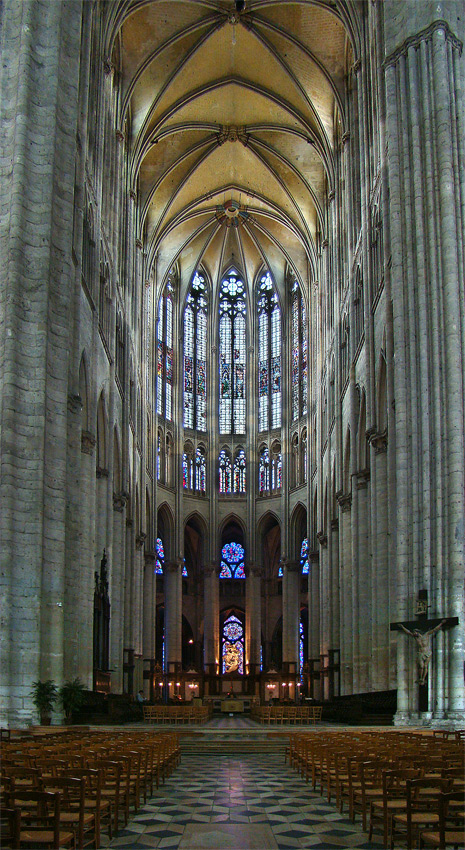
The choir of Beauvais Cathedral (1225–1272)

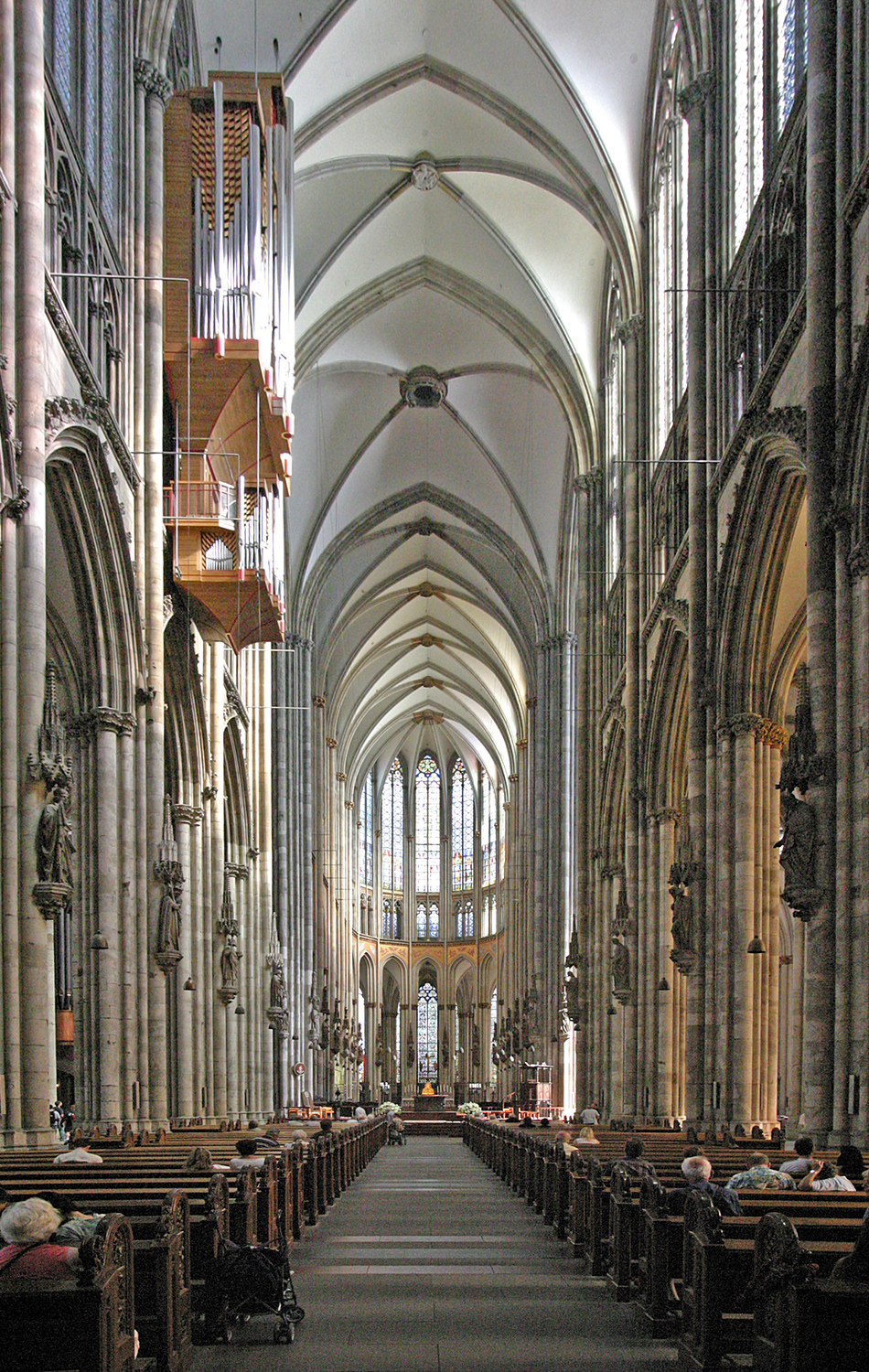
Nave of Cologne Cathedral (1248–1322)

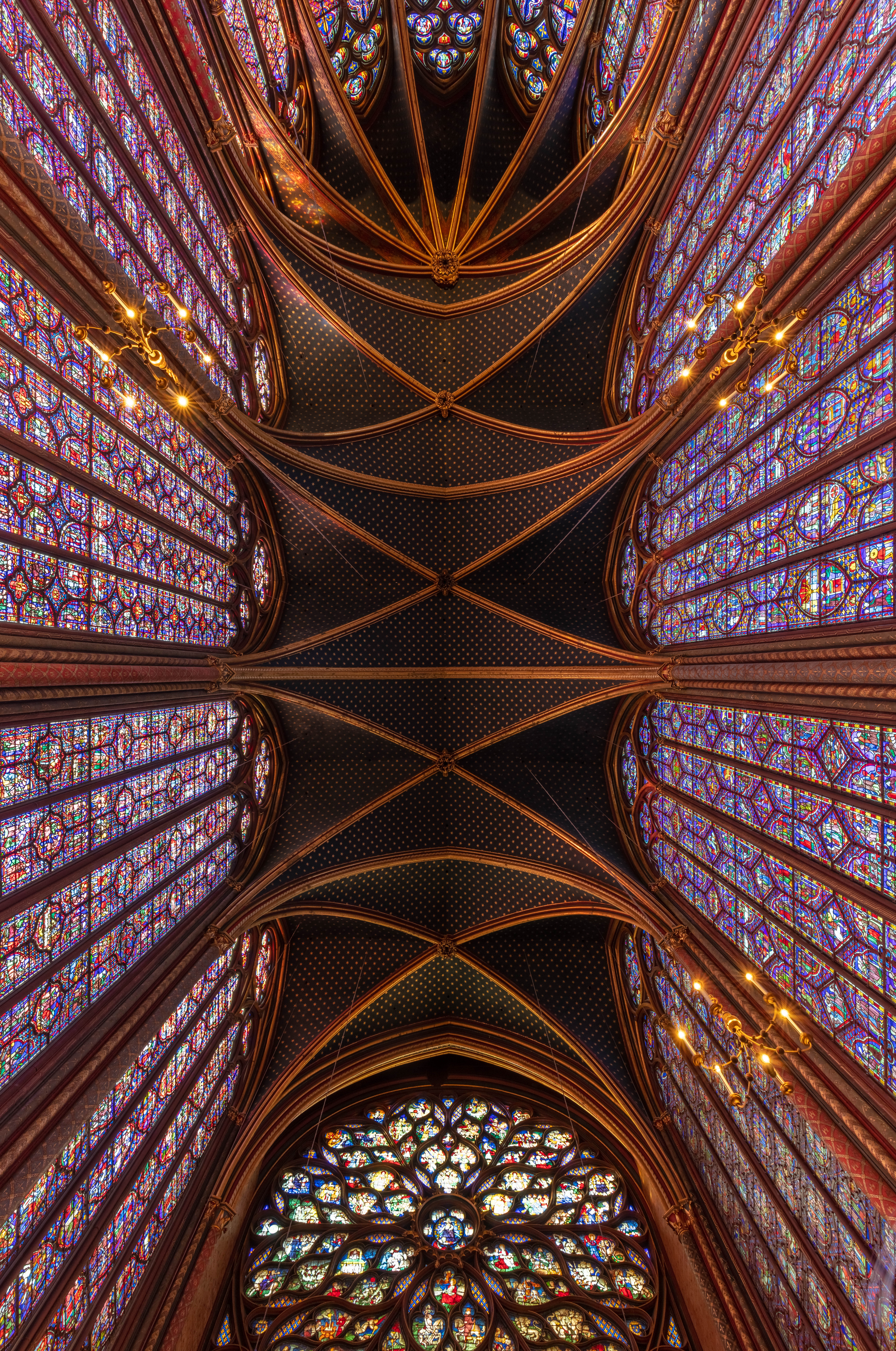
Vaults of the Sainte-Chapelle, Paris (1242–1248)

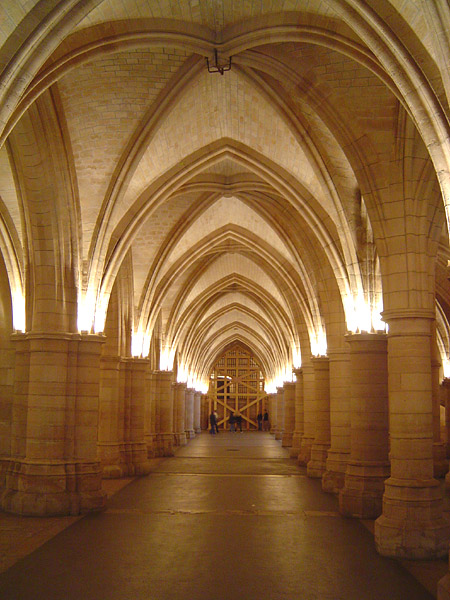
Hall of the Guards in the Conciergerie, Paris (13th c.)

=== Complex rib vaults ===
Beginning in England with the Decorated Gothic style of the late 13th century, a variety of complex vaults emerged which incorporated purely decorative ribs in addition to structural ones. Vaults would continue to increase in complexity in the Perpendicular period, and similarly extravagant rib vaulting would appear in other late Gothic styles such as the Flamboyant in France and Sondergotik in Central Europe.

Tierceron vaults make use of tertiary ribs (tiercerons) in addition to the main structural ribs of the regular quadripartite vault. This can be seen in the Decorated Gothic nave of Exeter Cathedral, begun in 1310; the massive vault has a profusion of tierceron ribs like palm leaves, with as many as eleven tiercerons curving upward from a single springer. An octagonal tierceron vault completed in 1306 roofs the chapter house of Wells Cathedral, where 32 ribs spring from a single central pillar. At Ely Cathedral (1322–1342), tiercerons decorate the (wooden) vault of the octagonal lantern over the crossing.

Lierne vaults also feature prominently in the Decorated and Perpendicular Gothic architecture of England. Liernes are very short decorative ribs that connect one rib to another. Most lierne vaults incorporate both liernes and tiercerons, resulting in intricate designs resembling stars, webs, nets, or other patterns. The Perpendicular Gothic choir of Gloucester Cathedral features an extremely complex net-like vault covered completely in liernes, while the Lady Chapel of Ely Cathedral has a vault of liernes concentrated mainly around the centreline of the ceiling.

The Perpendicular Gothic fan vault is a unique type of vault particular to England. It is not constructed of separate ribs and webbing, as the whole vault is made of an integrated stone shell. The ribs are all of the same curve and spaced equally, in a manner resembling a fan. Thus, unlike gothic vaults derived from pointed arches, the fan vault is composed of semicircular conoids. The earliest example of fan vaulting is in the cloisters of Gloucester Cathedral. The King's College Chapel, Cambridge, has the world's largest fan-vaulted ceiling.

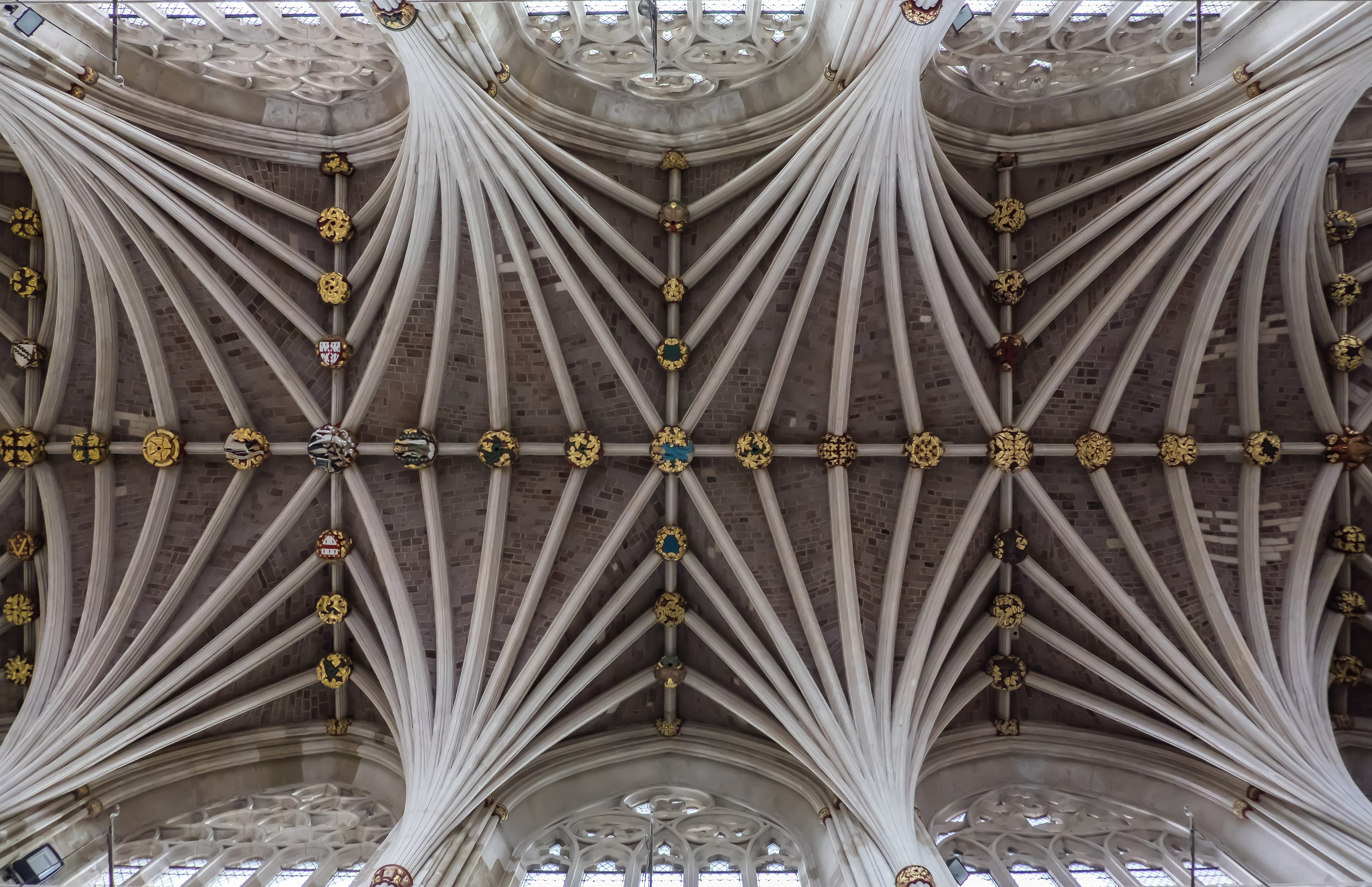
Tierceron vault in the nave of Exeter Cathedral

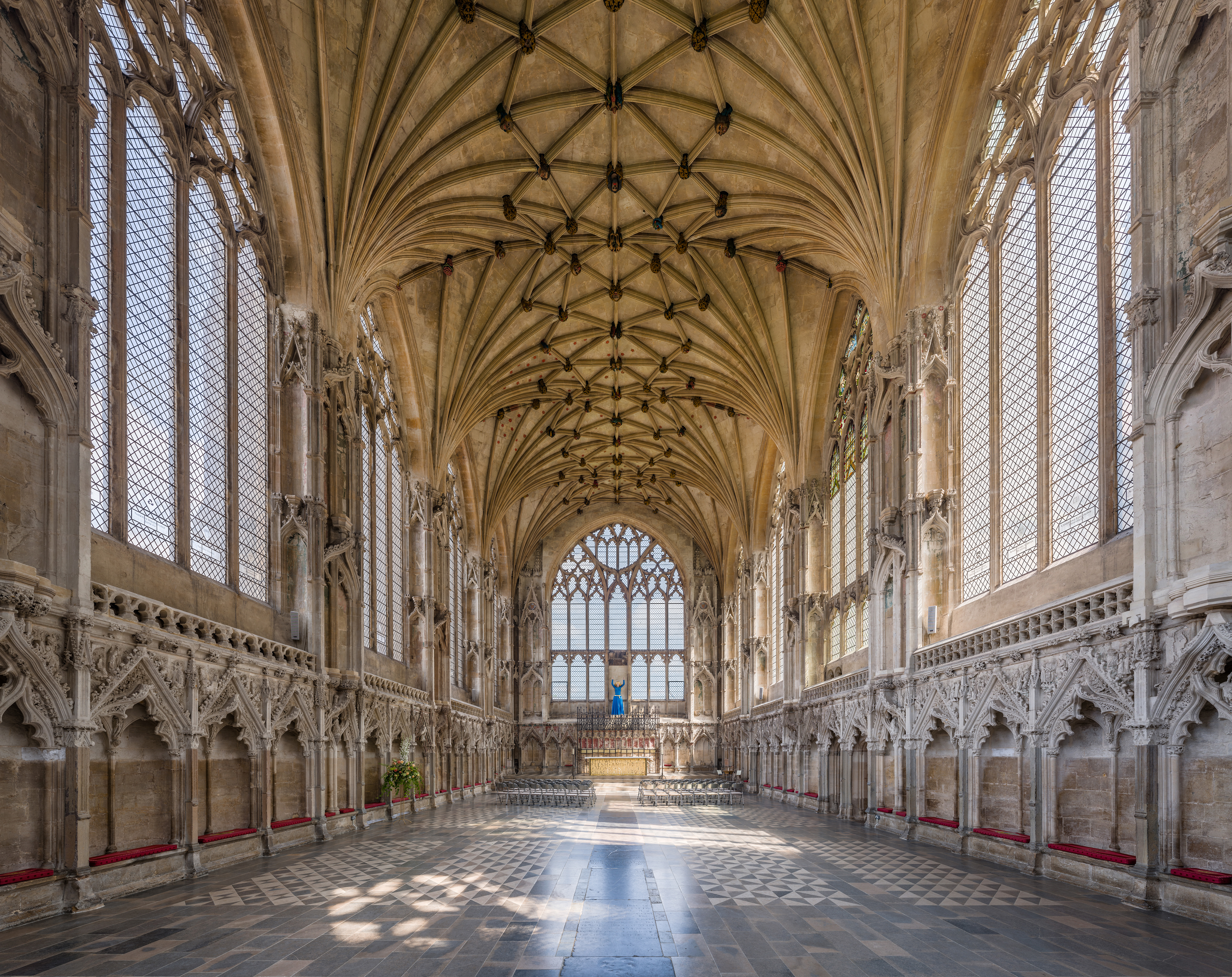
Lierne vault in the Lady Chapel of Ely Cathedral (begun 1321)

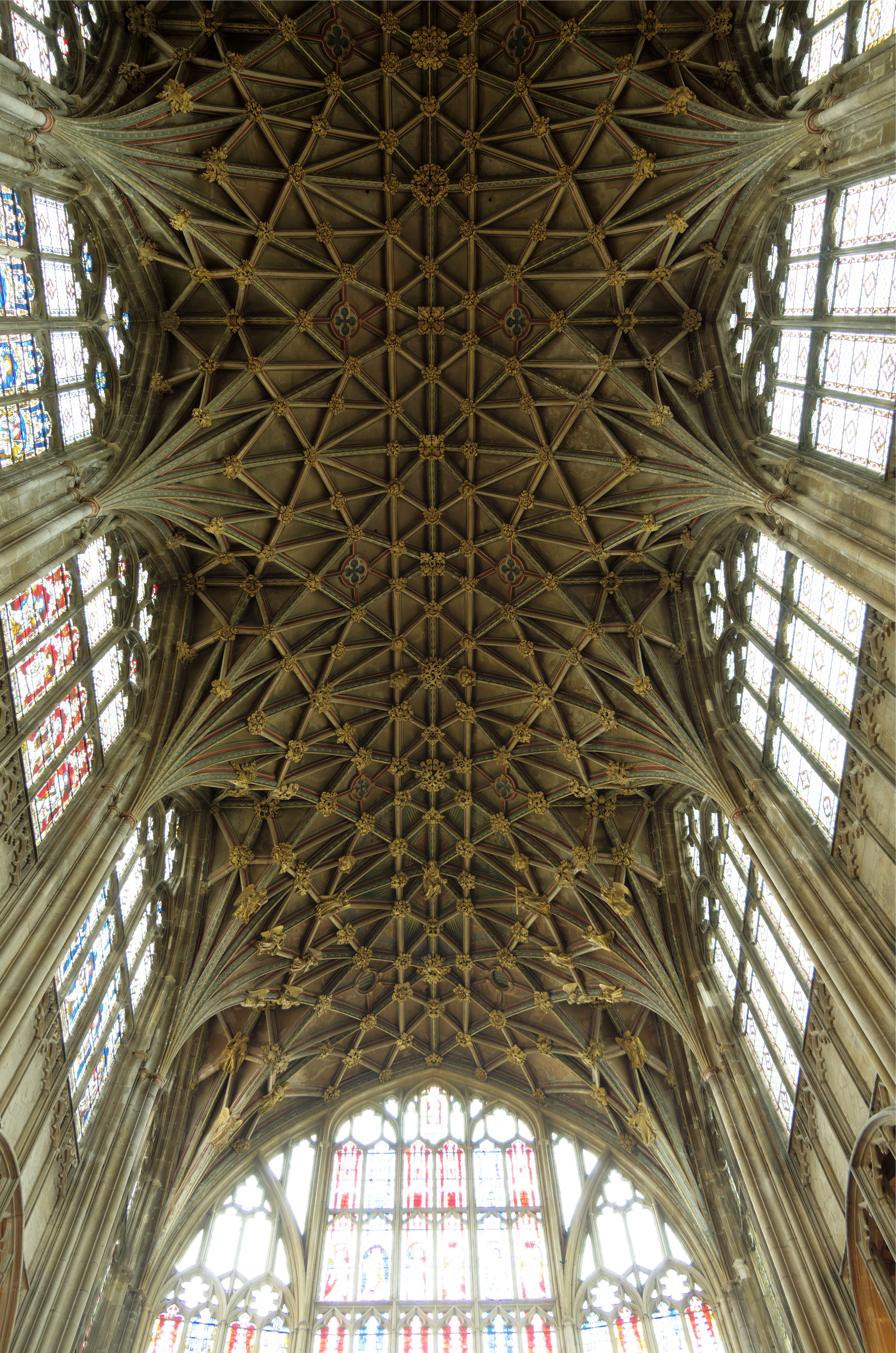
Lierne vault in the choir of Gloucester Cathedral (1331)

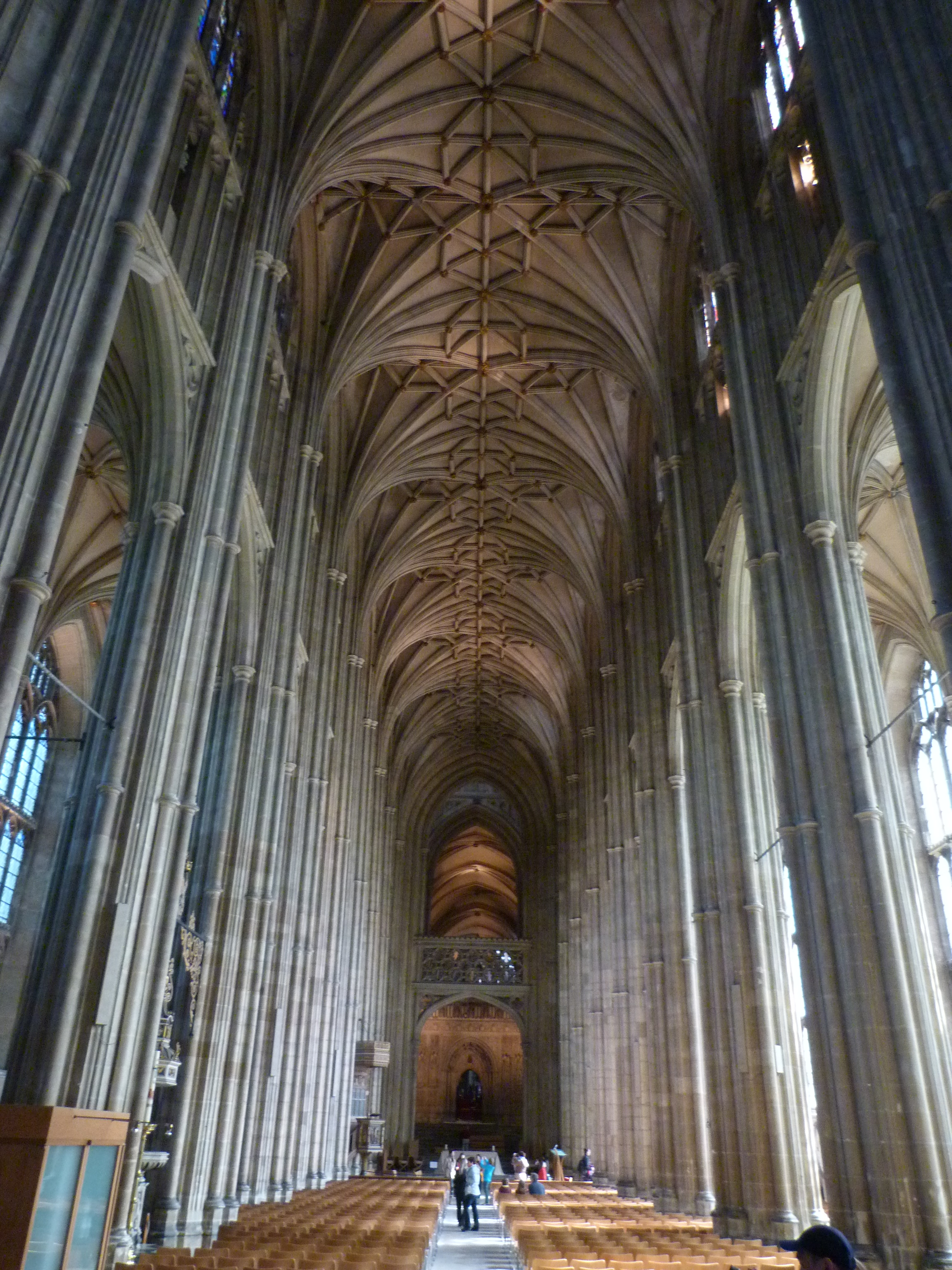
Lierne vault in the nave of Canterbury Cathedral (late 14th century)

Late Gothic star vault of the Monastery of Batalha, Portugal (1386)

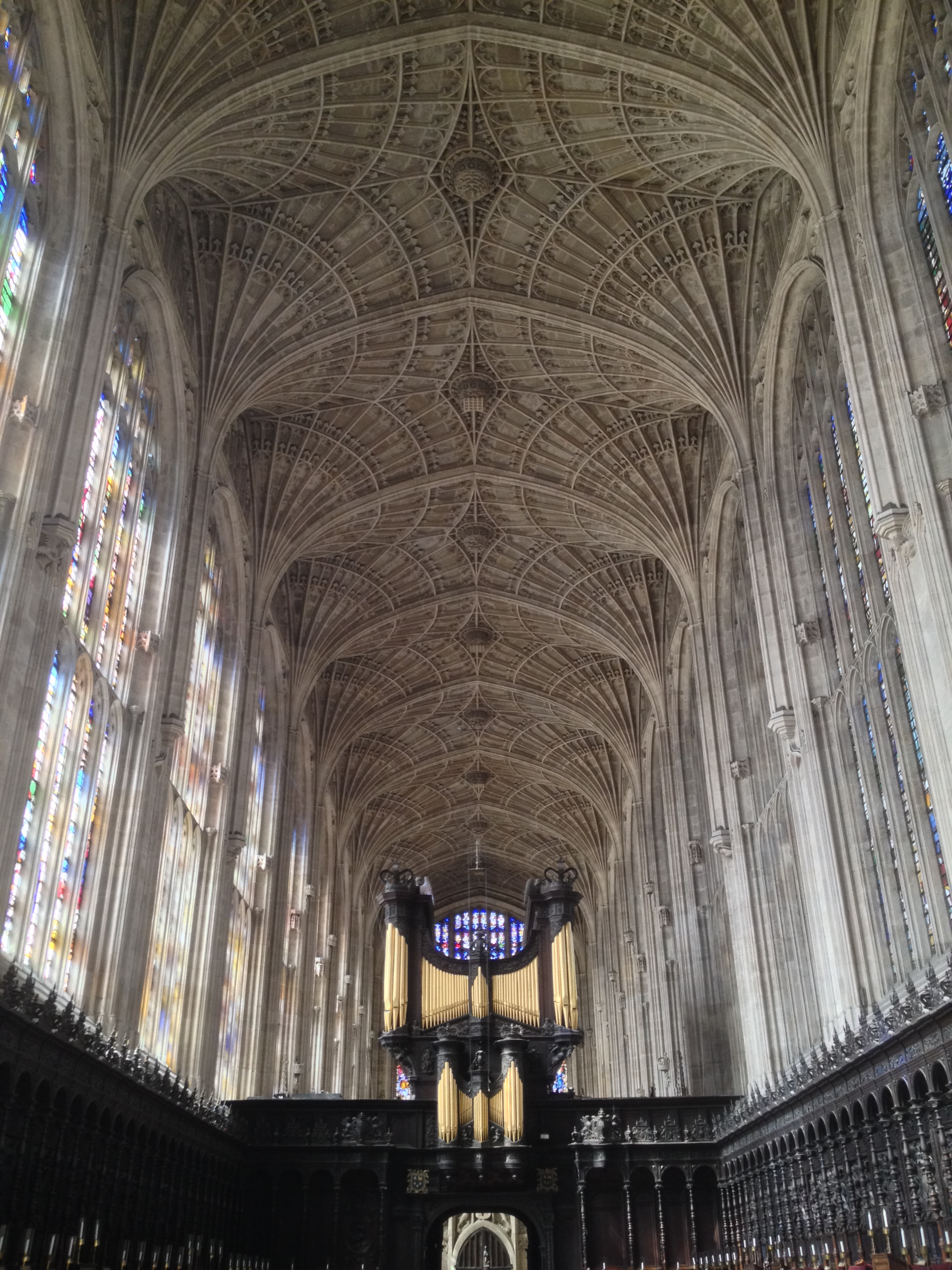
Fan vault in King's College Chapel (vaulted 1512-15)

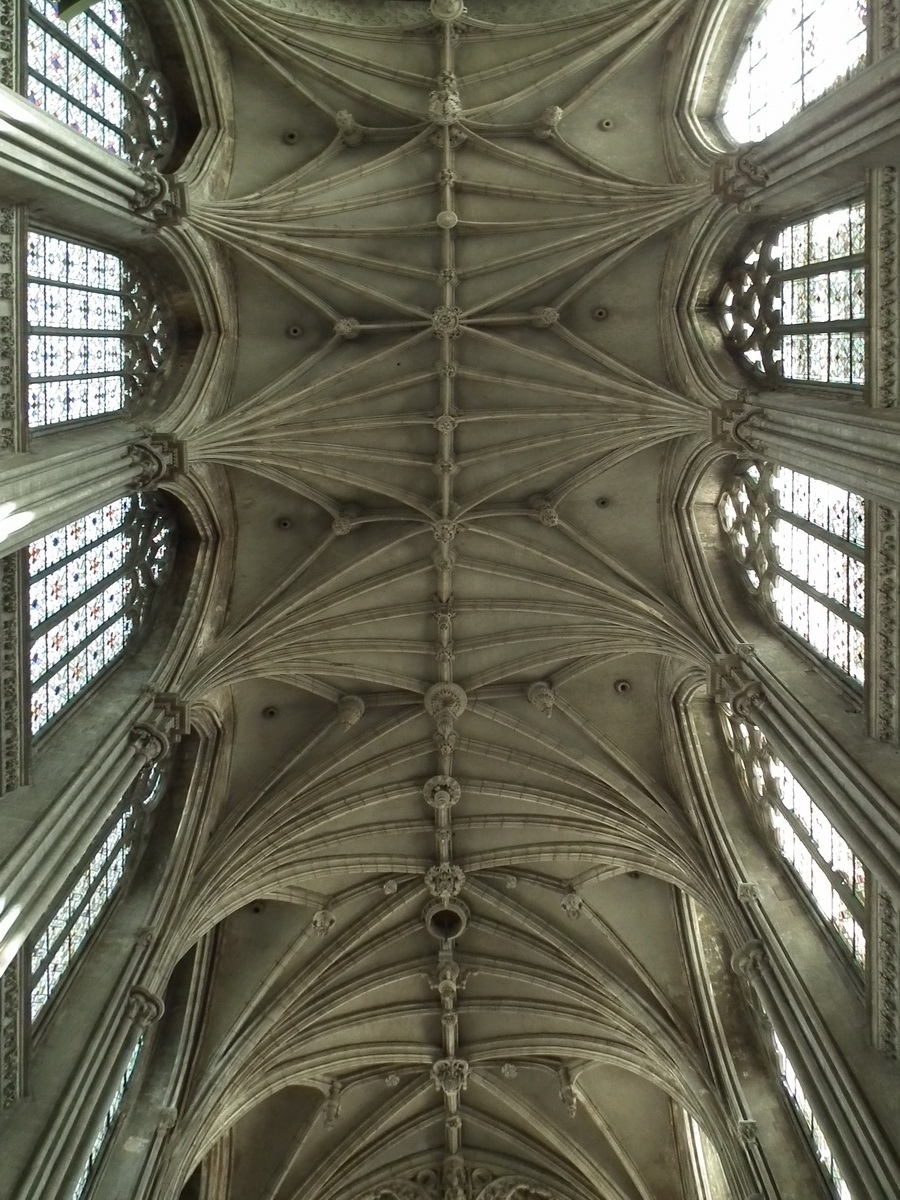
Tierceron vault in the Church of Saint-Pierre, Caen (15th century)

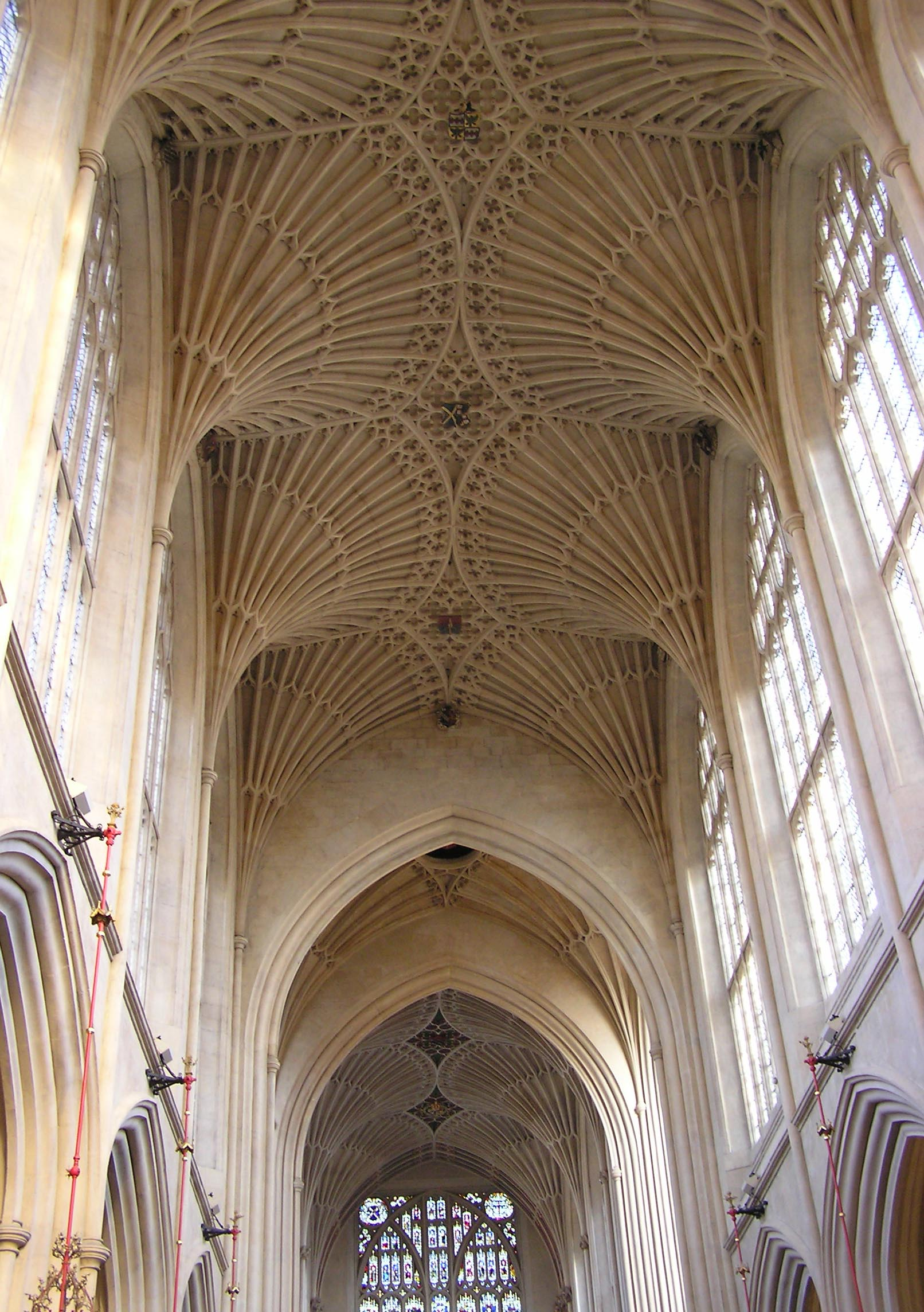
Fan vault in Bath Abbey (mostly 19th century)

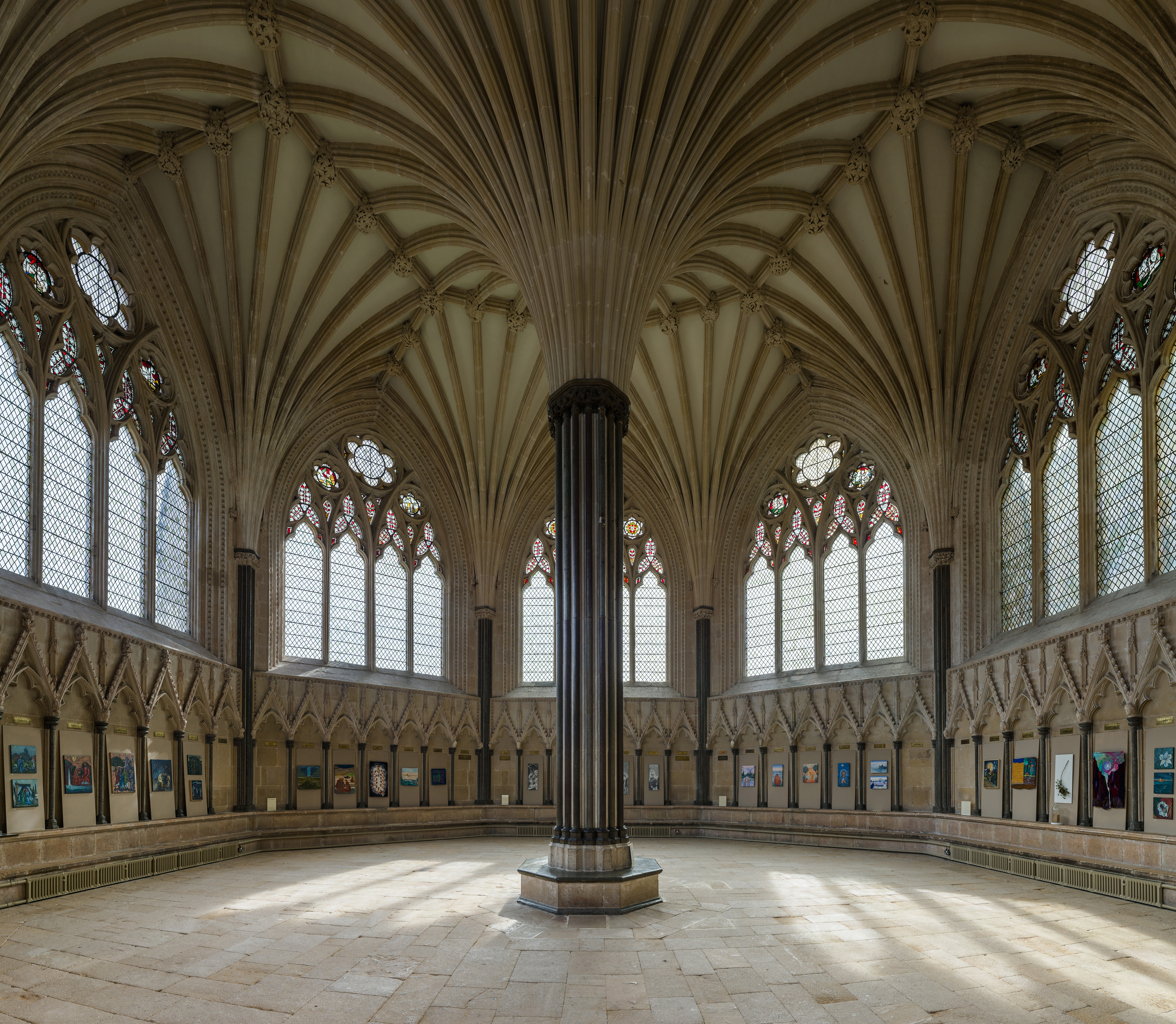
Tierceron vault in the chapter house of Wells Cathedral

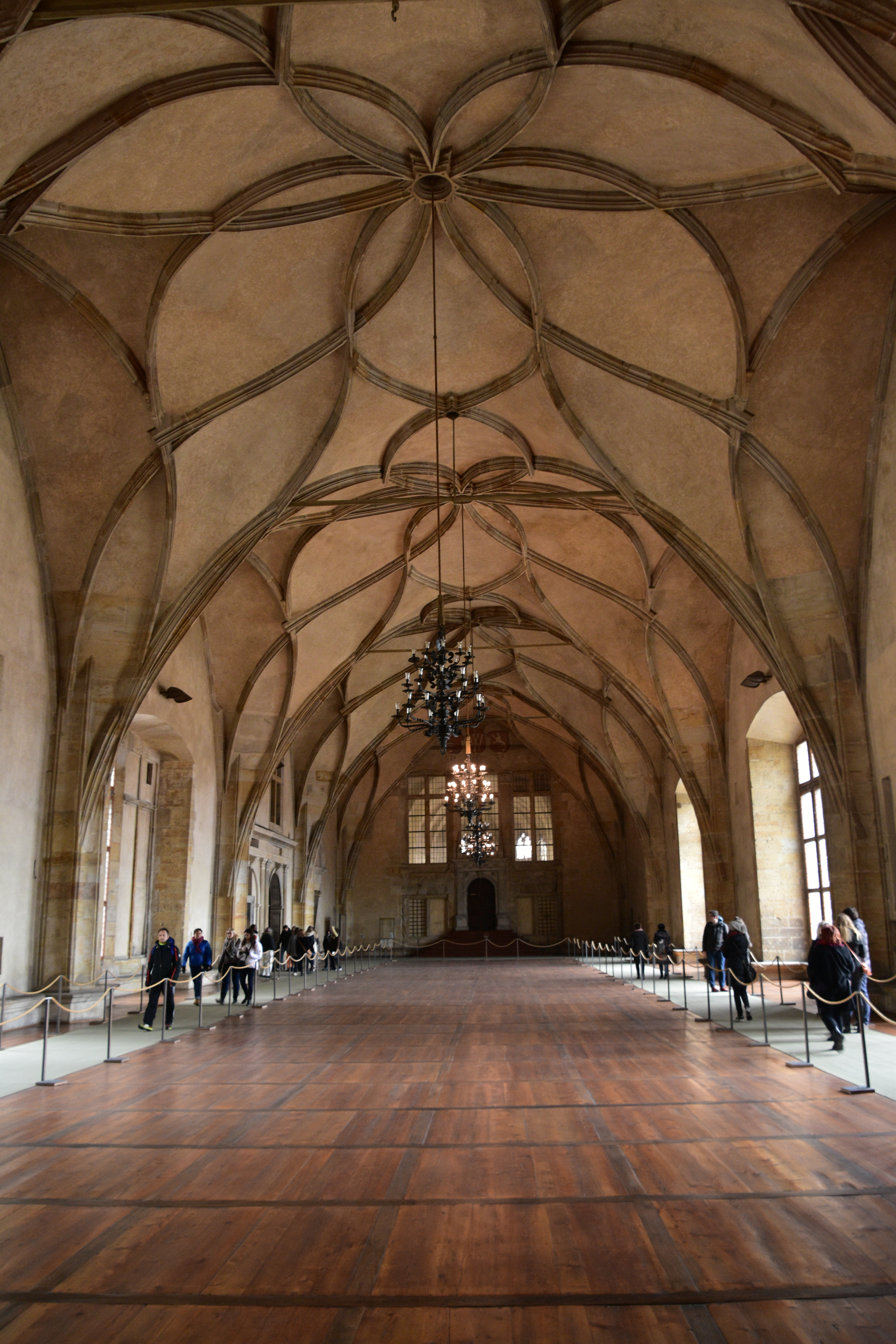
Sondergotik rib vault in the hall of Prague Castle

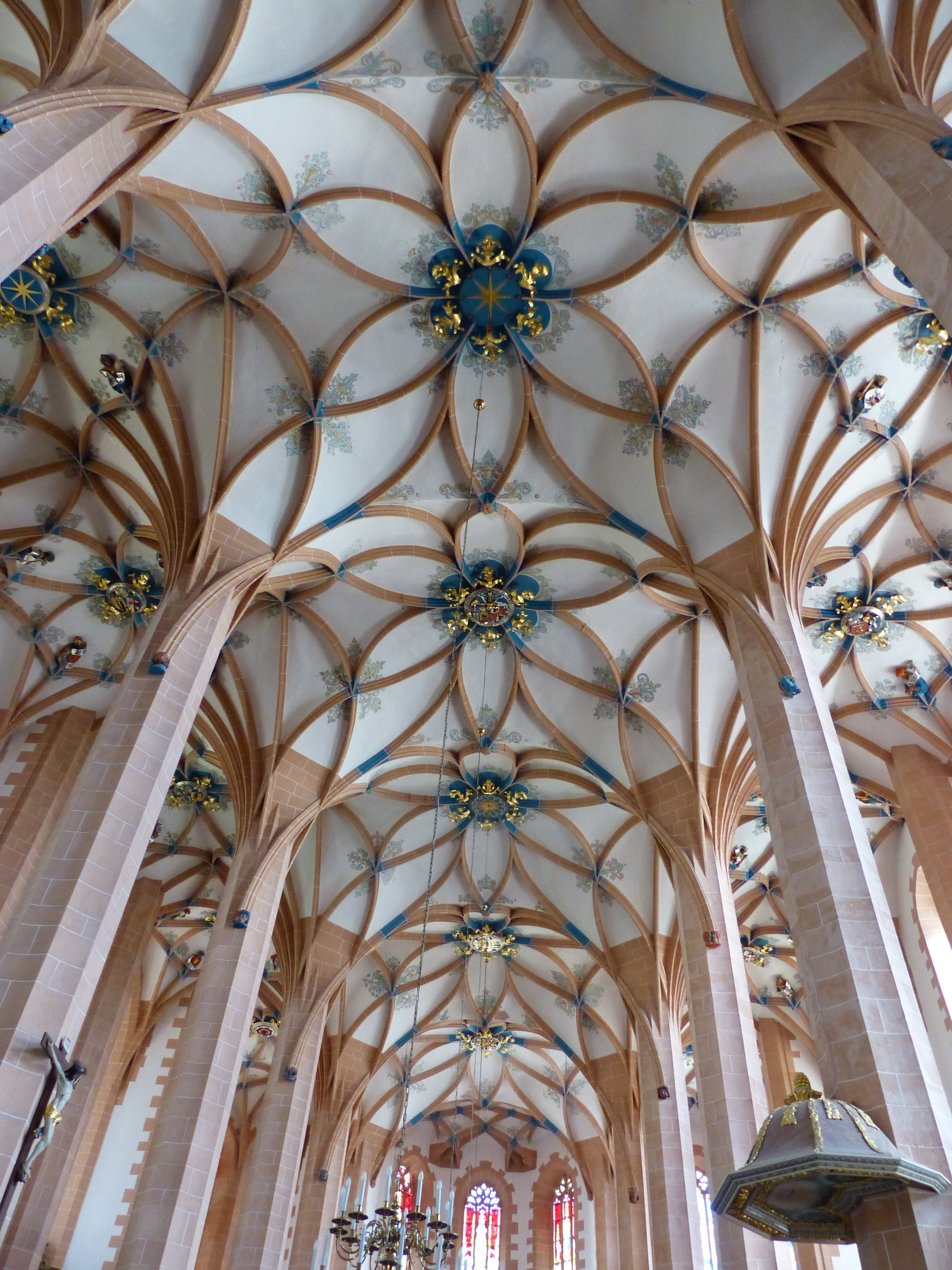
Sondergotik vault of St. Anne's Church in Annaberg-Buchholz (1499)

== Function ==
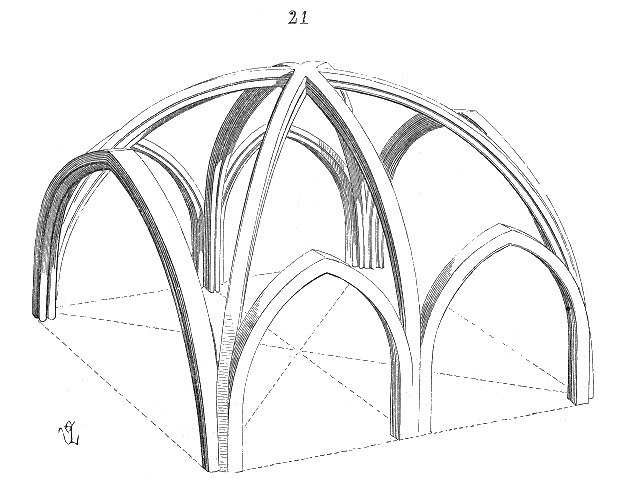
Structure of a six-part Gothic rib vault (Drawings by Eugène Viollet-le-Duc) The six-part vault could cover two bays of the nave, but required alternating pillars and columns to support the difference of weight distributed by the traverse and diagonal ribs.

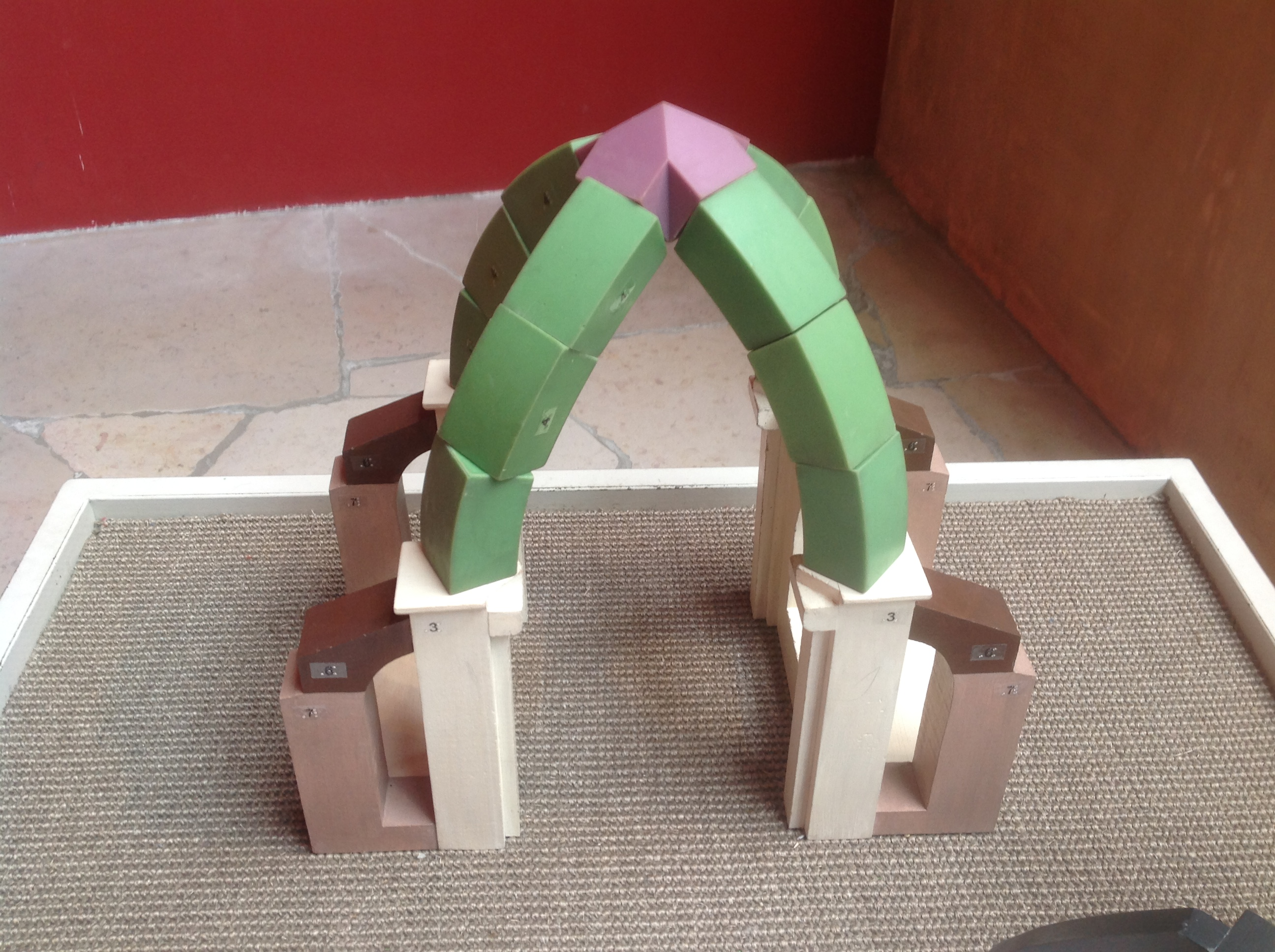
The dynamics of a rib vault, with outward and downward pressure from ribs balanced by columns and buttresses. The pieces in the model can stand by themselves, without cement. (National Museum of French Monuments, Paris)

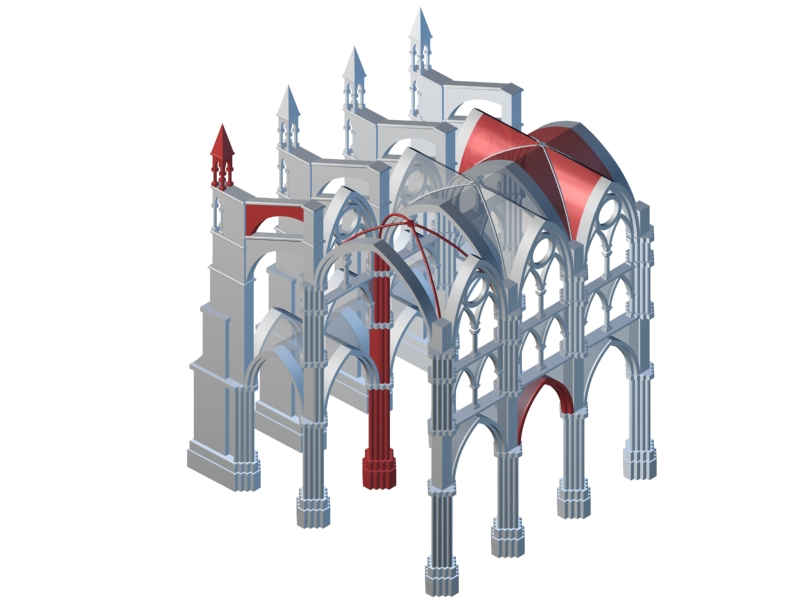
Rib vaults support the roof; they transfer the force of the weight outwards and downwards through a web of thin stone ribs, connected by thin pillars to the piers and columns below and to buttresses outside

Rib vaults are reinforced by a network of thin stone ribs. In the first six-part vaults, the vault was supported by two diagonal crossing ribs, plus an intermediate rib, which together divided the vault into six sections. The diagonal ribs were in the form of semicircular arches, which raised the centre of the vault above the level of the transverse arches and wall ribs, and gave it the appearance of a small dome. (This kind of vault can be seen in the nave of Sant' Ambrogio, Milan). In some new churches, the architects dealt with the problem by raising the upper part of their arches. This was tried in some of the earliest Gothic churches, notably the Abbaye-aux-Hommes and the Abbey of Lessay in Normandy.

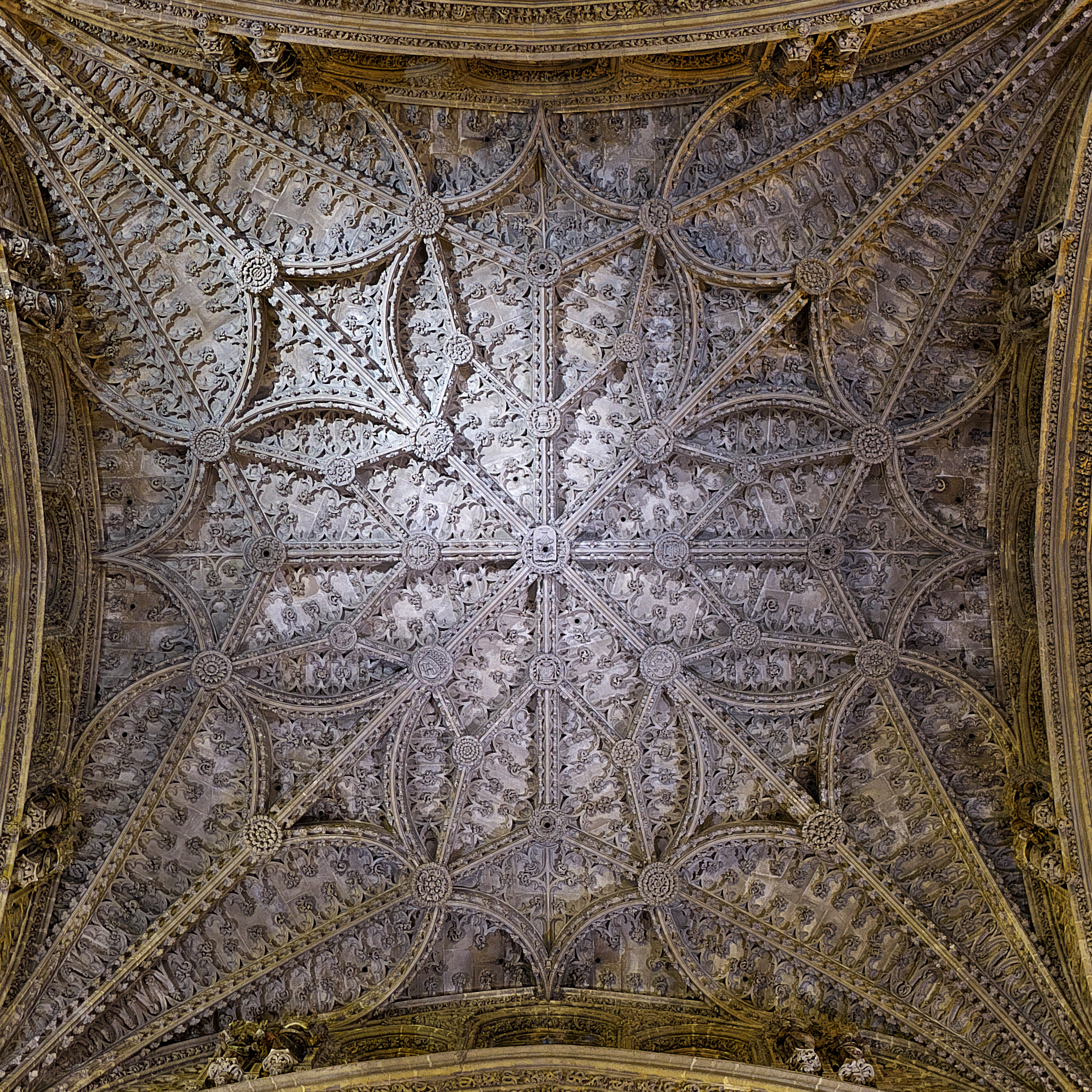
Crossing vault of Seville Cathedral by Juan Gil de Hontañón

The problem was ultimately solved by the introduction of the pointed arch for the transverse and dividing ribs of the vault. The pointed arch had long been known and employed, on account of its much greater strength and of the lessened thrust it exerted on the walls. When employed for the ribs of a vault, however narrow or wide the span might be, by adopting a pointed arch, its summit could be made to match the height of the diagonal ribs. The ribs carried the weight of the vault outwards and downwards. The ribs were bundled into columns, each combining four ribs, which descended the walls to the arcades on piers on the ground floor. Outside, the walls were given greater strength by the addition of heavy stone buttresses. The strength of rib vaults made it possible to have thinner walls, which in turn made it possible to have larger windows on the upper levels, filling the nave with light. They eventually made possible the enormous rose windows of Gothic cathedrals.

This six-part vault was successfully introduced in Noyon Cathedral, Laon Cathedral, and Notre-Dame de Paris. A single six-part vault could cover two traverse sections of the nave of Notre-Dame. However, the six-rib vault had its problems. The weight was not distributed evenly to the columns on the ground floor. When a vault covered two traverses, more massive piers were needed to bear the weight from the doubleaux, the diagonal ribs, than for the intermediate ribs. This problem was solved by simplifying the vault and eliminating the intermediate rib, making a four-part or quadripartite rib vault. Under this system, which was promptly used at Amiens Cathedral, Reims Cathedral and many others, each traverse section had just one four-part vault. This innovation, along with the use of the flying buttress, saw Gothic cathedral walls go higher and higher, with larger and larger windows.

The simplification of the rib vault was soon followed, particularly in England, by another tendency – to make them more complicated. One of the earliest examples of the introduction of the intermediate ridge rib is found in the nave of Lincoln Cathedral; This element, called a ridge rib, was not connected to the walls. Architects in England began adding new ribs, largely for decoration. In the nave of Exeter Cathedral three intermediate ribs were provided between the wall rib and the diagonal rib. In order to mask the junction of the various ribs, their intersections were ornamented with richly carved bosses, and this practice increased with the introduction of another short rib, known as lierne vaulting. The lierne, a term in France given to the ridge rib, in English refers to short ribs that cross between the main ones; these were employed chiefly as decorative features, for example in stellar vaults, one of the best examples of which is in the vault of the oriel window of Crosby Hall, London. Ribs came more and more numerous and more and more decorative leading to the extraordinarily elaborate and decorative fan vault.

== Construction ==
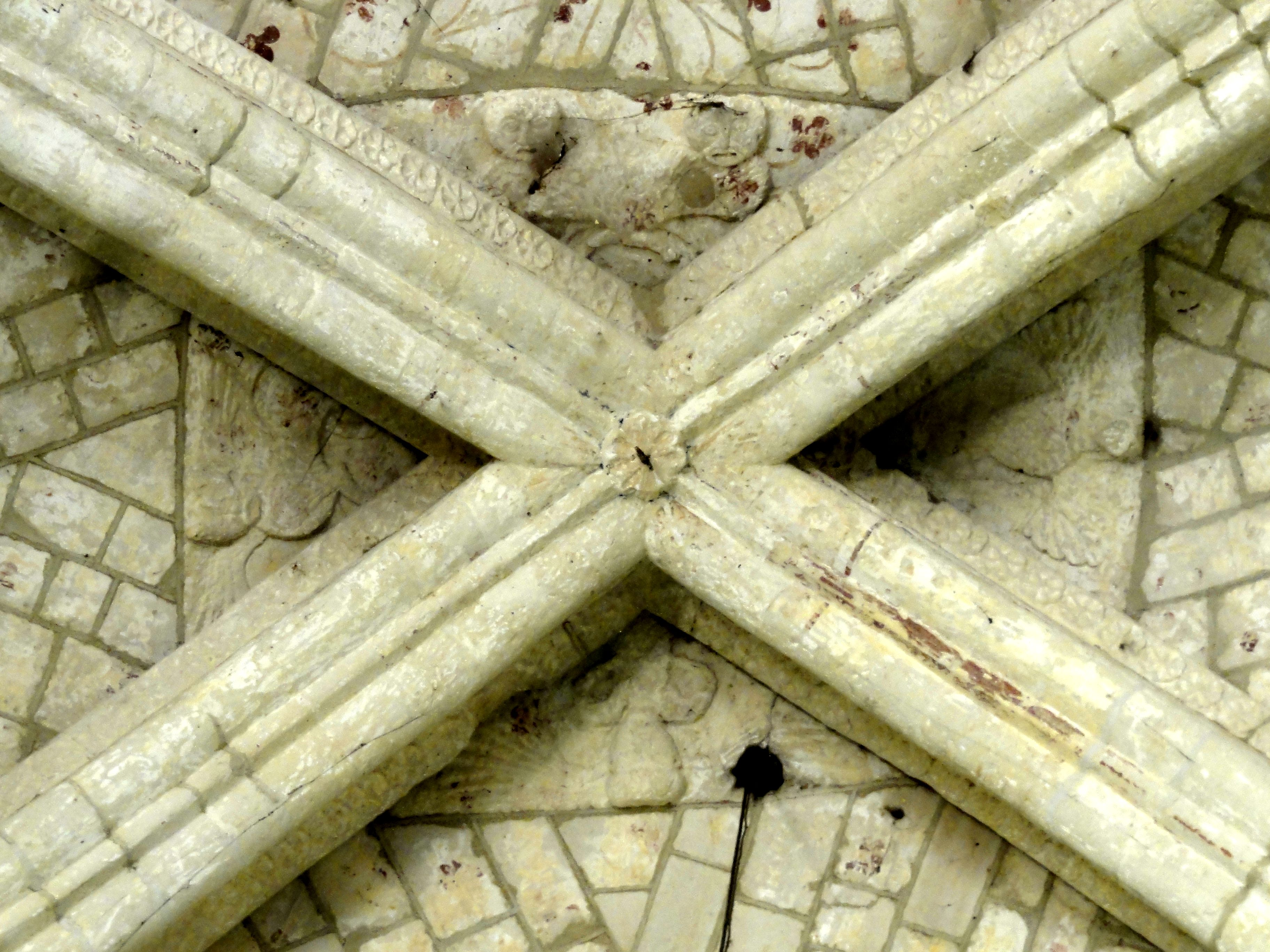
Keystone of a vault Church Notre-Dame in Morienval, Oise, (12th century)

The first step in the construction of a vault was a wooden scaffold up to the level of the top of the supporting columns. Next, a precise wooden frame was constructed on top of the scaffold in the exact shape of the ribs (French: nervures). The stone segments of the ribs were then carefully laid into the frame and joined with mortar. When the ribs were all in place, the keystone was placed at the apex where they converged. Once the keystone was in place, the ribs could stand alone, supported by their weight pressing downwards and outwards. Workers then filled in the compartments between the ribs with small fitted pieces of brick or stone. The framework was removed. The masonry of the compartments was about 15 cm thick. Once the compartments were finished, their interior surface was plastered and then painted.

The construction of a medieval rib vault was a complex operation involving a team of specialized workers. The masons included hewers (French: taileurs), who cut the stone; poseurs, who set the stones in place; and layers (morteliers), who joined the pieces together with mortar. These craftsmen worked alongside carpenters who built the complex scaffolds and models.

== See also ==
- Gothic architecture
- Gothic cathedrals and churches
- List of architectural vaults

== Bibliography ==
- Bechmann, Roland (2017). Les Racines des Cathédrales (in French). Payot. ISBN 978-2-228-90651-7.
- Ducher, Robert (2014). Caractéristique des Styles (in French). Flammarion. ISBN 978-2-0813-4383-2.
- Giese, Francine; Pawlak, Anna; Thome, Markus (2018). Tomb – Memory – Space: Concepts of Representation in Premodern Christian and Islamic Art (in German). Walter de Gruyter GmbH & Co KG. ISBN 9783110517347.
- Giese-Vögeli, Francine (2007). Das islamische Rippengewölbe: Ursprung, Form, Verbreitung [Islamic rib vaults: Origins, form, spread] (in German). Berlin: Gebr. Mann. ISBN 978-3-7861-2550-1.
- Harbison, Robert (2009). Travels in the History of Architecture. Reaktion Books. ISBN 9781861896902.
- Mignon, Olivier (2017). Architecture du Patrimoine Française – Abbayes, Églises, Cathédrales et Châteaux (in French). Éditions Ouest-France. ISBN 978-27373-7611-5.
- O'Reilly, Elizabeth Boyle (1921). How France Built Her Cathedrals – A study in the Twelfth and Thirteenth Centuries. Harper and Brothers.
- Renault, Christophe; Lazé, Christophe (2006). Les Styles de l'architecture et du mobilier (in French). Gisserot. ISBN 9-782877-474658.
- Texier, Simon, (2012), Paris Panorama de l'architecture de l'Antiquité à nos jours, Parigramme, Paris (in French), ISBN 978-2-84096-667-8
- Watkin, David (1986). A History of Western Architecture. Barrie and Jenkins. ISBN 0-7126-1279-3.
- Wenzler, Claude (2018), Cathédales Gothiques – un Défi Médiéval, Éditions Ouest-France, Rennes (in French) ISBN 978-2-7373-7712-9
