= Zühlke =

Zühlke is a German surname. Notable people with the surname include:

- Detlef Zühlke (born 1949), German engineer and professor
- Liesl Zühlke (born 1968), South African cardiologist
- Steffen Zühlke (born 1965), German rower
