= Bad Pyrmont =

- Town
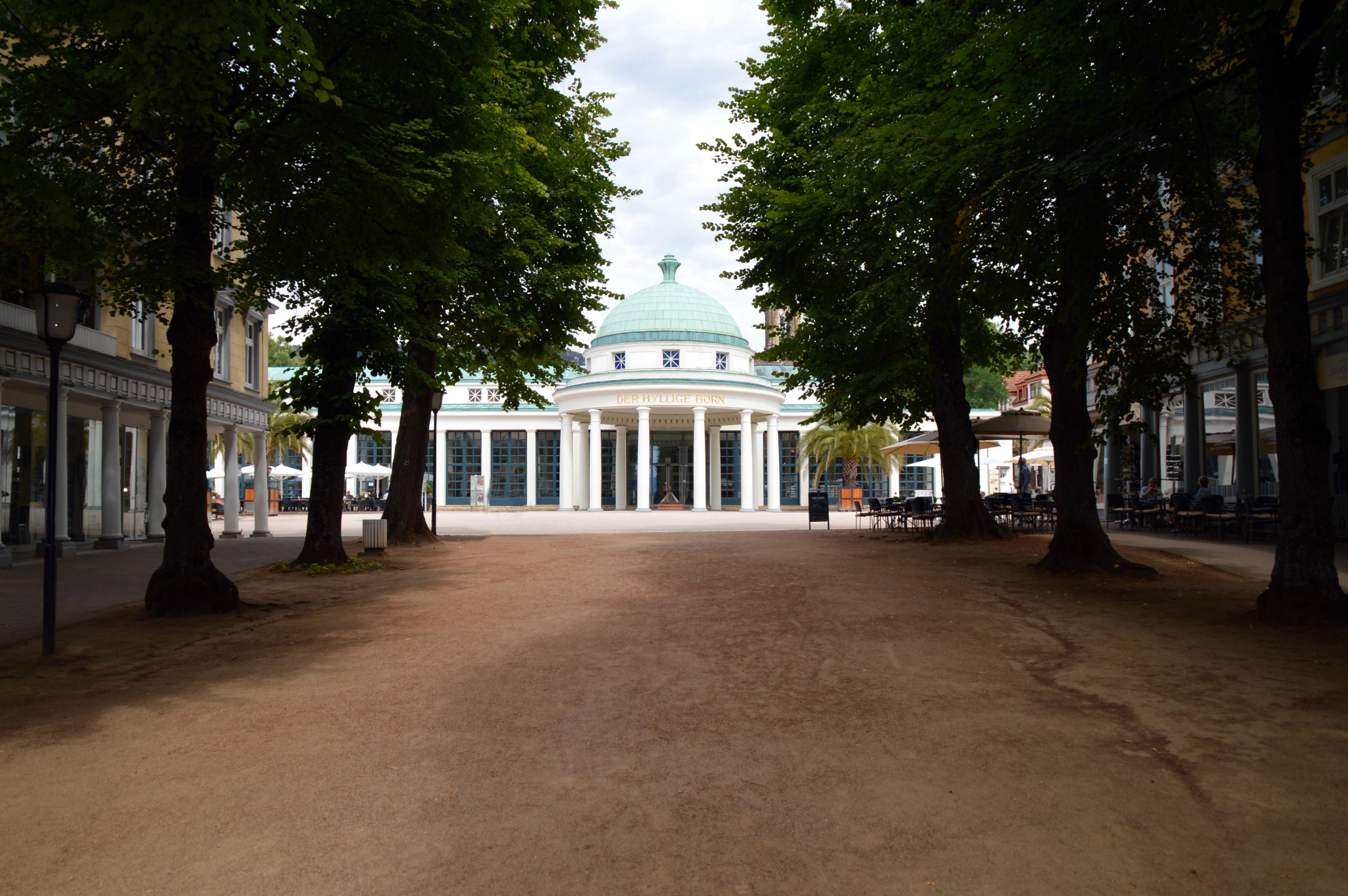
- Bad Pyrmont Holy Bath

- Coat of arms

- Location of Bad Pyrmont within Hameln-Pyrmont district
- Interactive map of Bad Pyrmont
- Location within Germany Location within Lower Saxony
- Coordinates: 51°59′12″N 09°15′49″E
- Country: Germany
- State: Lower Saxony
- District: Hameln-Pyrmont
- Subdivisions: 9 subdivisions

Government
  - Mayor (2021–26): Klaus Blome (CDU)

Area
  - Total: 61.99 km^{2} (23.93 sq mi)

Population (2025-12-31)
  - Total: 19,715
  - Density: 318.0/km^{2} (823.7/sq mi)
- Time zone: UTC+01:00 (CET)
  - Summer (DST): UTC+02:00 (CEST)
- Postal codes: 31812
- Dialling codes: 05281
- Vehicle registration: HM
- Website: www.stadt-badpyrmont.de

Bad Pyrmont (German: [baːt pʏʁˈmɔnt], also: [- ˈpʏʁ-]; West Low German: Bad Purmunt) is a town in the district of Hamelin-Pyrmont, in Lower Saxony, Germany, with a population close to 19,000. It is located on the river Emmer, about 10 km (6.2 mi) west of the Weser. Bad Pyrmont is a popular spa resort that gained its reputation as a fashionable place for princely vacations in the 17th and 18th centuries. The town is also the center of the Religious Society of Friends (Quakers) in Germany.

== History ==
Formerly called Pyrmont, it was the seat of a small county during much of the Middle Ages. The county gained its independence from the County of Schwalenberg in 1194. Independence was maintained until the extinction of the comital line in 1494, when the county was inherited by the County of Spiegelberg. In 1557, the county was inherited by Lippe, then by the County of Gleichen in 1583.

In 1625, the county became part of the much larger County of Waldeck through inheritance. In 1668, the Reichskammergericht (Imperial Chamber Court) ruled against the Bishopric of Paderborn's claims that Pyrmont had been collateral in a loan, confirming the Count of Waldeck's rights over Pyrmont, who ceded the Amt of Lügde — previously the county's capital — to the bishopric in compensation. In January 1712, the Count of Waldeck and Pyrmont was elevated to hereditary prince by Emperor Charles VI, the count having combined the two titles the previous year.

For a brief period, from 1805 to 1812, Pyrmont was again a separate principality as a result of inheritance and partition after the death of the previous prince, but the two parts were united again in 1812. The principality of Waldeck-Pyrmont retained its status after the Congress of Vienna of 1815 and became a member of the German Confederation. In 1813, the inhabitants of Pyrmont began to protest at their lack of autonomy within Waldeck–Pyrmont and the separate constitutional nature of the two territories was confirmed the following year, until a formal union was established in 1849.

From 1868 onward, the principality was administered by Prussia, but retained its legislative sovereignty. Prussian administration served to reduce administrative costs for the small state and was based on a ten-year contract that was repeatedly renewed. In 1871 it became a constituent state of the new German Empire. At the end of World War I, during the German Revolution the prince abdicated and Waldeck–Pyrmont became a free state within the Weimar Republic. On 30 November 1921, following a local plebiscite, the town and district of Pyrmont were detached and incorporated into the Prussian Province of Hanover, with Waldeck following into the Prussian province of Hesse-Nassau in 1929.

== Economy ==
As a spa town, Bad Pyrmont's economy is heavily geared towards tourism.

Bad Pyrmonter mineral water is bottled in Bad Pyrmont.

== Attractions ==
Bad Pyrmont features a large Kurpark, with a sizeable outdoor palm garden. The Baroque castle (1706–10) is part of a substantial complex of fortifications dating from the 16th century. The castle now houses the Museum of Municipal and Spa History.

== Notable people ==
- Emil Albes (1861–1923), German actor
- Max Born (1882–1970), Physicist, Nobel Prize winner and grandfather of Olivia Newton-John, spent his last years in Bad Pyrmont
- Rainer Brüninghaus (born 1949), German composer and jazz pianist
- Ferdinand Büchner (1823–1906), German flautist and composer
- Friedrich Drake (1805–1882), German sculptor
- Thomas Klenke (born 1966), German racing driver
- Paul-Gerhard Klumbies (born 1957), German protestant theologian
- Caren Marks (born 1964), German politician (SPD)
- Johannes Schraps (born 1983), German politician (SPD)
- Sigrid Sternebeck (born 1949), former member of the Red Army Faction
- Theodor Stroefer (1843–1927), German publisher
- Thomas Webel (born 1954), German politician (CDU)
- Helmut Wildt (1922–2007), German actor
- Detlef Zühlke (born 1947), German engineer and professor

== Gallery ==
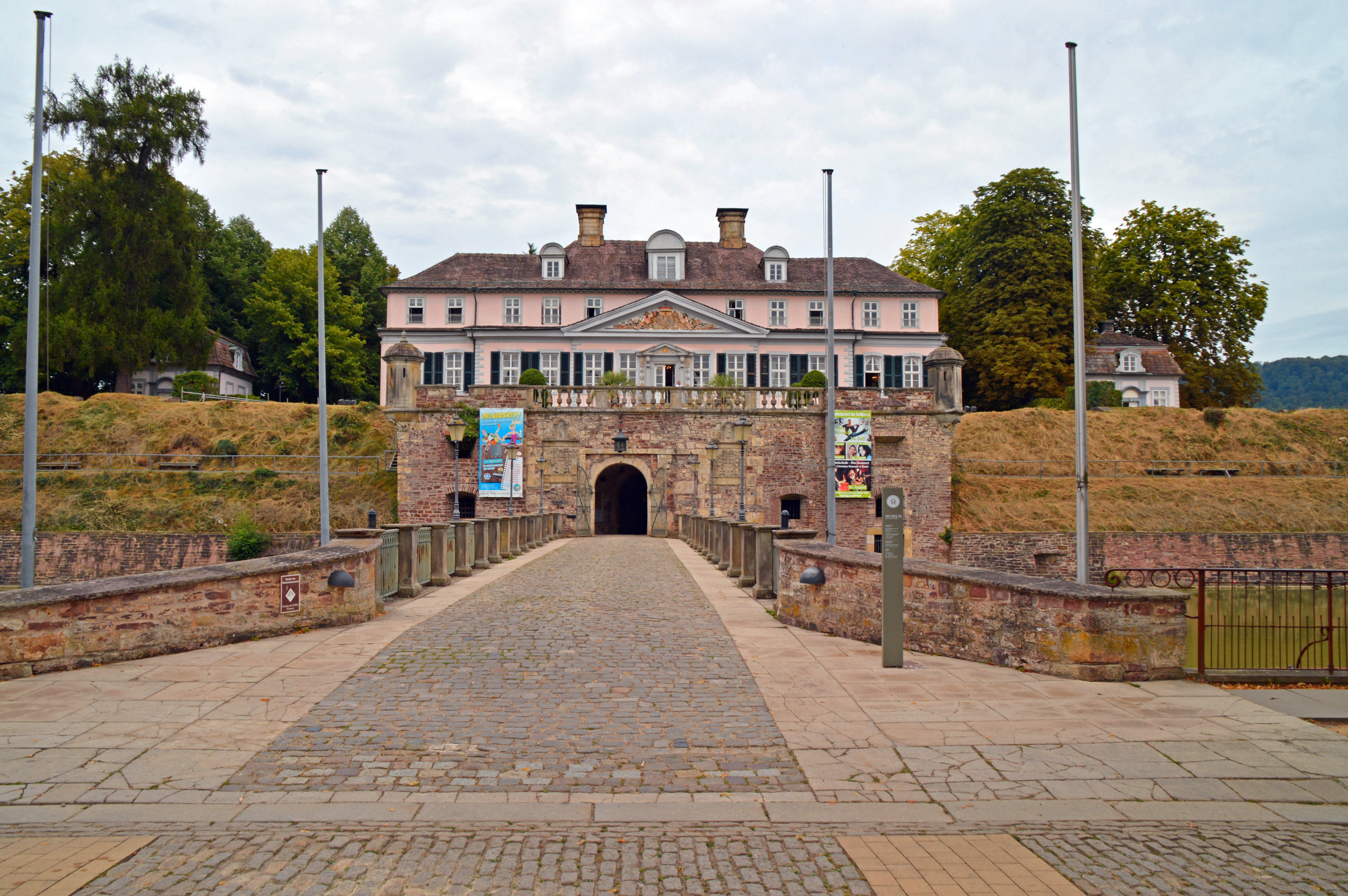
Pyrmont Castle

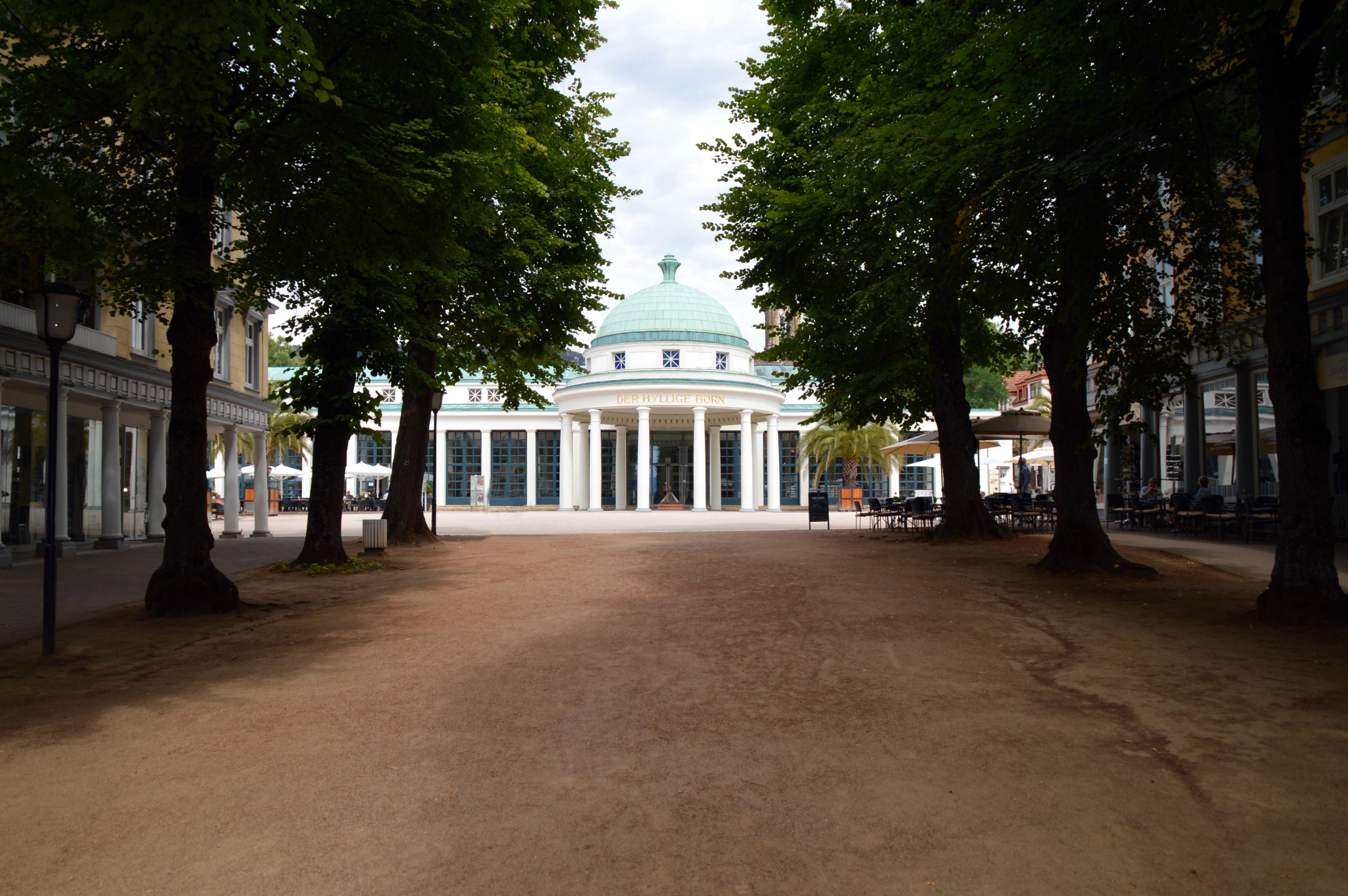
Hylligen Born (Holy bath)

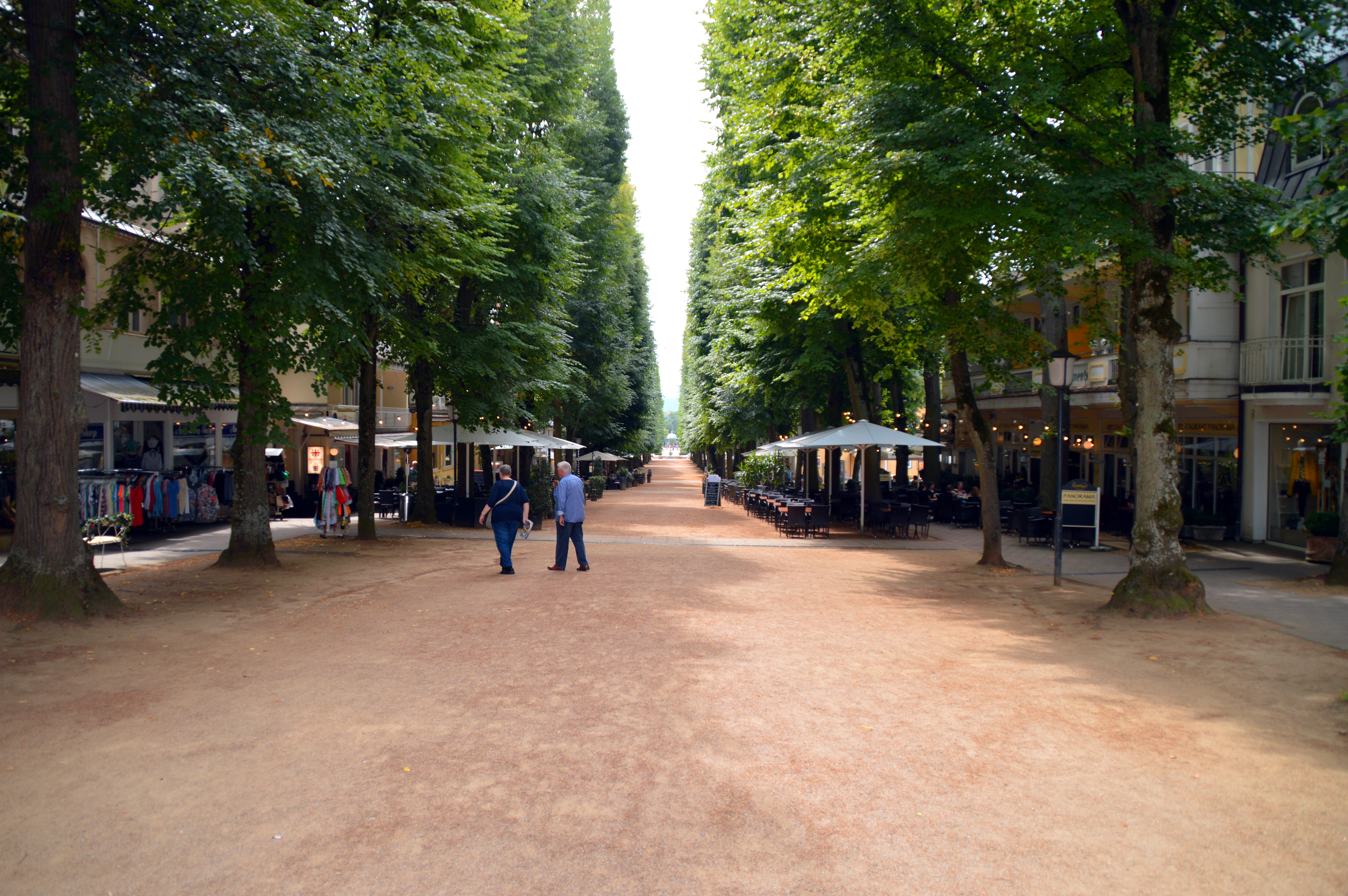
The Avenue

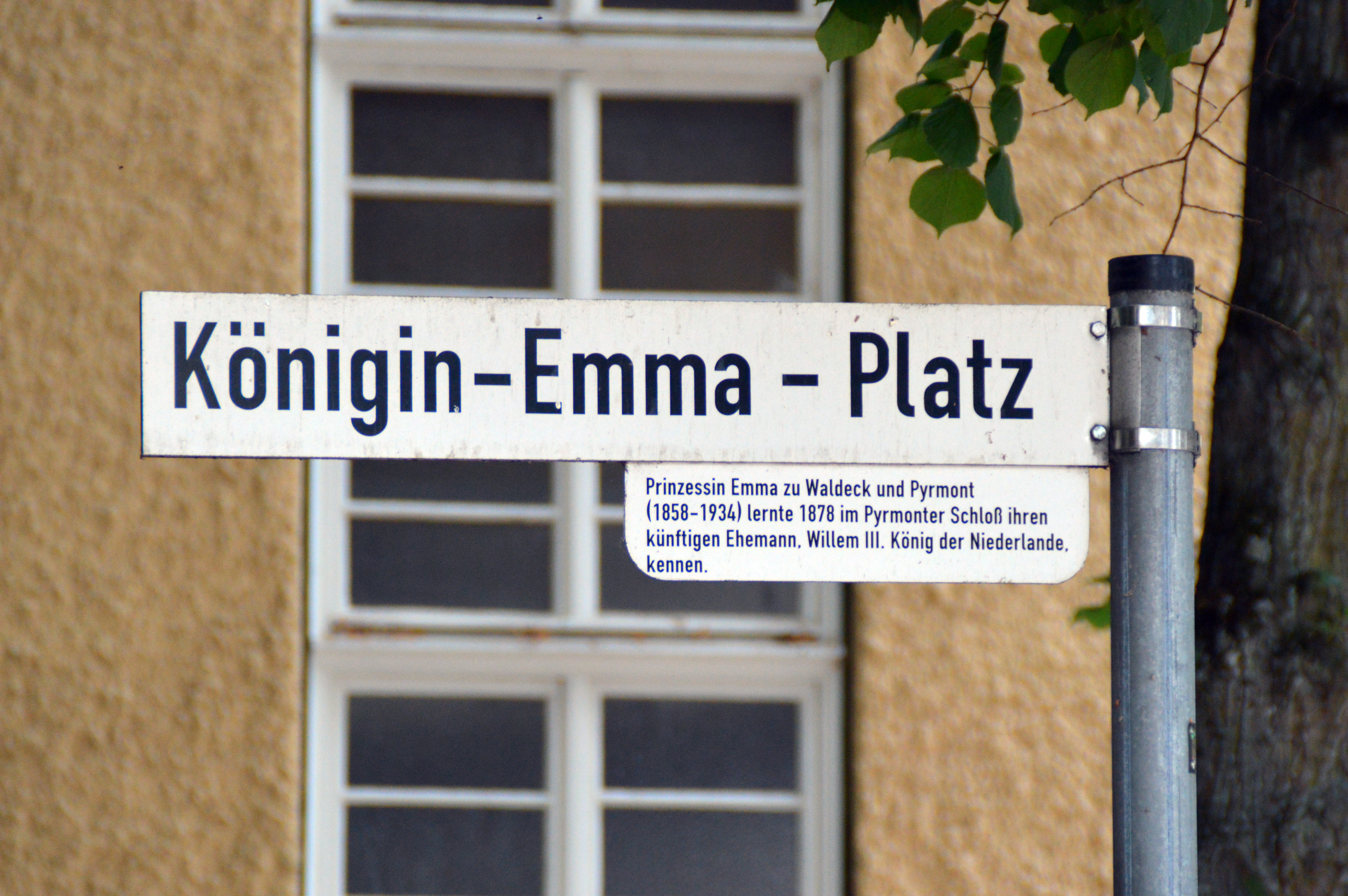
Königin-Emma-Platz (Queen Emma square)

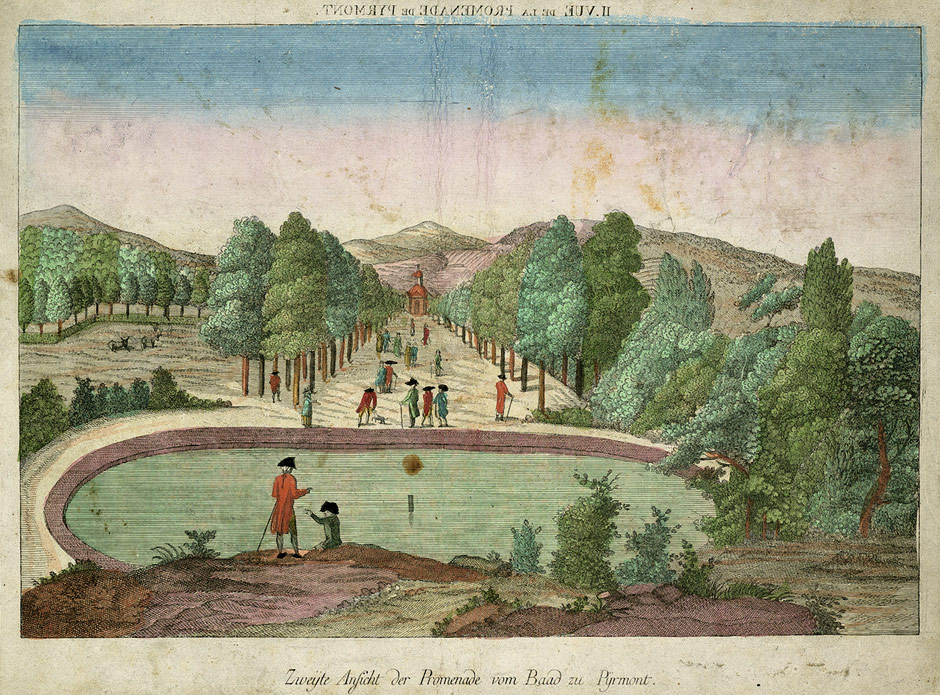
The Avenue between the baths and Pyrmont, 1780

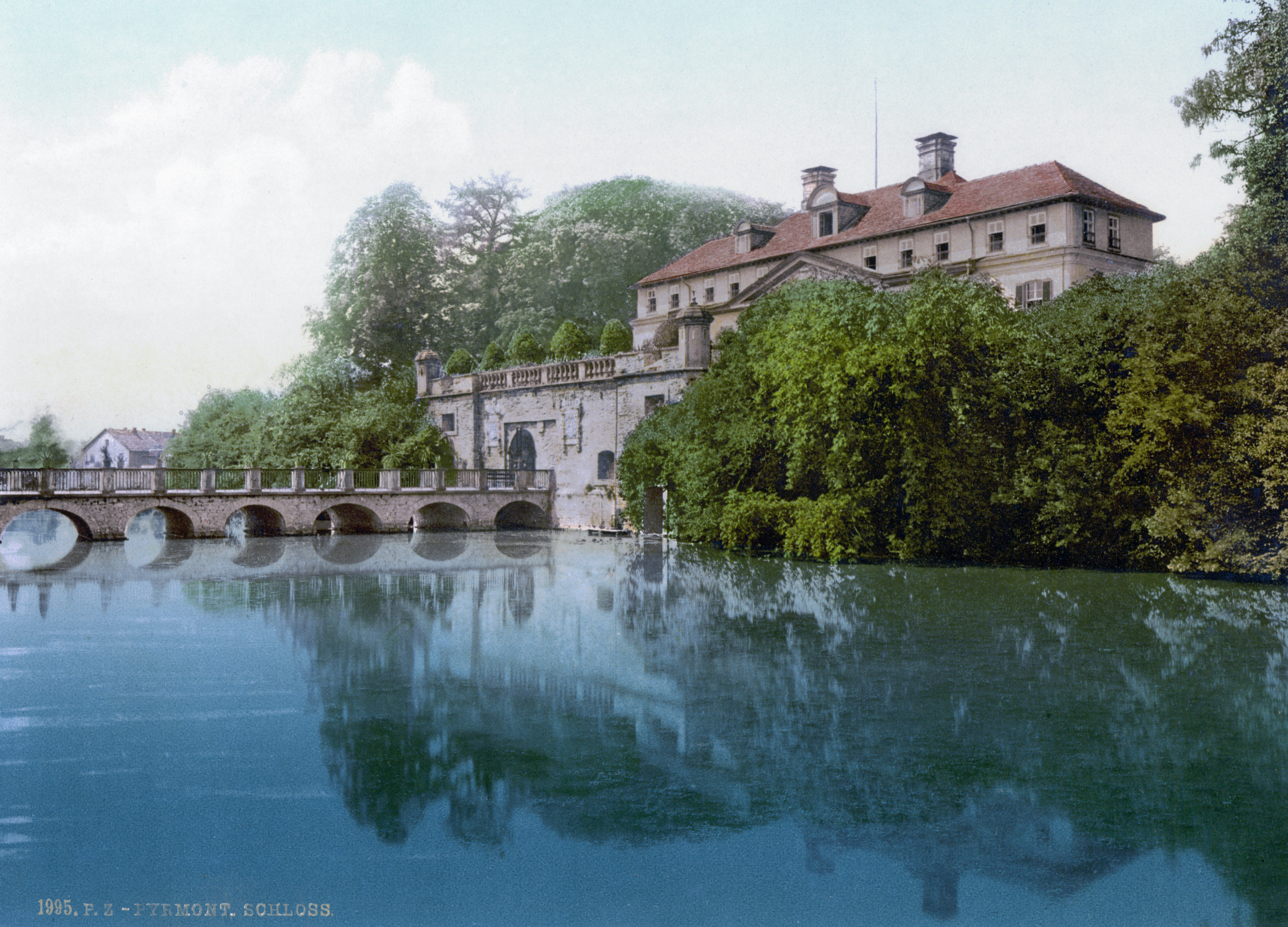
Pyrmont Castle, 1900

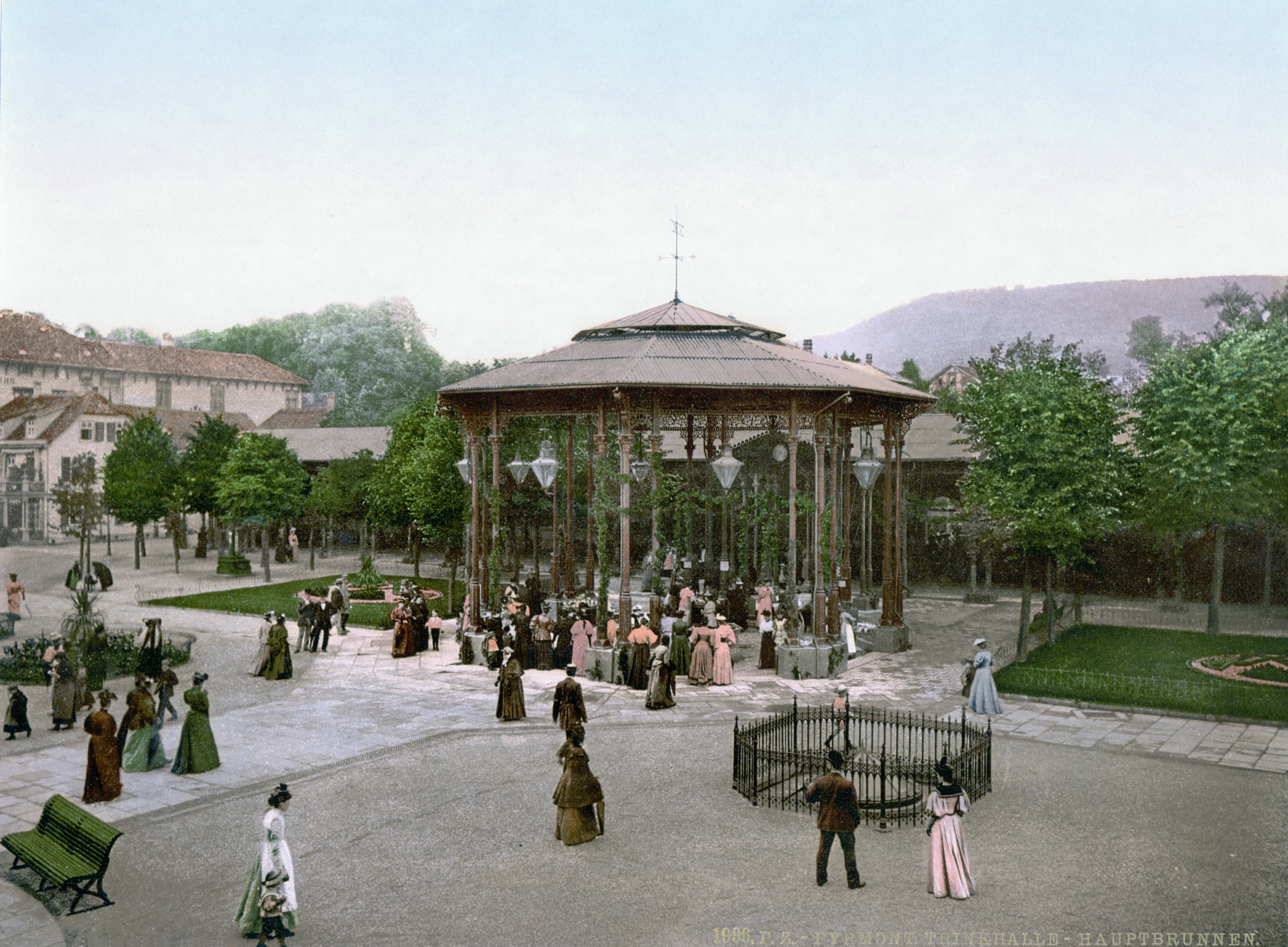
Pyrmont baths, 1900

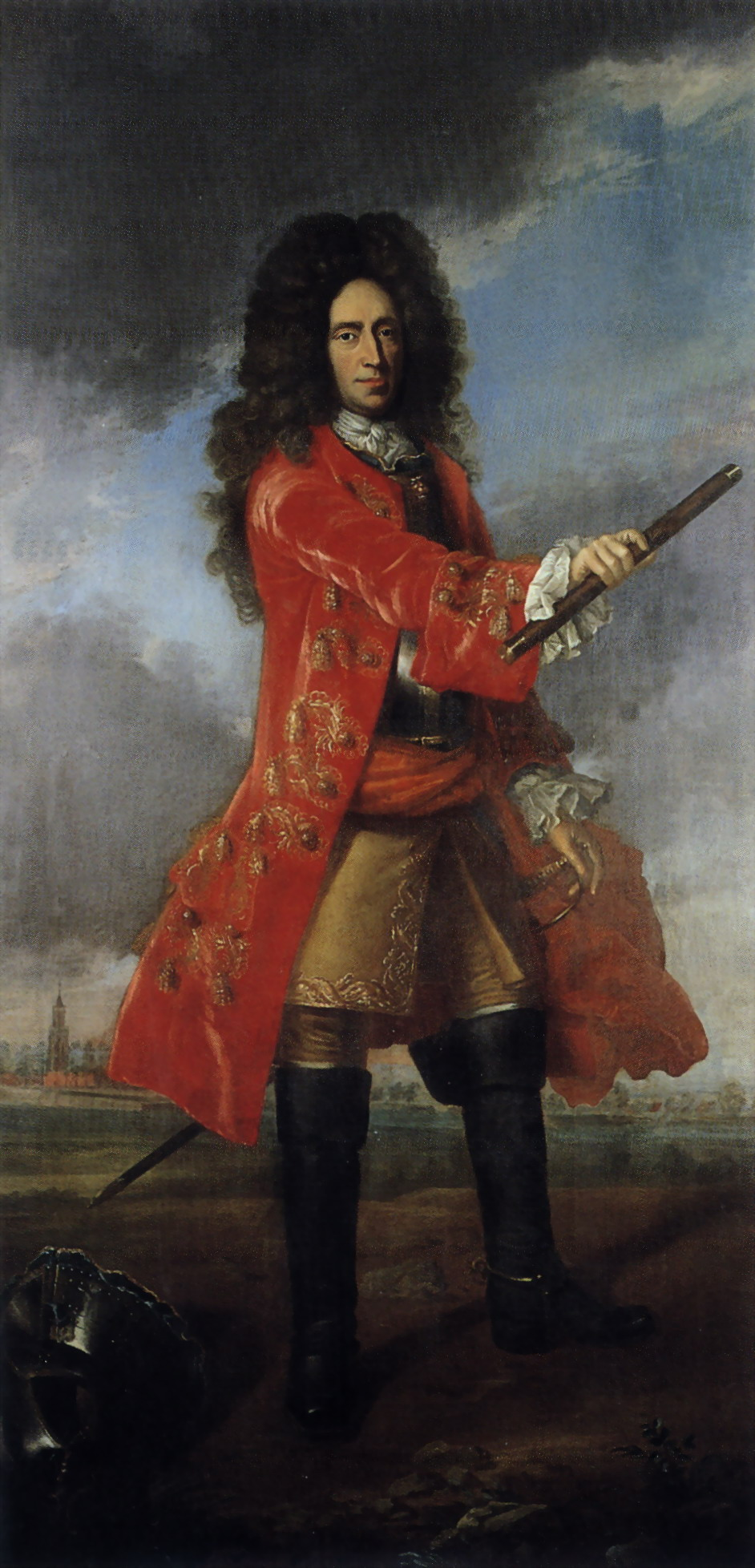
Georg Fredrik, c. 1750

== Twin towns – sister cities ==
Bad Pyrmont is twinned with:

- Anzio, Italy

== See also ==
- Hannover–Braunschweig–Göttingen–Wolfsburg Metropolitan Region
- Pyrmont, New South Wales, a suburb of Sydney named after Bad Pyrmont
