= Rudolf von Seitz =

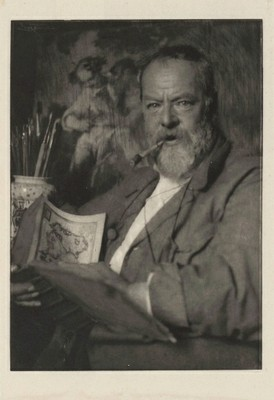
- Photo of Rudolf von Seitz by Frank Eugene
- Born: Rudolf Seitz; 15 June 1842; Munich
- Died: 18 June 1910 (aged 68); Munich
- Occupations: Painter, illustrator, designer, restorer, art dealer
- Father: Franz von Seitz

Rudolf von Seitz (15 June 1842 – 18 June 1910) was a German painter, illustrator, and designer.

== Career ==
After early art instruction from his father, decorative painter and illustrator Franz von Seitz, Rudolf enrolled in 1857 at the Academy of Fine Arts, Munich where his teachers included Karl von Piloty and Hermann Anschütz. He began with genre paintings such In Peter Vischer’s Gießhütte zu Nürnberg (trans. In Peter Vischer's Foundry in Nuremberg), but then turned primarily to illustration, applied arts and decorative painting.

Seitz's work ranged from providing the ornamental frames and print decorations in the rococo style for magnificent editions of Goethe's Faust and Schiller's Glocke, with illustrations by Sándor Liezen-Mayer, to elaborately painting the ceiling of the Bavarian court bakers and designing their bread stamps (signa pistoris).

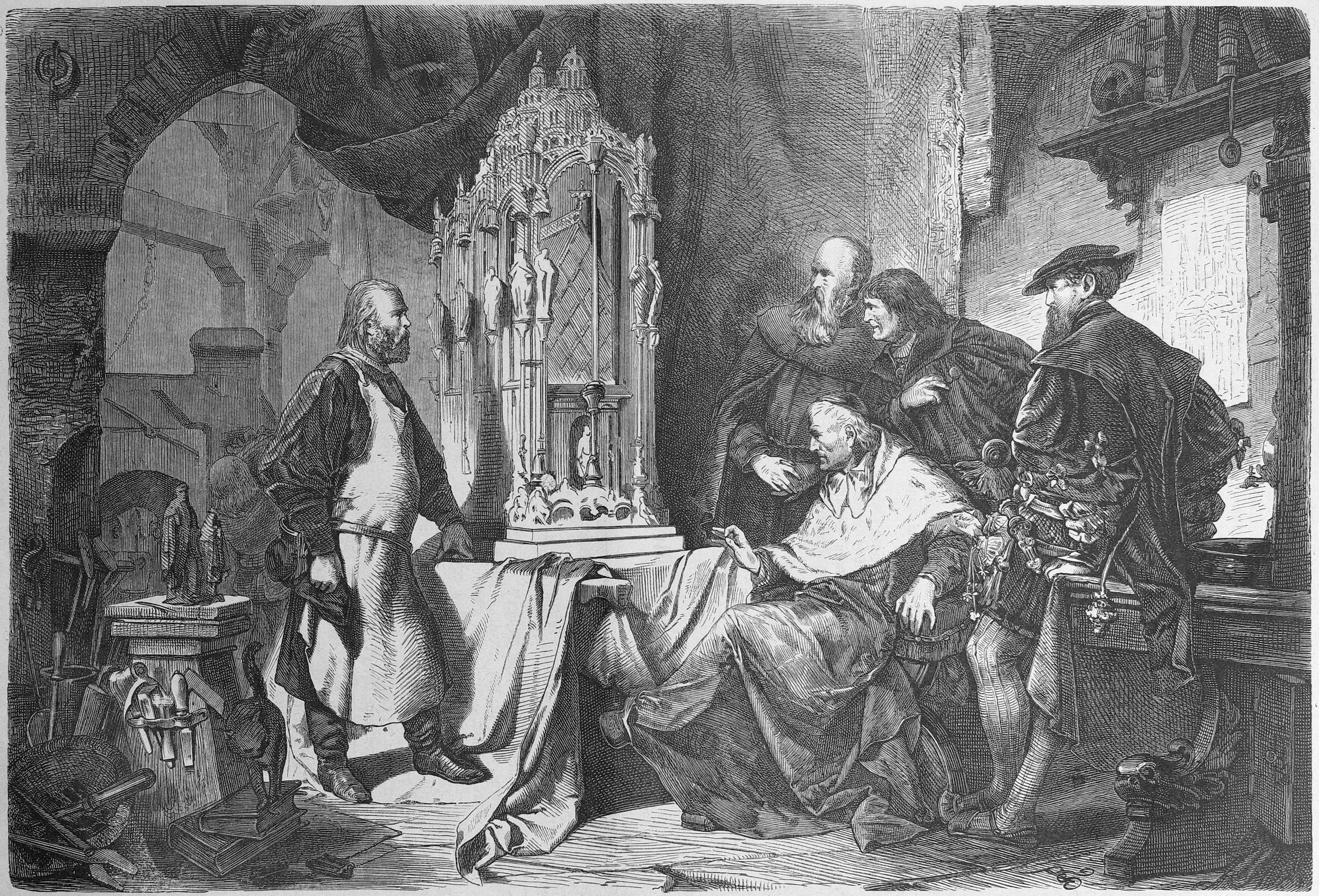
Engraving of In Peter Vischer’s Gießhütte zu Nürnberg based on an original drawing by Rudolf Seitz, in Die Gartenlaube, 1867, p. 501)

Seitz preferred the style of the German late Renaissance and Rococo, and was a leader in the Munich Kunstgewerbeverein (applied arts society), where Seitz and other leading artists designed all kinds of decorations, pageants, costumes, illustrations, graphics, and more.

In 1878, together with architect Gabriel von Seidl, Seitz founded the design company "Das Renaissancemagazin Seitz & Seidl", where Emanuel von Seidl soon also worked and took over the management of the interior decoration studio. The successful company existed until 1898, and its projects included the new Bavarian National Museum. Seitz could design a complete range of interior furnishings: furniture, wall/ceiling paintings and ornamentation, chandeliers, windows, tapestries, .... Along with his father, Seitz designed much of the interior, including many porcelain objects, for the Linderhof Palace of King Ludwig II.

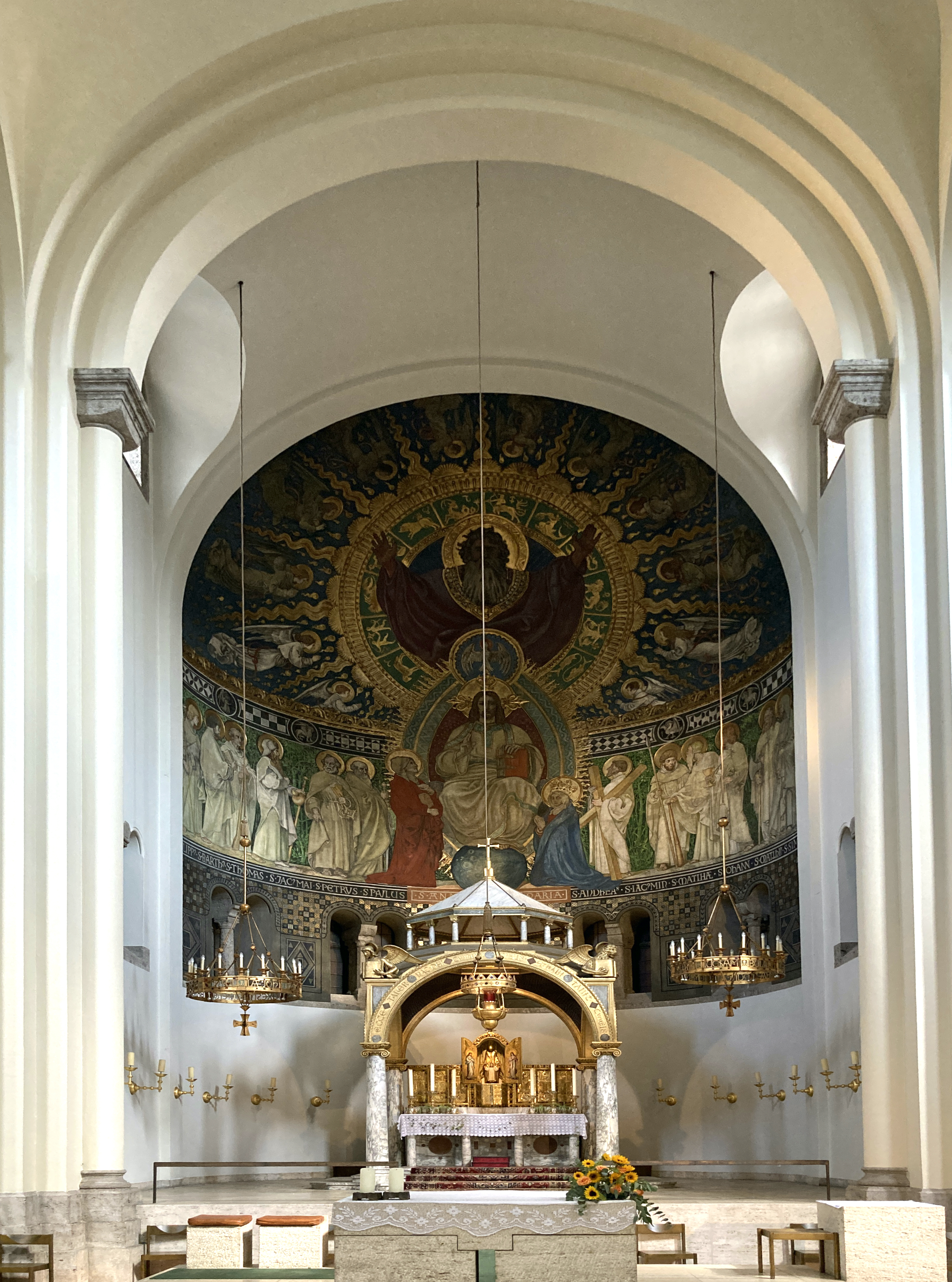
Seitz's fresco in St. Anna im Lehel depicting the Holy Trinity, Mary (right), her mother Anna (left), and the apostles.

Richard Wagner asked Seitz to design "characterful, poetic and simple" costumes for the 1882 premiere of Parsifal. Seitz's spent a year on the designs, but they were ultimately rejected by Wagner as "too bejewelled or too reminiscent of ballet and masquerade".

In 1883 Seitz was appointed curator at the National Museum in Munich, and in 1888 he became a professor at the Munich Academy of Fine Arts, where he established an academic program in art restoration. Among his students were Franz Xaver Dietrich, Julius Diez, Max Frey, Julius Mössel, Richard Throll, and Rihards Zariņš. Seitz's work from this era includes the large fresco in the apse of St. Anna im Lehel church in Munich in 1897 and many other ceiling and wall paintings, illustrations in Jugend (magazine) such as Sommer (1898, No. 37, p. 612), Bismark (1898, No. 3, cover), and a 1905 bare-bottomed sculpture of Saint Florian adorning a water fountain in Bad Tölz.

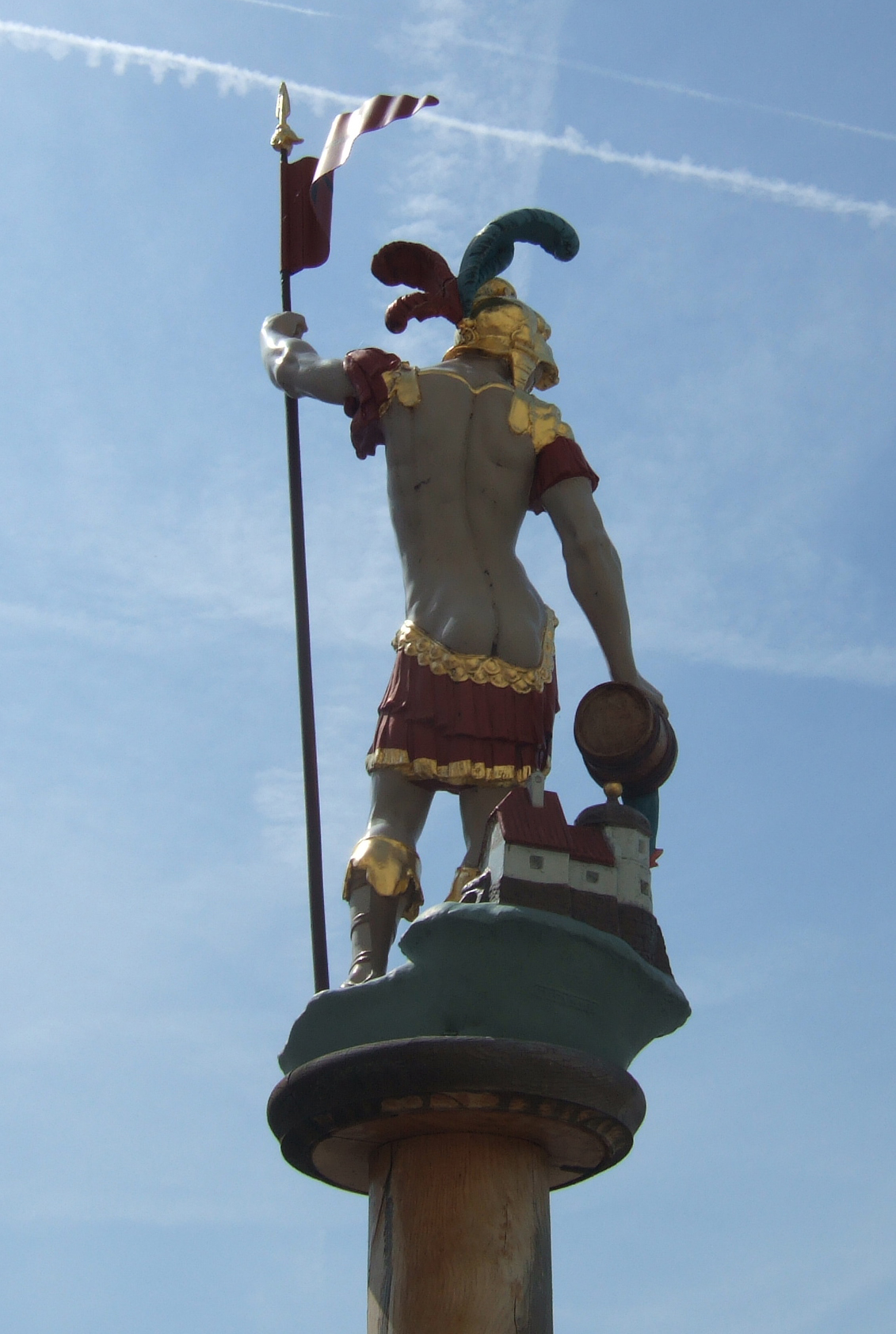
Saint Florian fountain sculpture in Bad Tölz

== Personal life ==
Seitz married Carolina Paulina Marotte de Montigny (born c. 1844) in Seeon Abbey in 1869 and had a son, Hans. Carolina came from a Belgian noble family, who had been admitted to the Bavarian baronial ranks with her father Karl Marotte de Montigny in 1842. Seitz was ennobled as a Knight of the Order of Merit of the Bavarian Crown in 1900.

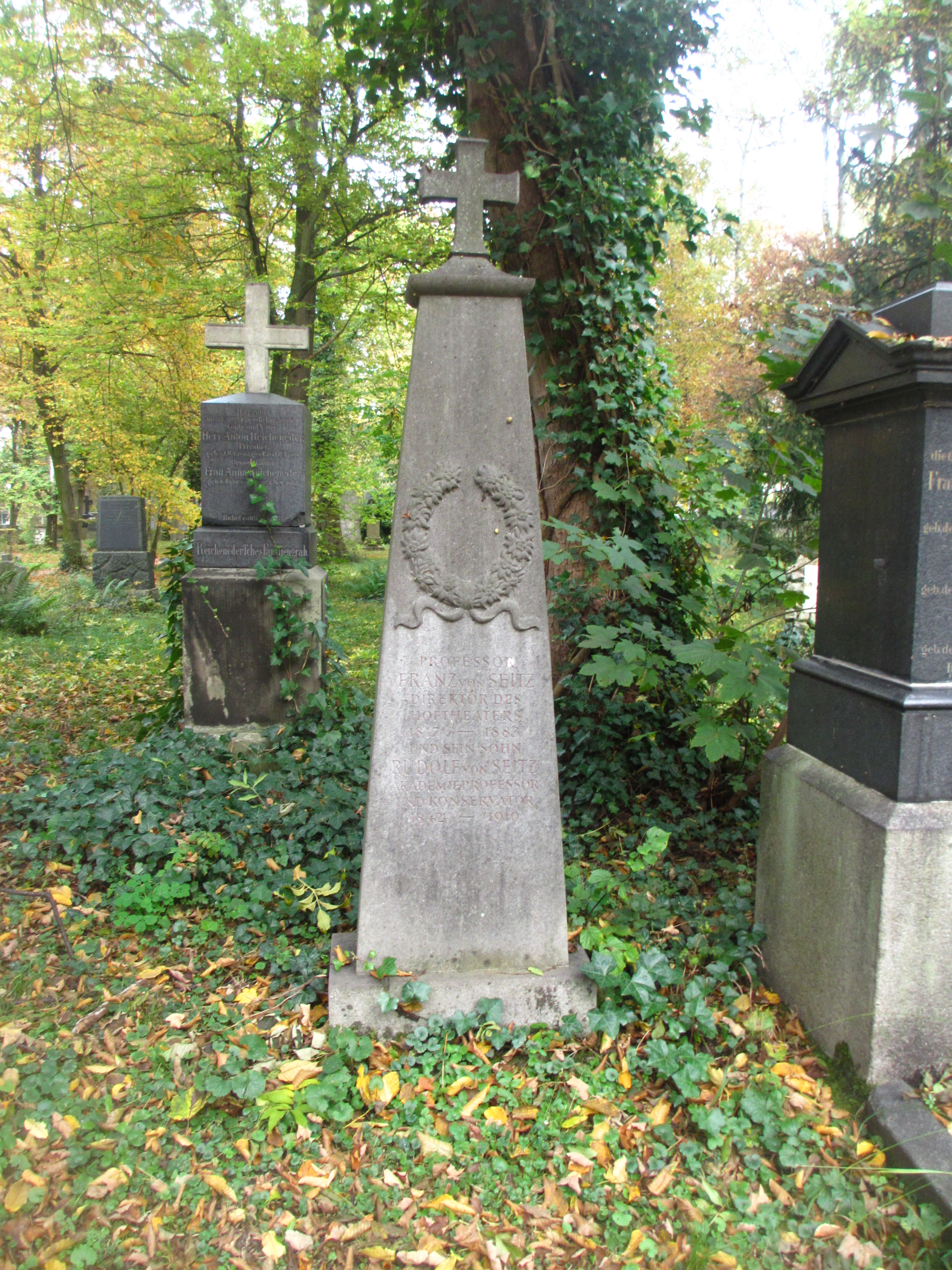
Grave of Rudolf Seitz and his father in Munich's Alter Südfriedhof cemetery (Field 25 - Row 13 - Plot 36).

After his death, an anecdote was published in many American papers,^{e.g.} telling of a fourteen-year boy who tried to get Seitz's autograph by a fraudulent letter, to which Seitz purportedly replied:

It often happens here on earth
That little rogues to great ones grow.
Some autographs for which you're trying
Can be procured without much lying.
