= Franz Seitz =

Franz Seitz may refer to:

- Franz Seitz Sr. (1887–1952), German film director
- Franz Seitz Jr. (1921–2006), German film producer

== See also ==
- Franz von Seitz (1817–1883), German painter, lithographer, engraver and costume designer as well as an art teacher and theatre director
