= Webel =

Webel may refer to:

- Richard K. Webel (1900-2000), American landscape architect
- Thomas Webel (born 1954), German politician
- West Bengal Electronics Industry Development Corporation, a government of West Bengal company
