= Theodor Stroefer =

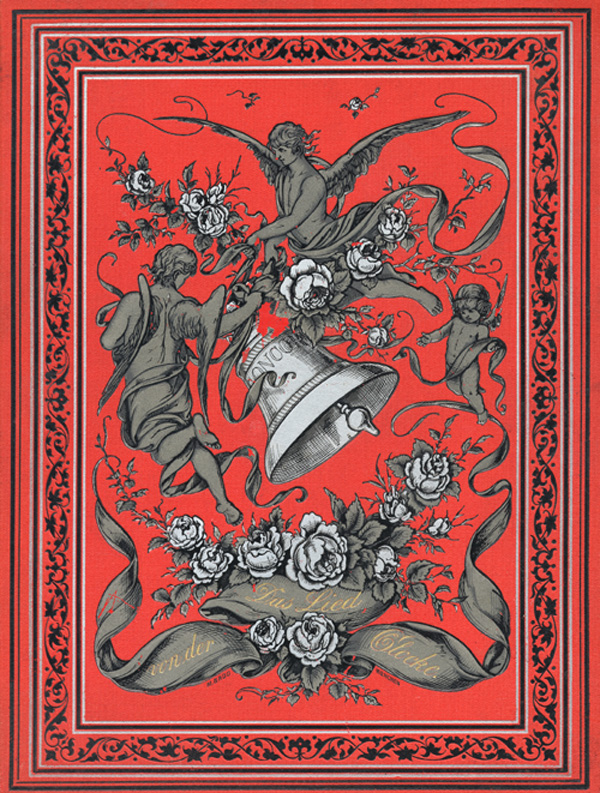
Das Lied von der Glocke

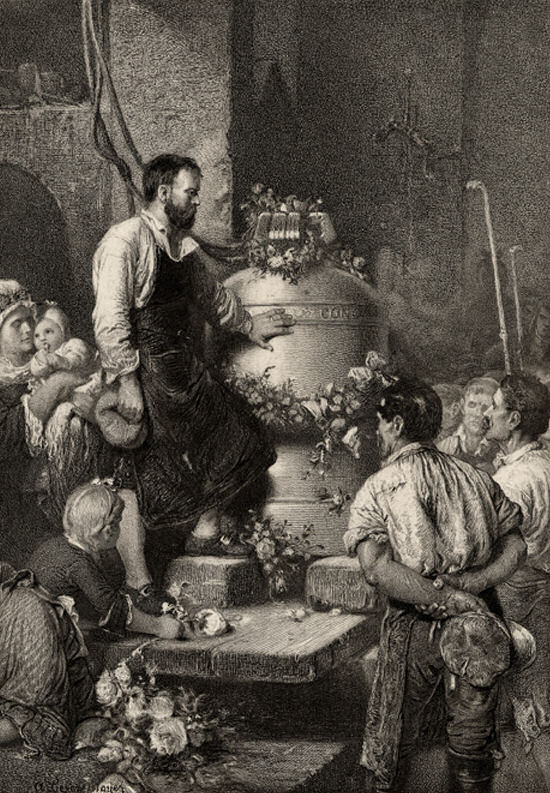
"Concordia Shall be thy Name"

Theodor Stroefer (or Ströfer; 27 March 1843 – 9 July 1927) was a German publisher, specializing in illustrated books.

== Biography ==
He learned the profession of publisher by working at Bruckmann Verlag in Munich. Then he was sent to New York City in 1866 to set up a commercial agency on Broadway. There, he imported and exported pictures, creating illustrated books and albums from engravings and photographs. In 1871 he teamed up with Georg Kirchner, who had emigrated from Frankfurt an der Oder; starting a publishing firm called "Stroefer & Kirchner".

In 1876, he returned to Germany and opened a branch office in Munich. One of his first projects was a new edition of Viola Tricolor, a collection of art and poetry by Franz Graf von Pocci. The following year, their company split into two divisions, with Stroefer operating "Theo. Stroefer's Kunstverlag", dealing exclusively with Europe, and Kirchner operating "Geo. Kirchner & Co.", for North America.

In 1893, he relocated his company's headquarters to Nuremberg and began a close collaboration with the Kunstanstalt für graphische Reproductionen, owned by Ernest Nister, creator of the modern pop-up book.

After his death, his son August (1882-1945), took over the company. During World War II, their offices and publishing archives were completely destroyed. In 1958, the company was officially deleted from the German Handelsregister.

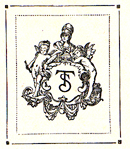
Company logo

=== Theo. Stroefer's Kunstverlag ===
His interests were wide-ranging. Some of his best known publications from the early period (1876-1890) included the first part of Faust by Goethe (1876), and Das Lied von der Glocke by Schiller, both with drawings by Alexander von Liezen-Mayer and ornamentation by Rudolf von Seitz. He also issued Wilhelm Tell with "photographic prints" and woodcuts by Friedrich Schwörer (1879).

A large part of his output consisted of children's picture books, often with illustrations chosen by Nister. The year 1880 saw the introduction of works by Kate Greenaway, including her now-classic Under the Window, translated by Käthe Freiligrath-Kroeker, daughter of the poet, Ferdinand Freiligrath. By the 1900s, he had effectively become a children's book publisher. One of his most popular authors was Ottilie Schwahn.

He was also the first to publish etchings by Max Klinger, issuing Intermezzi (Opus IV) in 1881.

As a sideline, he published postcards, with images provided by Nathaniel Sichel, Raphael Kirchner, Alexander Kircher and Carl Robert Arthur Thiele, among others
