= Gebhard Fugel =

German painter

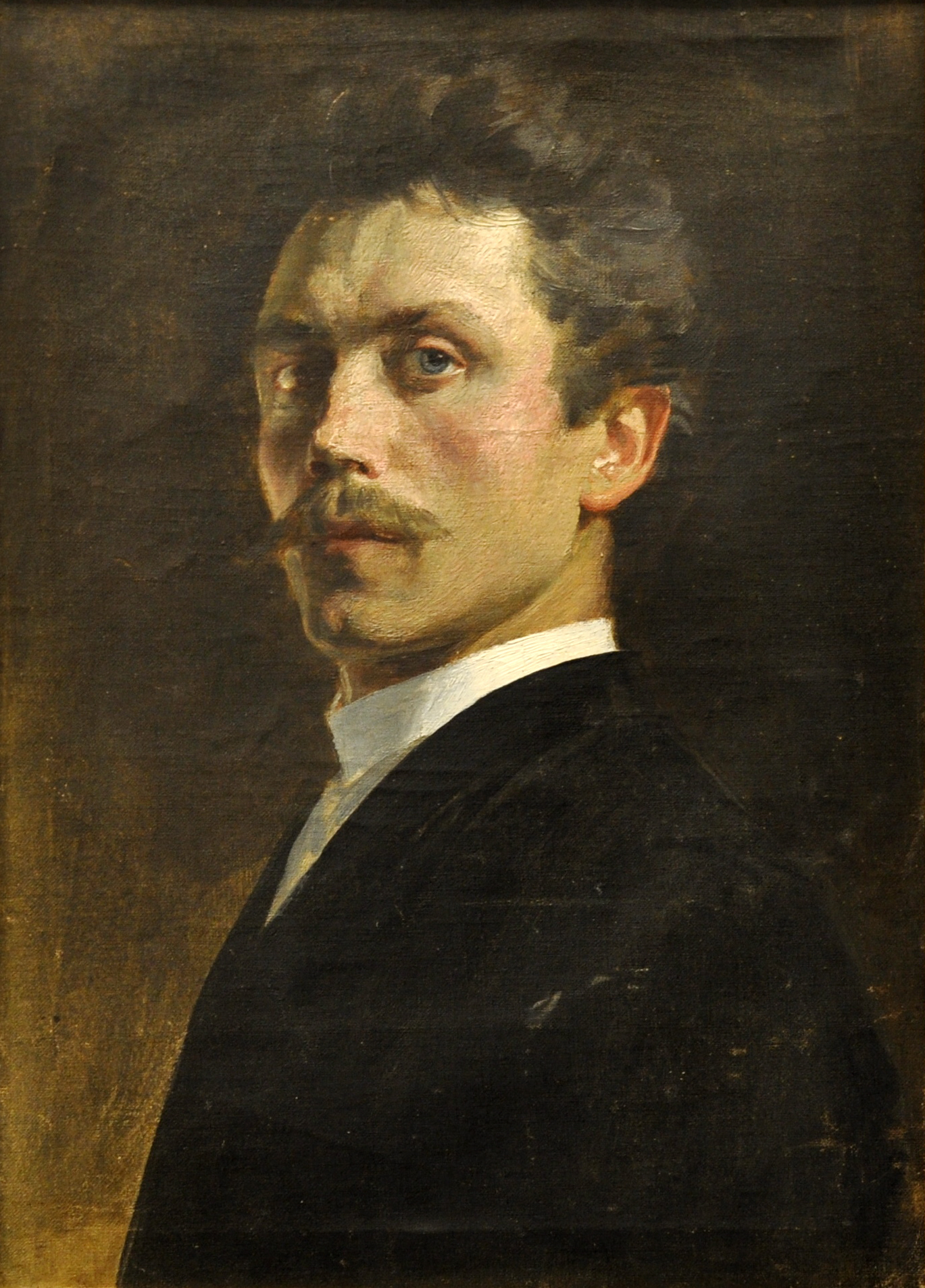
- Self-portrait, c. 1890
- Born: 14 August 1863; Oberklöcken near Ravensburg
- Died: 26 February 1939 (aged 75); Munich
- Education: Kunstschule Stuttgart
- Occupation: Painter

Gebhard Fugel (14 August 1863 – 26 February 1939) was a German painter specializing in Christian themes. He is best known for his work as the leading artist of the Crucifixion Panorama in Altötting.

== Life and work ==
Fugel was born in Oberklöcken near Ravensburg, and grew up in Upper Swabia. In Ravensburg, he was an apprentice of Theodor Schnell and Burkhard Edinger. From 1879 to 1885, he studied at the Kunstschule in Stuttgart with Alexander von Liezen-Mayer and Claudius Schraudolph the Younger, among others. While still a student, he began to focus on Christian motifs inspired by the works of the Nazarene movement. In 1885, his painting Christ Healing the Sick received favorable notice in an exhibition at the Kunstverein München. This enabled him to exhibit more widely.

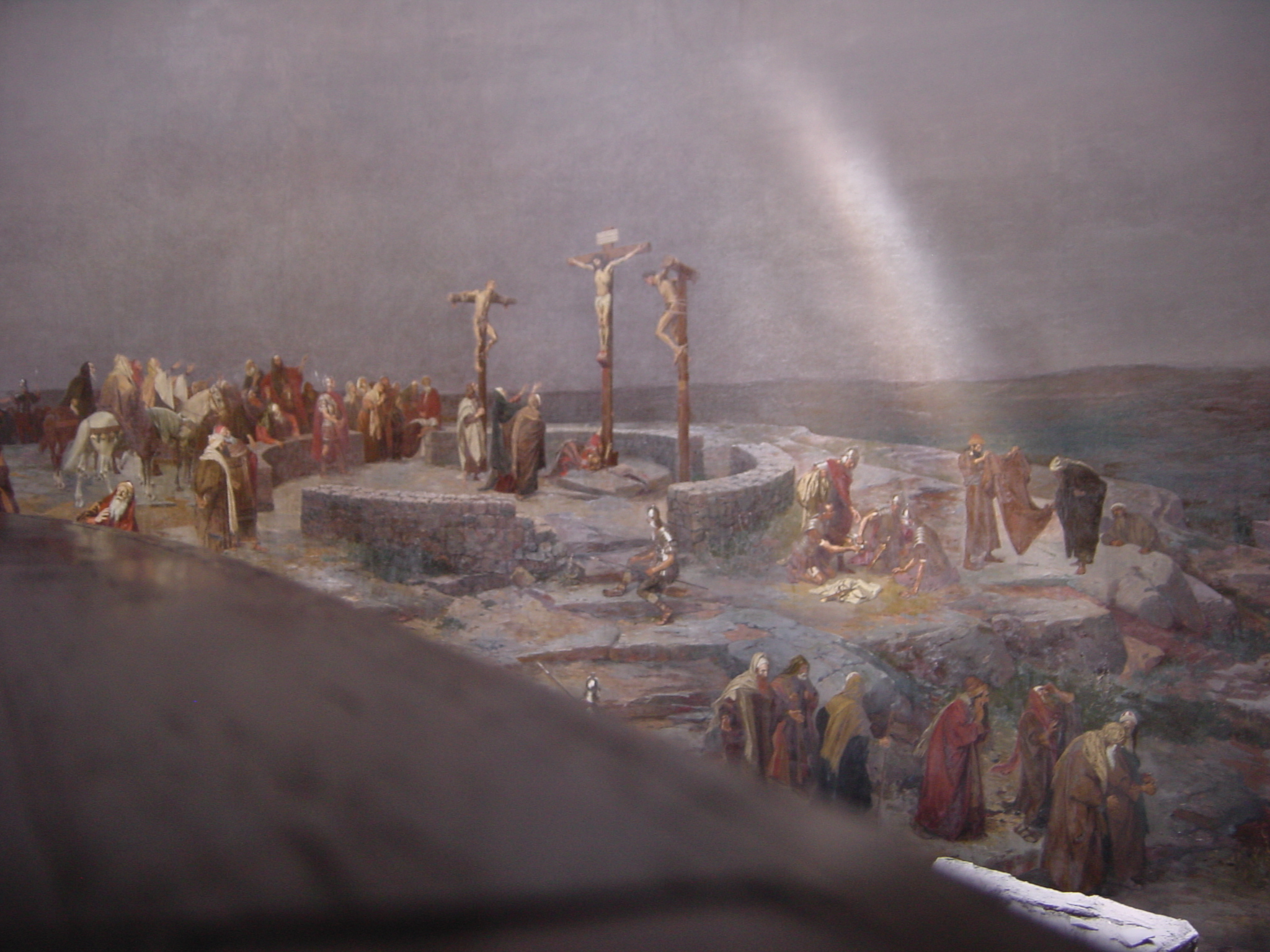
Detail from the Crucifixion Panorama in Altötting

In 1890, he moved to Munich permanently and participated in founding of the German Society for Christian Art (DGCK). He soon focused on altarpieces and large-format church murals. He created a panorama of the Crucifixion of Christ for Kevelaer, a pilgrimage destination at the Lower Rhine, in 1895. He created a Panorama of Bethlehem in 1901, which was presented in Zürich, Switzerland. Both works are lost. In 1902/03, he was the leading artist of the team creating the Crucifixion Panorama, a mural of 1140 square meter (12,270 square feet) of the Passion of Jesus for a specially-built exhibition building in Altötting. It is one of the last surviving panoramas and is unusual for portraying a religious subject, rather than the customary historical scenes, usually battles. Fugel and the architect financed the project. The Panorama is a listed historic monument of Bavaria and the UNESCO.

In 1905, he was named a royal professor. He created 136 religiously-themed Schulwandbilder, large format pictures displayed in classrooms for educational purposes. Many were also used as illustrations for school texts and various other books. Fugel died in Munich.

Streets have been named after him in Ravensburg, Weingarten, Friedrichshafen, Altötting and Munich. The Gebhard-Fugel-Kunstpreis was established by his grandson, Gebhard Streicher, in 1979 and is awarded every three years by the DGCK.

== Paintings ==
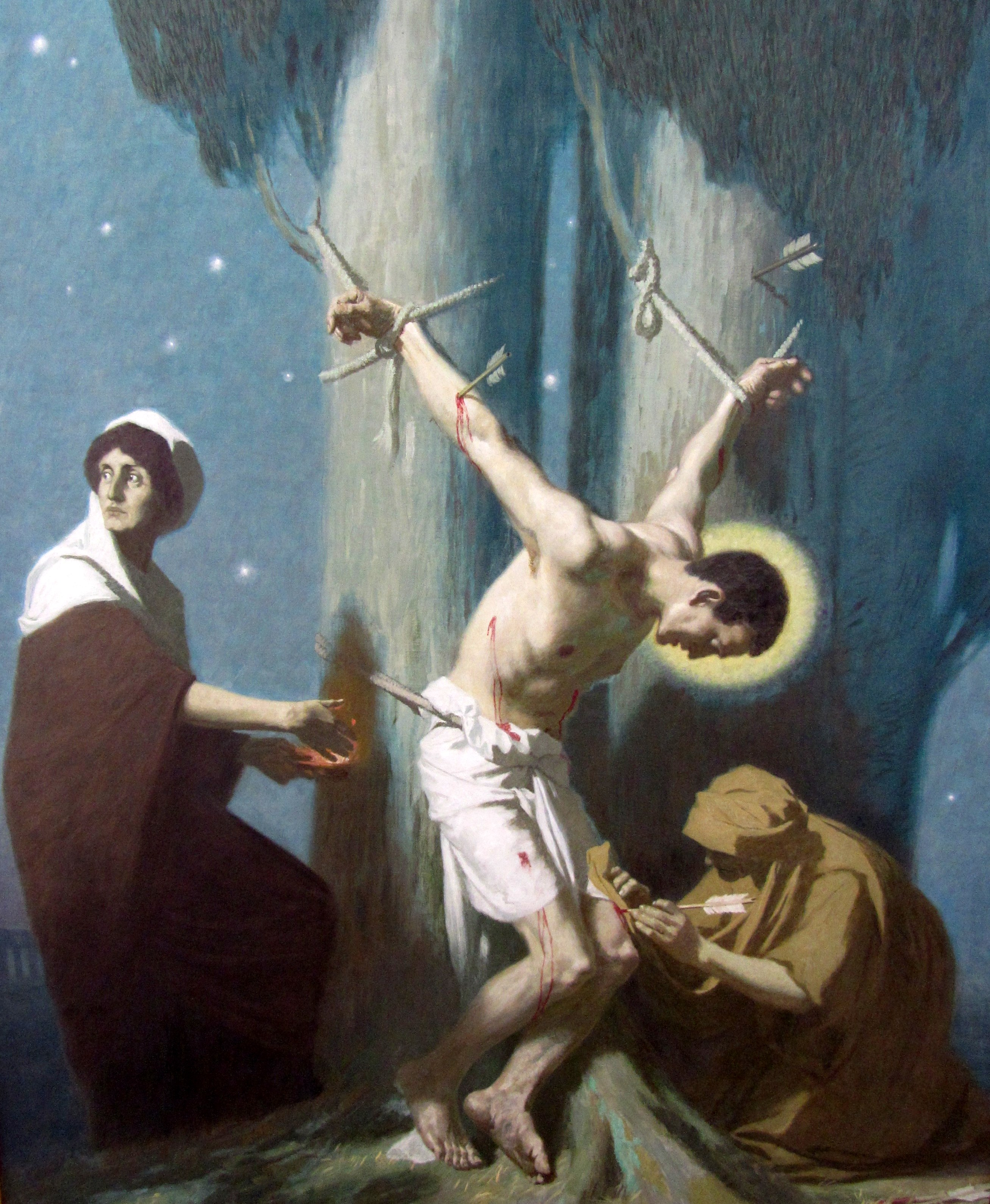
Saint Sebastian

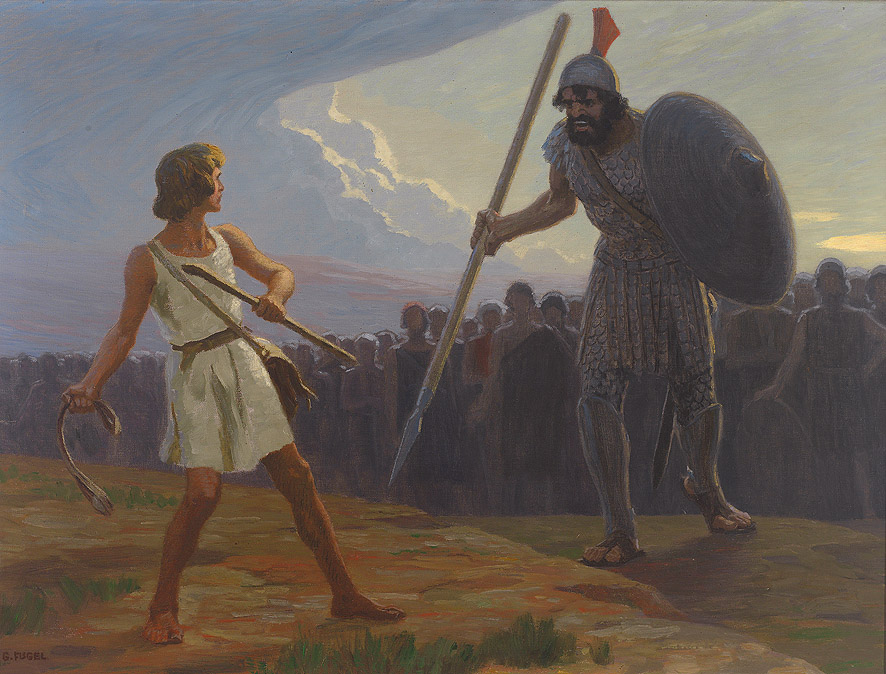
David and Goliath

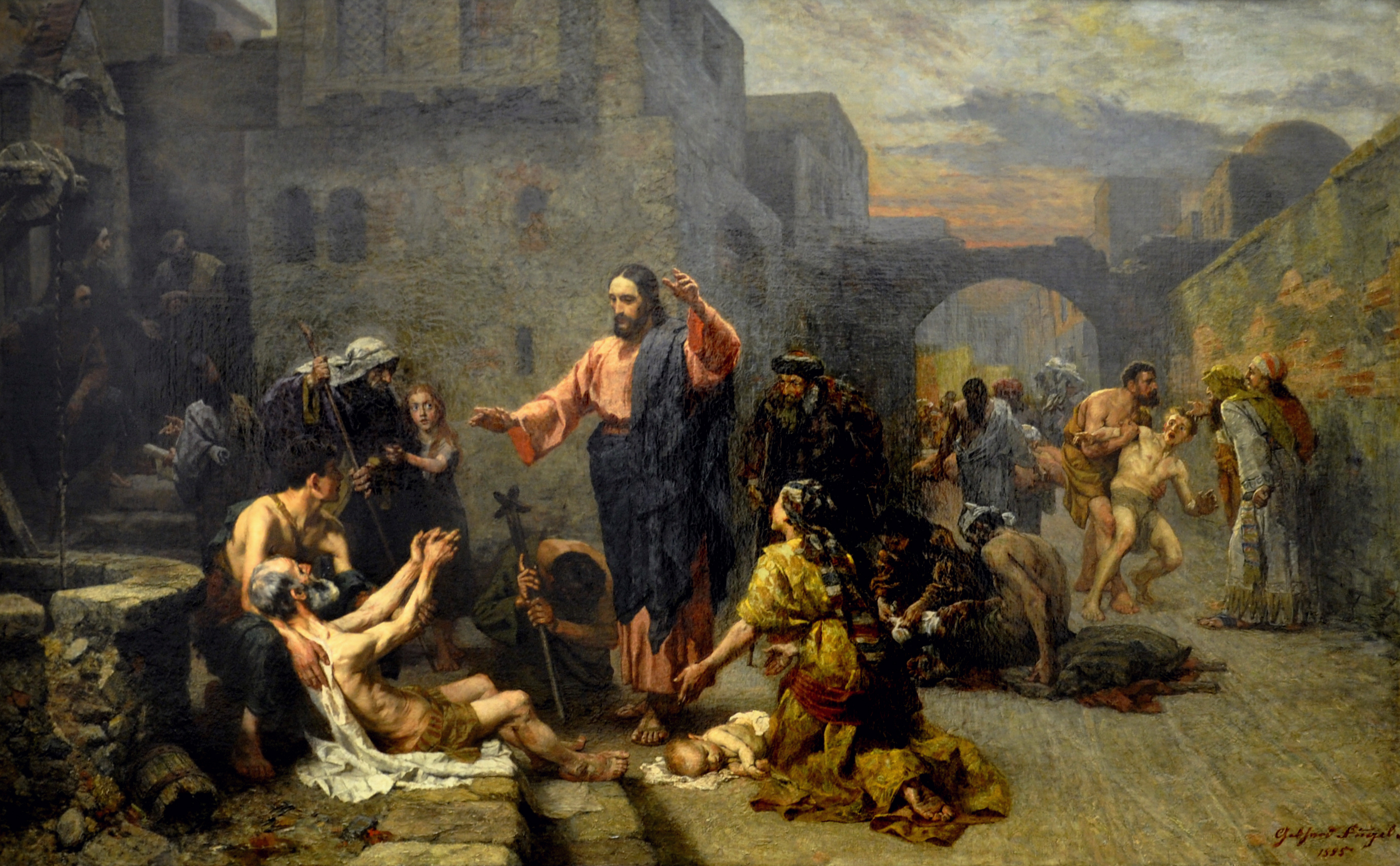
Christ Healing the Sick (1885 version)

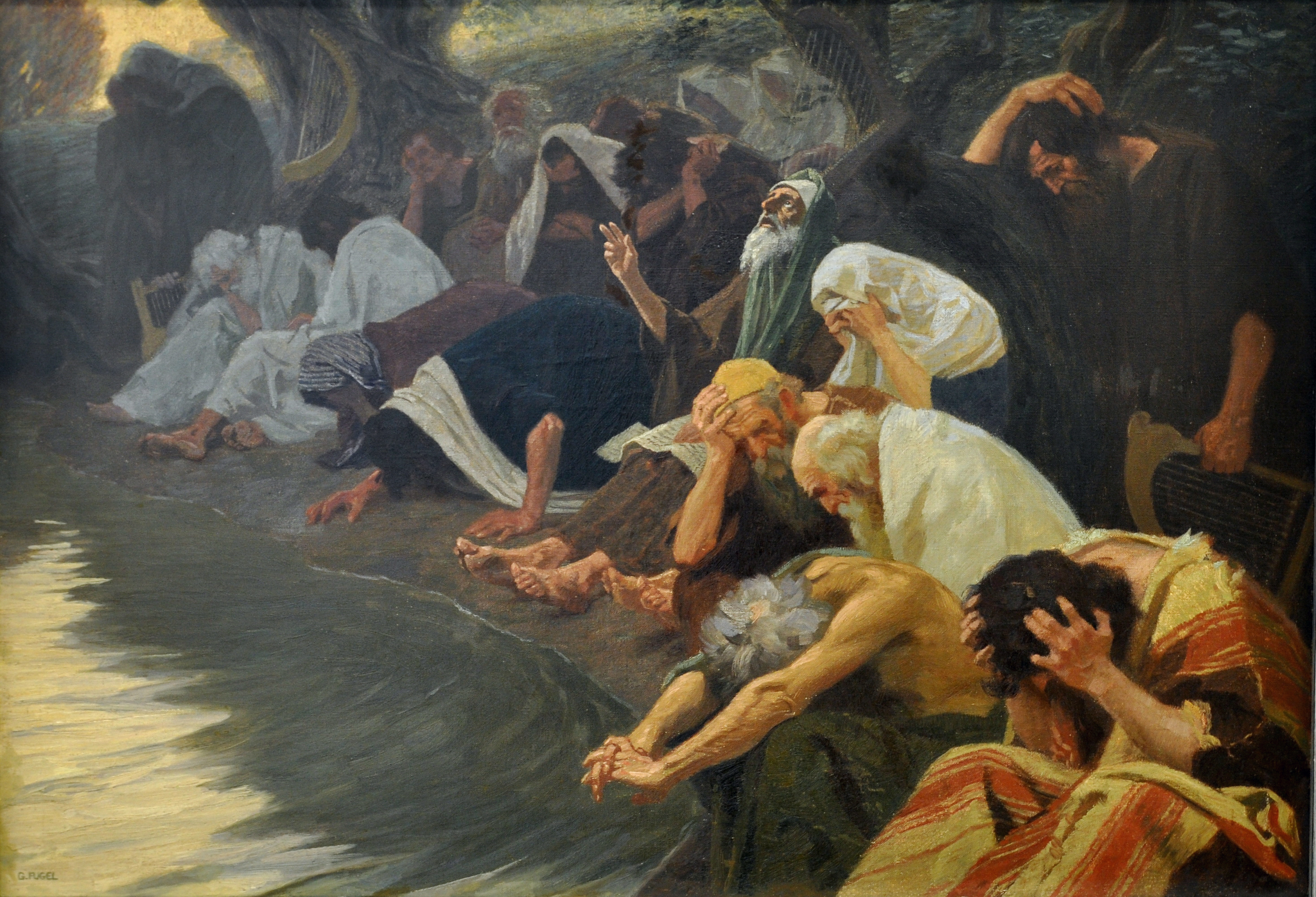
By the Waters of Babylon

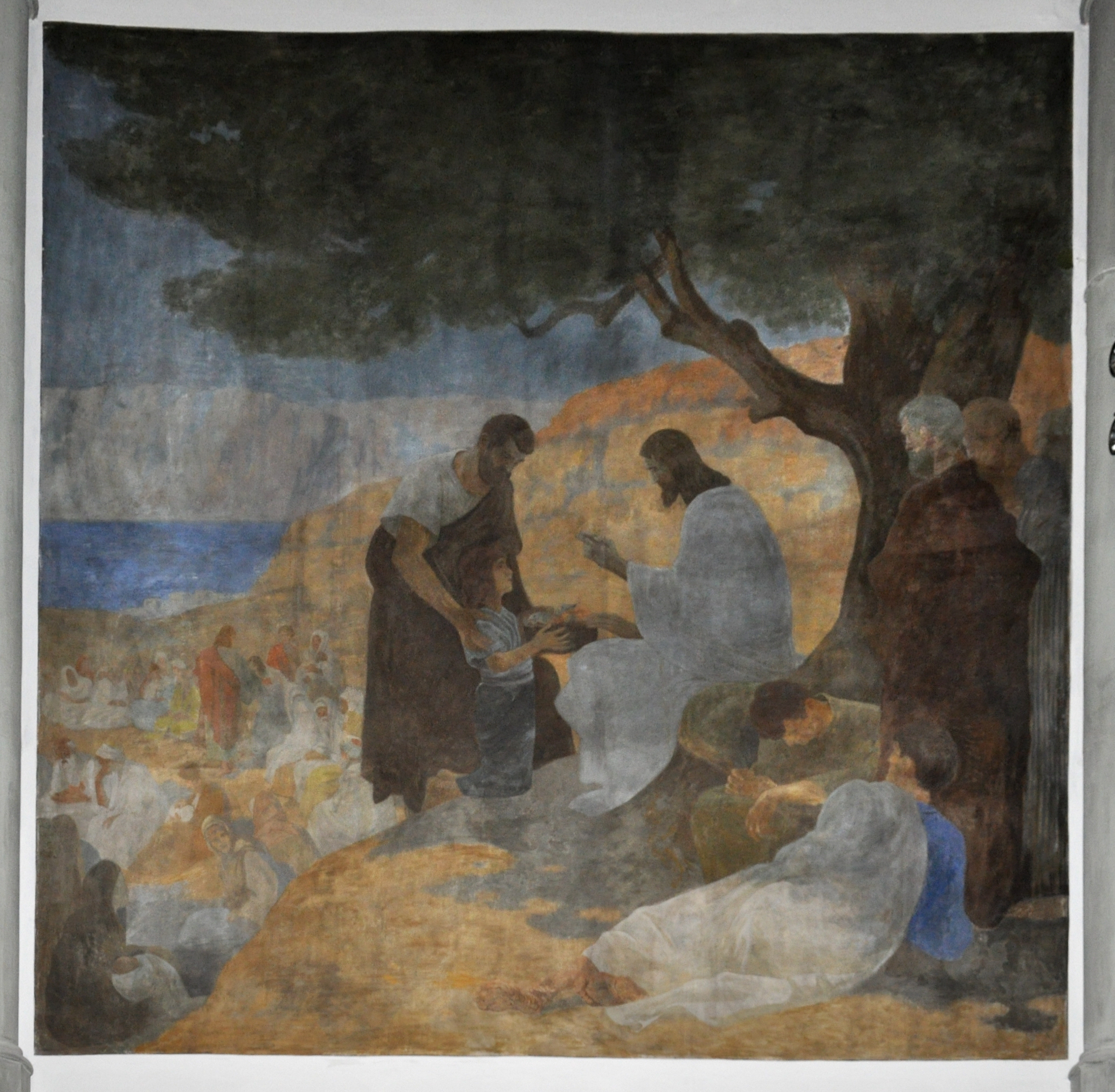
Ravensburg, Liebfrauenkirche, Miracle of the Loaves and Fishes, 1909

== Sources ==
- Ludwig Baur: "Der Kreuzweg von Gebhard Fugel". In: Archiv für christliche Kunst. 28. Jg. 1910, pgs.4–8 (Online)
- Ludwig Baur: "Die Fugelschen Fresken in der kath. Stadtpfarrkirche zu Ravensburg". In: Archiv für christliche Kunst. 28. Jg. 1910, pgs. 65–66, 73–76, 81–82 and 92–95 (Online)
- Oskar Döring-Dachau: "Gebhard Fugel" In: Die christliche Kunst, 6. Jg. 1909–1910, pgs. 133–143 (Online)
- Bernd Feiler: "Der Blaue Reiter und der Erzbischof. Religiöse Tendenzen, christlicher Glaube und kirchliches Bekenntnis in der Malerei Münchens von 1911 bis 1925". Dissertation, Ludwig-Maximilians-Universität München, 2002 (Online)
- Karl Muth: "Von christlicher Malerei und ihren Schöpfern". In: Hochland – Monatsschrift für alle Gebiete des Wissens, der Literatur und Kunst. Kösel, Kempten and Munich, 4. Jg. 1906–1907, Vol. I, pgs.60–66 (Online)
