= Ferdinand Büchner =

German flautist and composer

Ferdinand Büchner (born December 13, 1823, in Bad Pyrmont, Germany; d. 1906 in Moscow) was a German flautist and composer.

Ferdinand Büchner began studying the flute at an early age with his father, who played a leading role in the musical life of Bad Pyrmont. He was later taught by the flutist Christian Heinemeyer. He traveled to London, where he had his first public engagement at the age of 13. In 1847 he received an engagement in Berlin, where he remained for three years. In 1850 he traveled to Russia, and was intensely involved in the musical life of St. Petersburg. In 1856 he was appointed principal flute of the Bolshoi Theatre in Moscow. He retained the position until shortly before his death. His excellent reputation as a soloist and teacher brought him an appointment as professor at the Moscow Conservatory of Nikolai Rubinstein.

Büchner was a virtuoso musician and a composer. He wrote many pieces for the flute, including eight concertos. His finest concerto is considered to be the one in F minor, Op. 38, dedicated to his publisher, Julius Heinrich Zimmermann.

== List of compositions ==
- Flute Concertino, Op. 40
- Flute Concerto No. 1, Op. 38
- Flute Concerto No. 4, Op. 51
- Flute Concerto No. 8, Op. 64

== Sources ==
- Biographies for the Collection of Great Portraits: Flute Virtuoso and Composer Delettanten. Berlin, 1906.
- Ernst Stöhr. Music History of Germans from Russia. Laumann-Verlag, 1993. p. 69
- Hugo Riemann, music encyclopedia, Berlin, 1929.
