= Richard Throll =

German painter and designer

Richard Throll (18 January 1880 – 12 March 1961) was a German painter and designer. The focus of his work was the design of interiors for which he also made furniture and works of art.

== Life ==
Born in Munich, Throll studied from 1901 at the Academy of Fine Arts, Munich with Rudolf von Seitz. In 1905, he designed a villa at Leonrodstraße 4 ½ in Traunstein, which is still preserved in its original state. From 1905 to 1911, he was a teacher at the Berchtesgadener Fachschule and then professor at the Hochschule für Gestaltung Offenbach am Main. In 1912, he designed the rooms of the Budenheim Protestant parish, which were restored to their original state in 2008. In 1919, he painted the Offenbach Synagogue and also executed the stained glass windows and the Torah shrine. He also designed wine labels for the "Graphische Anstalt Wilhelm Gerstung" in Offenbach.

Throll died in Munich at the age of 81.
