= Detlef Zühlke =

German engineer and professor (born 1949)

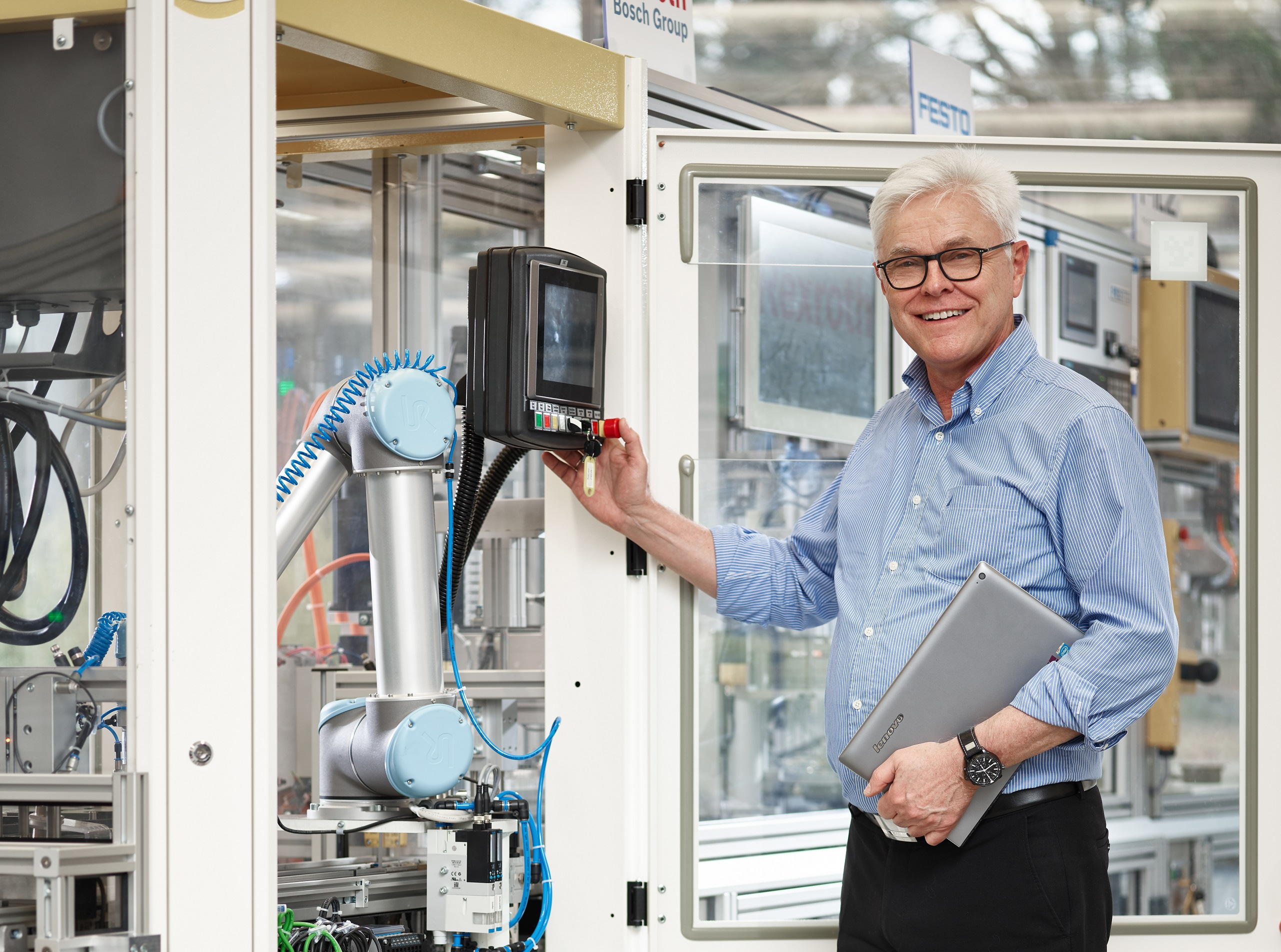
- Zühlke in 2017
- Born: 1949 (age 76–77); Bad Pyrmont
- Education: RWTH Aachen

Detlef Zuehlke (born 1949 in Bad Pyrmont) is a German engineer and professor.

== Career ==
Zühlke studied Electrical and computer engineering at the technical university RWTH Aachen. In 1983, he obtained his PhD in mechanical engineering (robot programming) at the Machine Tools Laboratory (WZL) at Aachen's university. From 1985 to 1991, he worked for German Lufthansa AG, where he held several management positions such as head of the aircraft maintenance department.

From 1991 to March 31, 2017, Zühlke held the chair for Production Automation (pak) at the Technical University Kaiserslautern. There, he founded the Center for Human-Machine-Interaction (ZMMI) in 1998 which provides research and services in the area of the design of human-machine-systems for industrial applications.

From 2009 to May 31, 2017, he was Director of the Research Department “ Innovative Factory Systems” at the German Research Centre for Artificial Intelligence (DFKI) GmbH.

Zühlke is the main initiator of the Technologie-Initiative SmartFactory KL e.V. founded in 2005 as a non-profit association. It is an Industrie 4.0 network of industrial and research partners who jointly carry out projects regarding the factory of the future. SmartFactory^{KL} is a manufacturer-independent demonstration and research platform. Here, innovative information and communications technologies and their application are tested and developed in a realistic, industrial production environment. The technology, supported by the participation of its members, has established pragmatic solutions, first products, and common standards. Since 2014, the production plant is annually exhibited at the trade show Hannover Messe in Germany.

In May 2019 Zühlke handed the Smartfactory-KL Chair to Martin Ruskowski. Thereafter, he organized and founded together with Smartfactory-KL / Germany, Brainport Industries / Netherlands und Flanders Make / Belgium the European umbrella organization SmartFactory-EU EWIV located in Kaiserslautern. Since then he became the executive Director. This association offers a platform for all European operators of research and demonstration facilities for smart manufacturing technologies in order to strengthen their cooperation and information.

Zühlkes main research topic has been the transfer of the "Internet of Things" into the future factory environment to create the "Factory of Things".

== Appointments ==
- 1998: Chair of Production Systems at Ruhr University Bochum (declined).
- 2002: Leader of the Fraunhofer Institute for Information and Data Processing IITB in Karlsruhe in conjunction with a professorship for Interactive Realtime Systems at the University of Karlsruhe (declined).

== Awards ==
- 1983: Borchers Medal of the RWTH Aachen for an outstanding performance in his PhD thesis.
- 2005: Association of German Engineers (VDI) – Medal of Honour for his merits in VDI/VDE-Society Measurement and Automatic Control (GMA).
- 2011: IFAC Outstanding Service Award.
- 2013: For his outstanding scientific work in the field of industrial automation, he was awarded with a doctor honoris causa by the Hermann-Oberth-Faculty of the Lucian Blaga University of Sibiu (ULBS).
- 2016: Prof. Zühlke among Smart Industry's TOP 50 Innovators of Digital Transformation.
- 2016: Zühlke among the 30 Advanced Manufacturing Visionaries recognized by SME in its Smart Manufacturing magazine.
- 2017: Manufacturing Leadership (ML) Awards – Frost & Sullivan's Manufacturing Leadership Council honors him as Manufacturing Leader of the Year for his pioneer work in the field of Industrie 4.0.
- 2017: Order of Merit Award of the Federal State of Rhineland-Palatinate.

== Honorary positions ==
- Chairman of the IFAC CC 4 on Mechatronics, Robotics and Components and member of the IFAC Technical Board.
- 2002 - 2008: Chairman of the International Federation of Automatic Control - IFAC TC 4.5 on Human-Machine-Systems.
- 2005 - 2019: Chairman of the executive board of Technology Initiative SmartFactory KL e.V.; since 2019: Honorary member of the executive board of SmartFactory-KL
- Chairman of the VDI/VDE-GMA Focusproject "Ambient Intelligence in Automation".
- Scientific coordinator of the USEWARE congress series.
- Member of the board of governors of the Manufacturing Leadership Council.
- Member of the Industry 4.0 scientific advisory board hosted by acatech (German national academy of science and engineering).

== Selected works ==
- Useware-Engineering für technische Systeme, Springer Verlag, 2004.
- Der intelligente Versager - Das Mensch-Technik-Dilemma, Primus Verlag, 2005.
- SmartFactoryKL – A Vision becomes Reality. Keynote Paper Moscow, 13th IFAC Symposium on Information Control Problems in Manufacturing, 2009.
- SmartFactory — Towards a factory-of-things, IFAC Annual Reviews in Control, Volume 34, 2010.
- Model-Driven Development of Advanced User Interfaces, Springer Verlag, 2011.
- Industrie 4.0 Handbook (chapters) edt. By Gunter Reinhart, Hanser Verlag, 2017.
