= Thomas Webel =

German politician (born 1954)

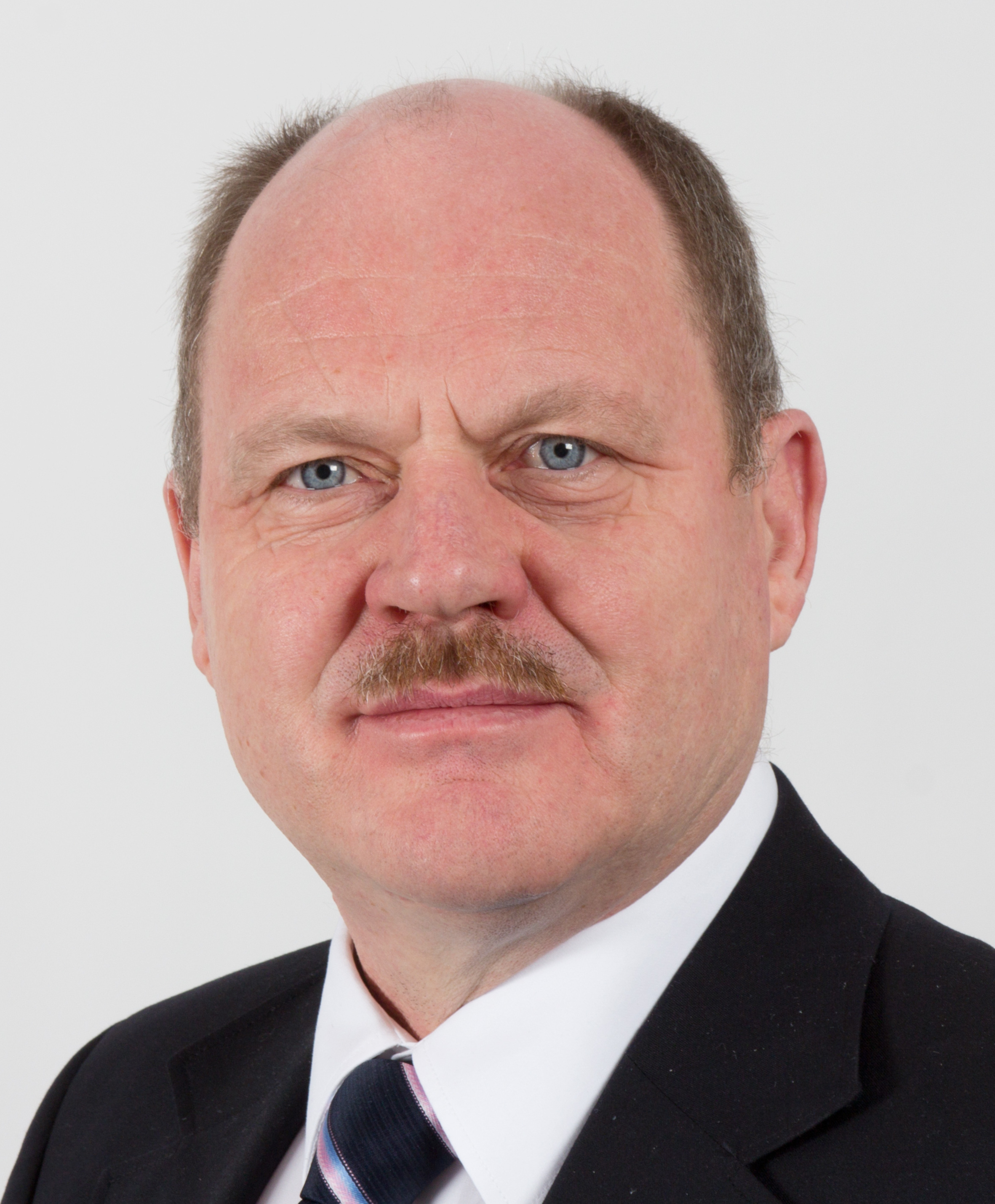
- Webel in 2012

Minister of Regional Development and Transport of Saxony-Anhalt
- Incumbent
- Assumed office 19 April 2011
- Prime Minister: Reiner Haseloff
- Preceded by: Karl-Heinz Daehre

Chairman of the Christian Democratic Union in Saxony-Anhalt
- In office 13 November 2004 – 17 November 2018
- Preceded by: Wolfgang Böhmer
- Succeeded by: Holger Stahlknecht

Personal details
- Born: 27 July 1954 (age 71) Bad Pyrmont, West Germany
- Party: Christian Democratic Union

Thomas Webel (born 27 July 1954) is a German politician of the Christian Democratic Union (CDU).

== Life and politics ==
Webel was born 1954 in Bad Pyrmont and became member of the CDU in 1990.

From 1990 to 2002 Webel was a member of the Landtag of Saxony-Anhalt, the legislative body of the German federal state of Saxony-Anhalt. Webel was chairman of the CDU in Saxony-Anhalt from 2004 to 2018.

Since 2011, Webel has been serving as State Ministry of Regional Development and Transport in the government of Minister-President Reiner Haseloff. As one of the state's representatives at the Bundesrat, he is a member of the Committee on Transport and of the Committee on Urban Development, Housing and Regional Planning. He is also a member of the German-Russian Friendship Group set up by the Bundesrat and the Russian Federation Council.

== Other activities ==
- Federal Network Agency for Electricity, Gas, Telecommunications, Posts and Railway (BNetzA), Member of the Rail Infrastructure Advisory Council
