= Franz von Seitz =

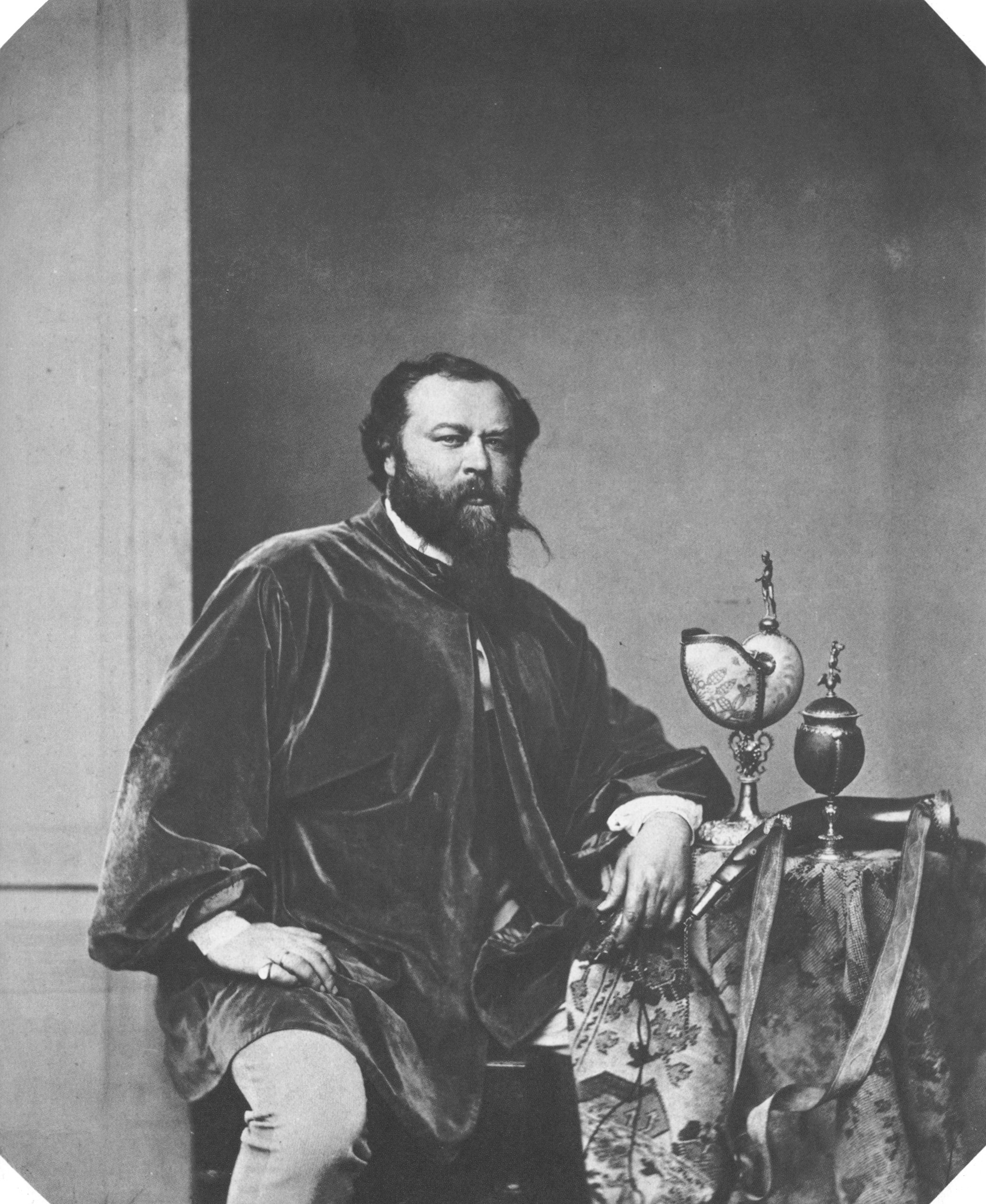
Franz Seitz, 1856

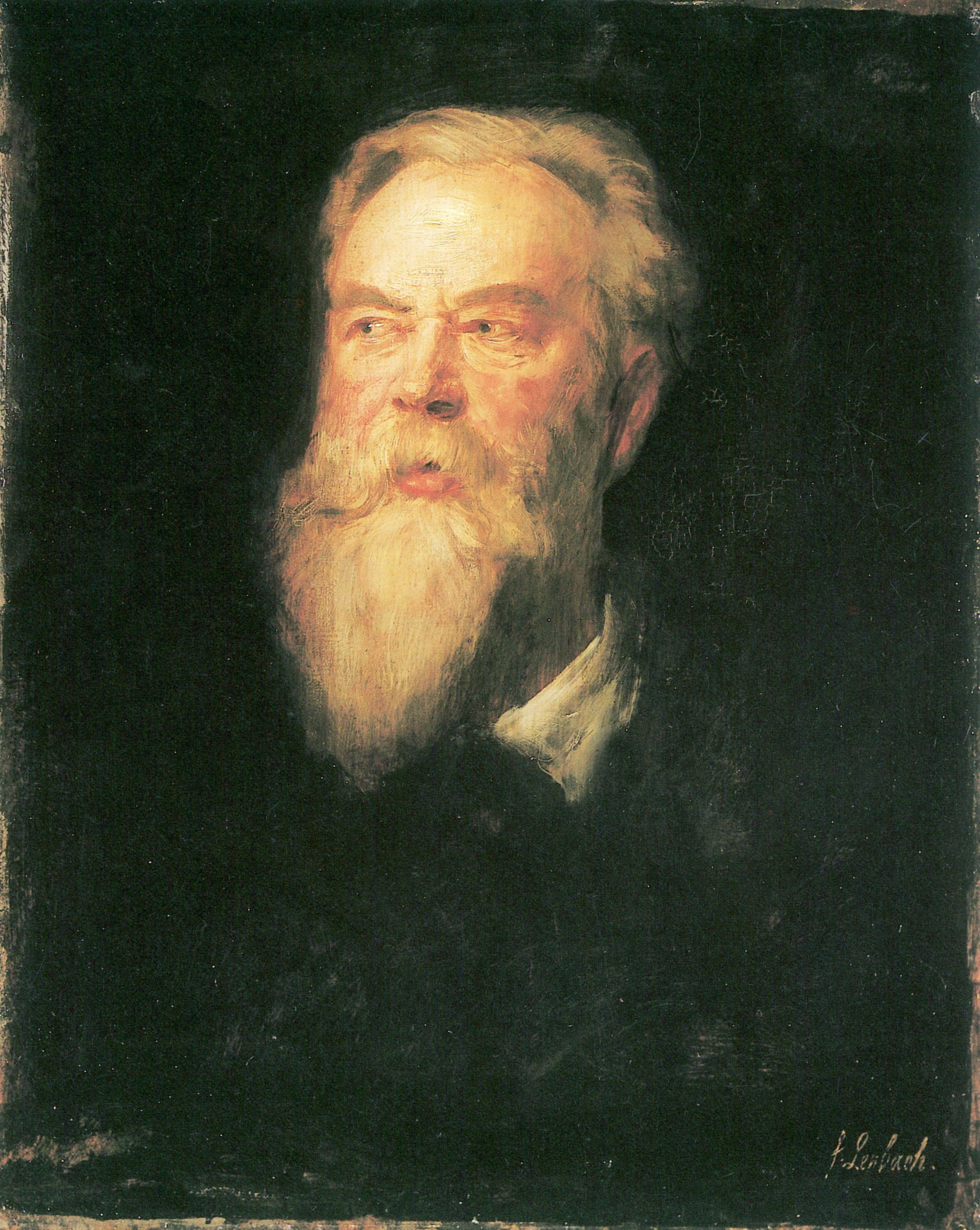
Portrait of Franz von Seitz by Franz von Lenbach, c. 1878

Franz von Seitz, born Franz Seitz (31 December 1817 – 13 April 1883) was a German painter, lithographer, engraver and costume designer as well as an art teacher and theatre director.

== Life ==
Seitz was a native of Munich, Bavaria, son of Johann Baptist Seitz. He studied at the Munich Academy of Art under Joseph Schlotthauer and afterwards worked independently as a lithographer and engraver. In 1848 he took over the artistic direction of the satirical newspaper Leuchtkugeln. From 1855 he was the costume director of the Munich Hoftheater. In 1858 he was appointed professor at the Academy of Art.

In 1869 he was made artistic director of the Court Theatre (Hofbühne) and director of scenery at the Residenz Theatre, Munich. In 1876 he retired and was made an honorary Member of the Academy of Art.

Franz von Seitz was buried in the Alter Südfriedhof in Munich.

== Works ==
Among much else, Franz made many designs, with his son Rudolf, for the decoration of Schloss Linderhof. They also decorated the inside of the Royal train of King Ludwig II of Bavaria, inspired by the Palace of Versailles.

== Sources ==
- Hyacinth Holland (1891). "Seitz, Franz von" . Allgemeine Deutsche Biographie (in German). Vol. 33. Leipzig: Duncker & Humblot. pp. 657–662.
