= Song of the Bell =

1798 poem by Friedrich Schiller

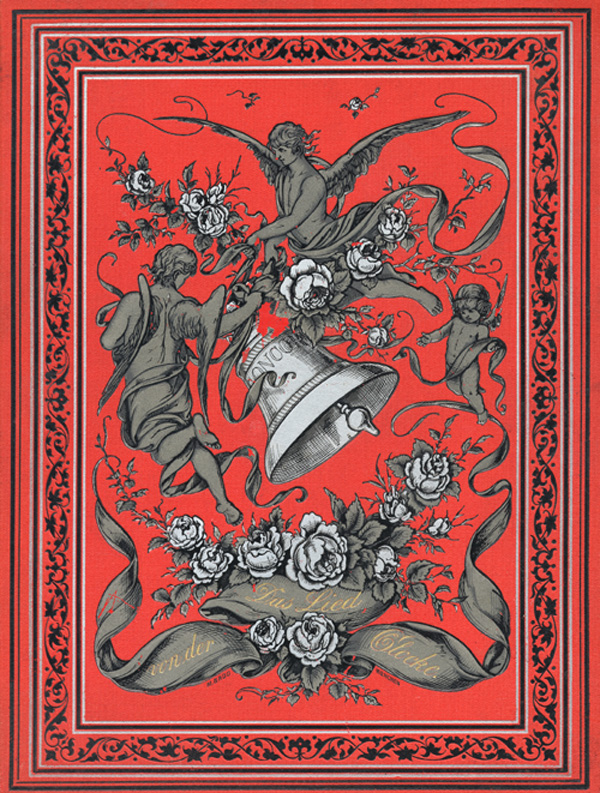
Cover by Alexander von Liezen-Mayer, published by Theo. Stroefer’s Kunstverlag

The "Song of the Bell" (German: "Das Lied von der Glocke", also translated as "The Lay of the Bell") is a poem that the German poet Friedrich Schiller published in 1798. It is one of the most famous poems of German literature and with 430 lines one of Schiller's longest. In it, Schiller combines a knowledgeable technical description of a bellfounding with points of view and comments on human life, its possibilities and risks.

== Origin ==
As a small boy Schiller came in contact with the trade of bellfounding because Georg Friderich Neubert, the son of the Ludwigsburg bellfounder, was a classmate at his Latin school and the Schiller family lived only a few doors away from the casting house. It is also considered to be certain that Schiller visited the Neubert family again during his stay in Ludwigsburg 1793/94. More than ten years passed between the first basic idea for the poem and its completion. During this time Schiller closely observed the sequence of operations in a bellfoundry. In the family of the Rudolstadt bellfounder Johann Mayer it was related from generation to generation, "how Schiller repeatedly visited the casting works and interrogated the casting master, who at first was not pleased about this disruption to the work, and how the pale scholar considerately took a seat at the wall in a high-backed chair in order not to disturb the work."

== Contents ==
=== Motto ===
The first indented line between the title and the first stanza is in Latin and reads "Vivos voco. Mortuos plango. Fulgura frango", approximately translating as "I call the living, I mourn the dead, I repel lightning."

=== Bell casting and the course of life ===
A look at the assembled form: The first stanza calls attention to the preliminary work which precedes the actual casting process. The clay form is in a banked pit ready to be filled with the molten metal. The molten wax method is described, in which a wax model of the bell is first made. Because in the course of the casting both the model and the form are destroyed the procedure is also known as the lost wax process.

Giving meaning to work: The first observation marks the actual beginning of the poem. Nobody who carries out any work should do it thoughtlessly, but must rather put his heart into it.

Preparing the alloy for casting: Schiller describes the wood fuel, the opening in the smelting furnace through which the flame sweeps over the metal, the door which permits the fire to be stirred up and when closed forces the flame into the furnace. One has to imagine the casting pit as being close to the furnace where the metal is stacked up. First the copper is introduced, and when that is liquefied the easier-to-melt tin is added.

Attesting to life’s milestones: The second observation describes the subject of the poem in more detail. The bell which is created in the depths of the pit will sing the praises of the casting master when it is later up in the belfry. It will outlast many generations, and accompany every transition in human life.

Melting the alloy: When the three parts copper and one part tin are melted, a white foam forms on the surface which captures any impurities. Its formation is facilitated by the addition of potash.

From baptism to first love: The third observation begins with describing childhood. Solemnly the bell greets the child who is to be baptized. His fate is however uncertain. His mother watches over his first years of life. Later the young man leaves his sweetheart behind and goes out into the world. When he returns she has become a blossoming young woman and he falls in love with her and experiences the transitory, "splendid moment of first love".

Inspecting the melt: At the furnace are windpipes or draft holes which can be opened or closed, as needed. After the metal has been in the furnace for 12 hours the pipes turn yellow indicating that it is time for casting. But first a test is made by dipping a little rod into the liquefied metal. If it looks as if it has been glazed, then it is assumed that the brittle copper has merged with the softer tin.

Wedding bell and allocation of roles: In the fourth observation the bell calls people to the wedding celebration which is the climax of the happy love affair, after which it makes place for family life. The stanza continues by describing a traditional family, with the man going out into a hostile world while at home the virtuous housewife prevails.

Starting the casting: First a short prayer is recited and then a small amount of metal is poured into a depression in a warm rock. When it has cooled it is broken apart and the size of the jagged teeth at the fractured surface reveals whether the melting process has come to an end or not. If they are too short, copper has to be added, if they are too long, tin. In order to guide the metal into the form, cone shaped pins are pushed in. The hole thus created lets the melt stream out, first into a curved trough and then into the bell form.

Fire alarm bell: the fifth observation is about how erratic happiness is. Beginning with the fire that causes the metals to melt, Schiller also describes its destructive power in a very dynamic series of descriptions: "roof beams collapse, pillars crash down, windows shatter, children wail, mothers dash around in panic… everyone runs, rescues, flees."

Filling the bell form: The form has been filled with the melt, now one has to wait to find out whether the work is well done. The master craftsman cannot yet rejoice because he does not know if the casting was successful.

Death knell upon the decease of the woman: Just as the master entrusts his cast to the earth, so the peasant entrusts his seedlings to the earth, and so the dead are put into the ground, so that they can rise from the dead in the hereafter. The bell now has an earnest purpose and tolls in accompaniment to a funeral. In Goethe’s Epilogue on Schiller’s Bell (Epilog zu Schillers Glocke) the motif of the death knell is picked up and applied to Schiller’s own death.

Cooling down the bell: After all the strenuous work, peace reigns while the metal cools. The workers enjoy a break while the master prepares for the next step.

A peaceful evening after the day's work: This stanza describes a peaceful autumn evening in a country town. A hiker returns home through the woods as herds of sheep and cows are driven to their stalls. A heavily loaded harvest wagon drives in through the gate; farmhands and maidservants head for the harvest dance. It slowly gets dark and the town gates are closed. The upright inhabitants have no fear of the dark and can (from the German) "sleep the sleep of the just" since the night watchman, "the eye of the law", is patrolling the streets. This is considered one of the early literary uses of the much translated phrase. But this sacred order can only last as long as peace reigns.

Destroying the bell casing: After cooling, the casing starts to separate from the baked clay, which is now smashed with a hammer. In a reference to the Resurrection, the poem asserts "If the bell is to rise from the ground / The form has to break apart."

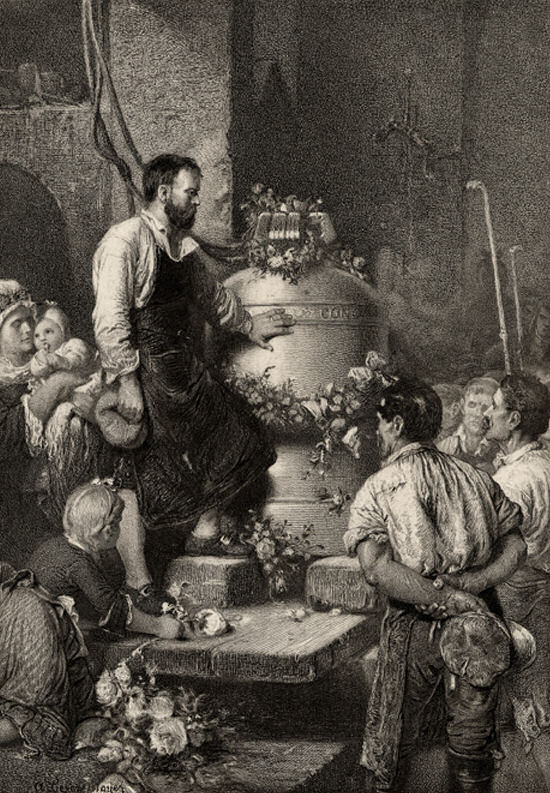
Concordia shall be the name. Illustration by Liezen-Mayer

Alarm bell and storm damage:

The master can break the form,
In time, and with a cautious hand
But beware if in a fiery flow
The glowing metal frees itself!

But sociable happiness does not rest on unshakeable pillars. Schiller takes as his theme the French Revolution of 1789 and criticizes the inhuman Jacobin excesses, "Where women turn into hyenas / And poke fun at horrors." Here Schiller presents a very pessimistic view of mankind.

The finished bell: Now the bell slowly comes to light and the viewers can admire the coats of arms on the outside.

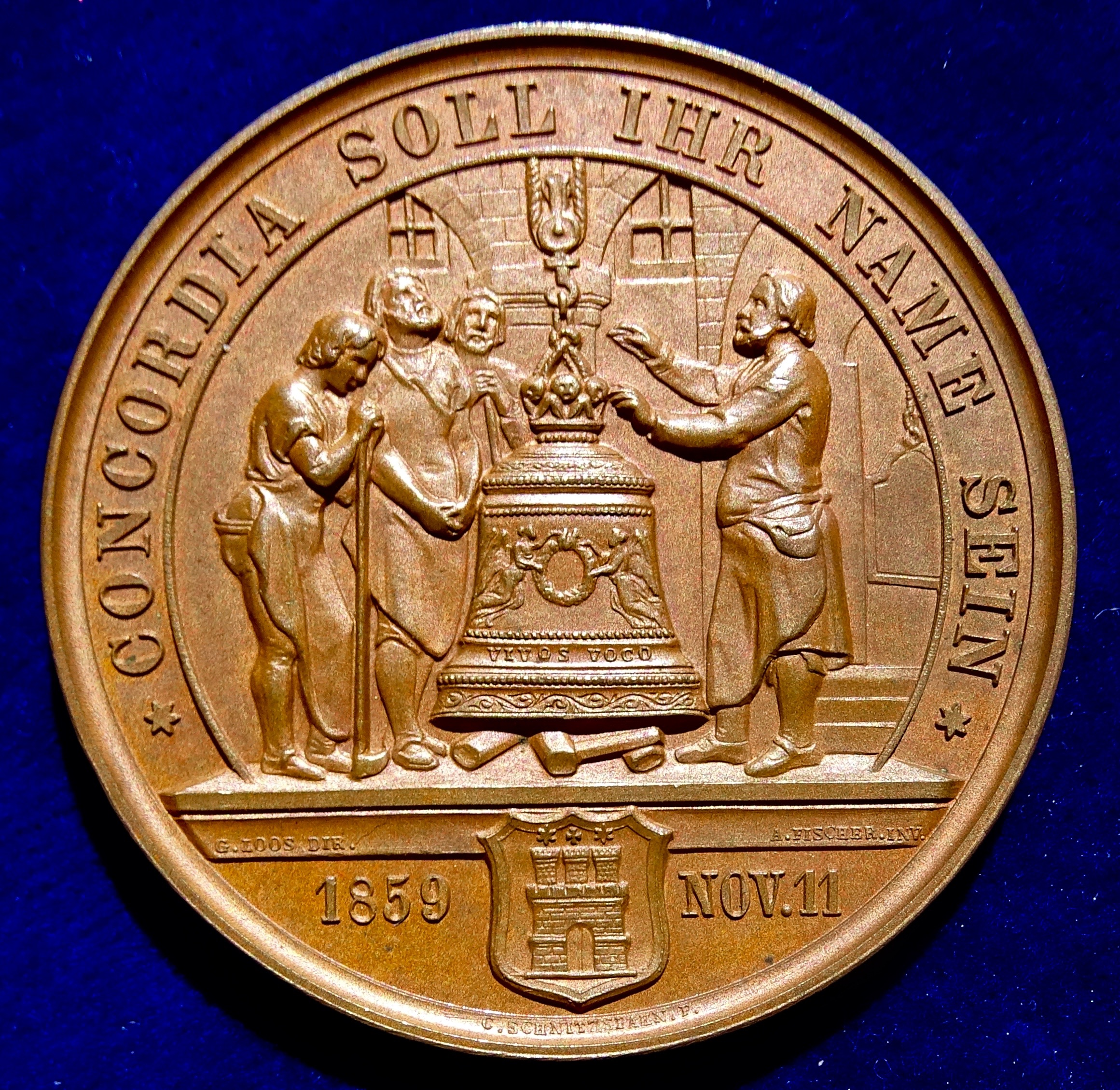
"The bell's christening" on a medal issued for the celebration of Schiller's 100th birthday in 1859

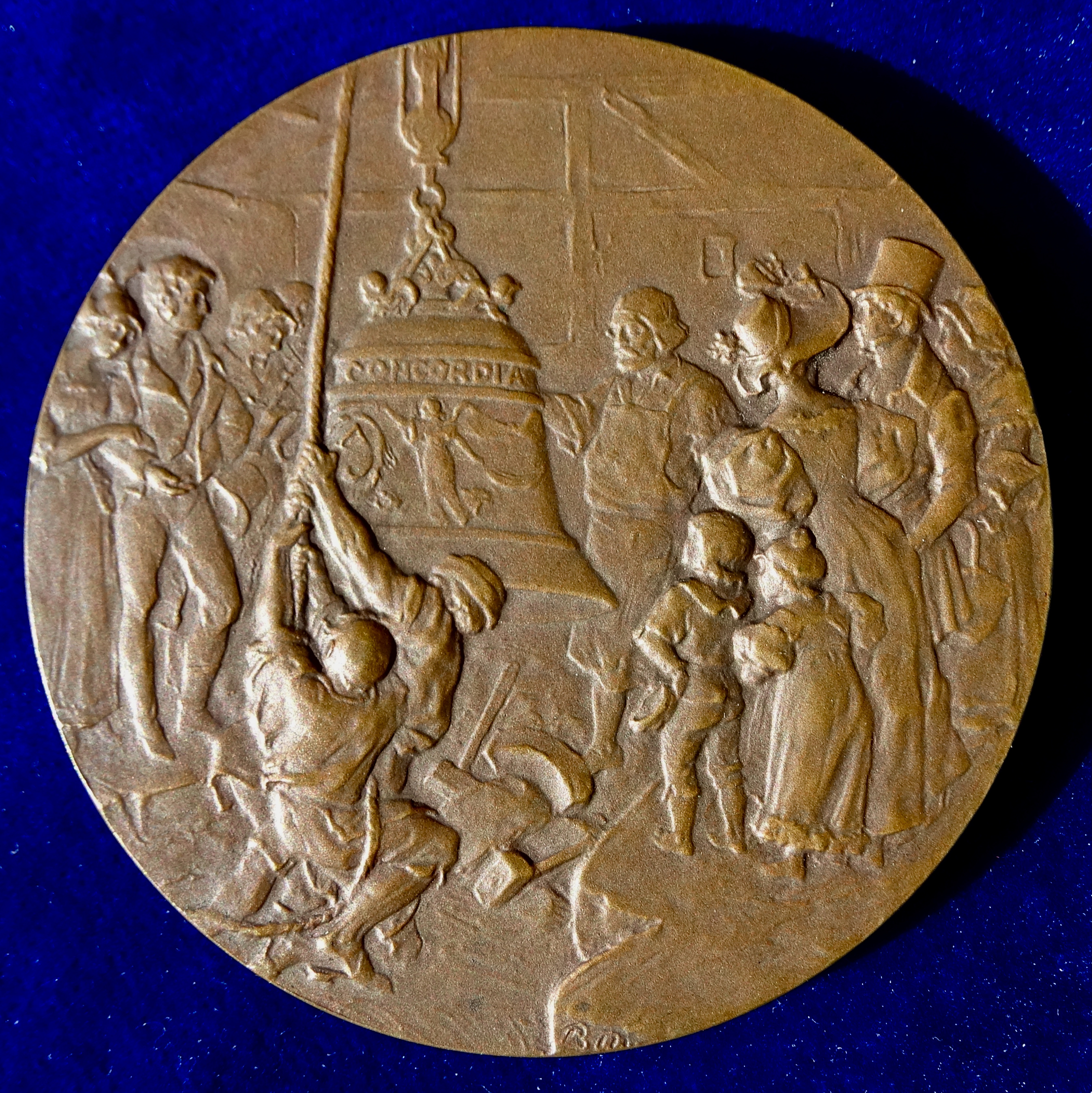
Contribution to the Schiller Year 1905 by Rudolf Mayer

Christening the bell: the master craftsman calls the workers together to christen the bell. Now it can be raised to the belfry in order to fill its destiny. He encourages his workmen, "pull, pull, lift! / It moves, it hangs." And the "Song of the Bell" concludes with the words,

Be a joy to this town
May the first tolling denote peace.

== Reception ==
First reactions to the "Song of the Bell" were without exception positive. Its success was attributed to each person's being able to find meaning in it. At a solemn meeting of the Royal Academy in Schiller Year 1859, Jacob Grimm praised "this incomparable poem, far superior to what other peoples can offer", and declared it to be a national symbol of unity). But despite great enthusiasm for Schiller's longest poem there was also considerable criticism. It was too emotional, too lofty, too garrulous; people criticized technical details, and over 100 parodies were written. Those of the 19th century were not critical of the original, which was greatly admired, but instead strived to make use of this very well known poem for their own ends. The late nineteenth century English author George Gissing encouraged his eighteen-year-old sister, Margaret, who was learning German at the time to read it in the original (as well as other works by Schiller). Gissing wrote in his letter that it was "one of the most glorious poems ever written, but a little difficult". Many Bell parodies shifted the observations about the production process to the production of food and drinks like bread, beer and coffee.

== Recitations and musical settings ==
Goethe wrote his epilogue to the "Song of the Bell" shortly after Schiller's death in order to have it read by the actress Amalie Becker at the conclusion of a memorial celebration in the Lauchstädt Theater. After the three last acts of Maria Stuart, the "Song of the Bell" was recited with distributed roles. Other performances of the Bell took place especially in schools in the 19th century. In Hamburg the Bell was portrayed by local people in so-called living pictures on the occasion of the Schiller Year 1859. Among the various music versions are Andreas Romberg: Das Lied von der Glocke, Op. 111 (Romberg was a colleague of Beethoven, who set to music Schiller's ode "An die Freude" ("Ode to Joy") and Max Bruch: Das Lied von der Glocke, Op. 45 (Bruch's work has been called a musical "Bible for the man in the street").

== As German cultural heritage ==
In the 19th century Schiller was read and honored not only by schoolteachers, but also by craftsmen and workers, as an initiator of national unity. Until about 1955 the Bell was an essential part of the Volksschule 8th. Klasse as well as high school curriculum and regarded as part of German cultural heritage. It was regarded as a treasury of sayings; well known collections list a large number of verses from the "Song of the Bell" which continue to be quoted today as part of the German cultural heritage, sometimes without awareness of the source.

== Translations ==
Schiller's "Song of the Bell" has been translated into many languages. Already in 1877 there were translations into French, Dutch, Norwegian, English, Italian, Latvian, Hungarian, Hebrew, Czech, Danish, Polish, Russian, Spanish, Swedish, Slovene, Sorbian, Romanian, etc., not counting all the translations into various German dialects.
