= Sándor Liezen-Mayer =

German painter

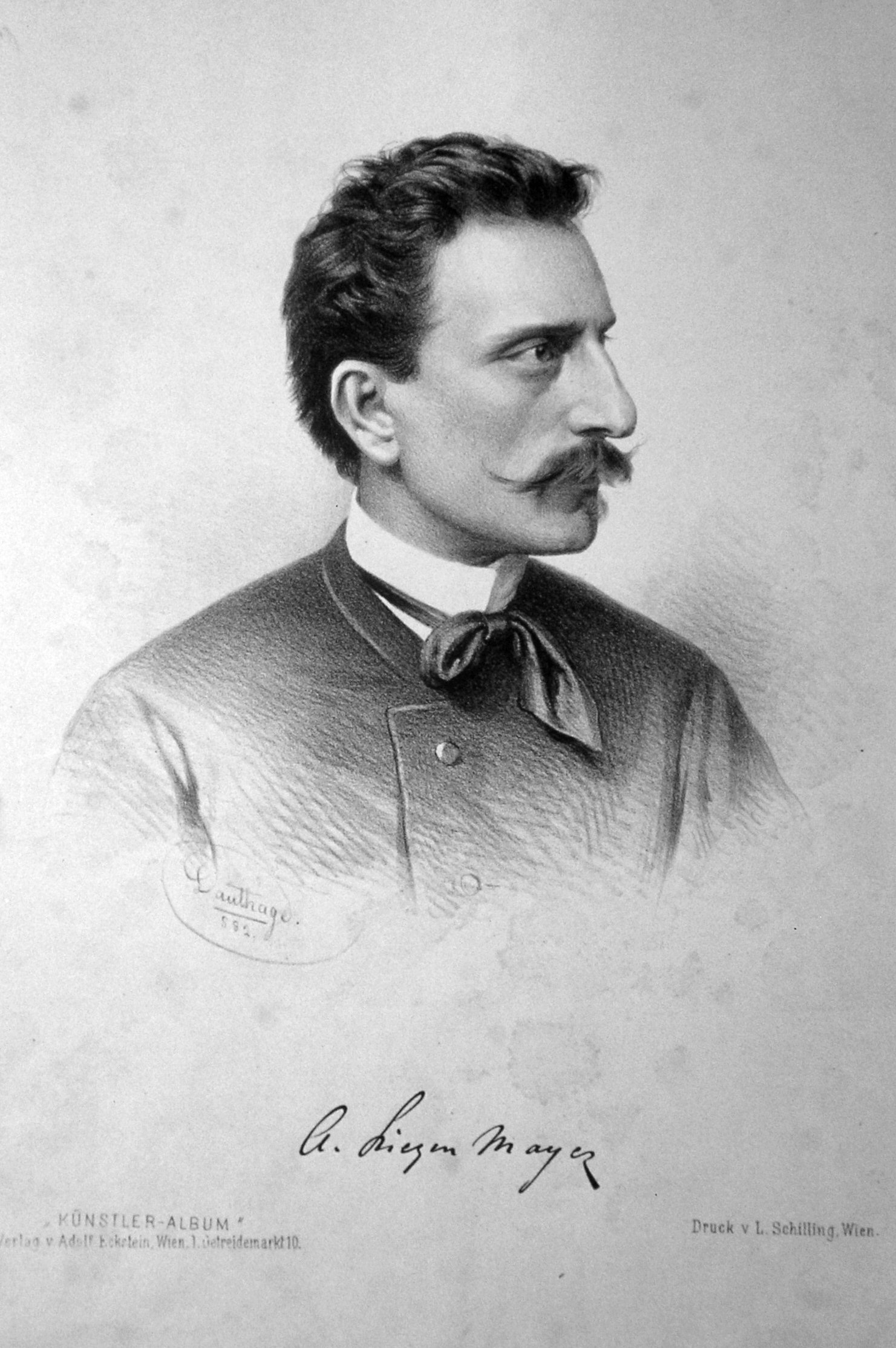
- Liezen-Mayer (1882); lithograph by Adolf Dauthage
- Born: 24 January 1839; Győr
- Died: 19 February 1898 (aged 59); Munich

Sándor Liezen-Mayer or Alexander von Liezen-Mayer (24 January 1839 – 19 February 1898) was a Hungarian-born German illustrator and history painter.

== Biography ==
Apparently destined for a military career, he showed an aptitude for drawing and, thanks to the intervention of an uncle, was able to attend the Academy of Fine Arts Vienna, where he studied with Karl von Blaas. After eighteen months there, he held his first exhibit in Pest in 1857. He then went to study at the Academy of Fine Arts, Munich under Hermann Anschütz but, by 1862, had found a position in the studios of Karl von Piloty, which had a decisive influence on his style. In 1865, he won an award for two drawings he entered in a contest at the academy and received a commission to portray the canonization of Elizabeth of Hungary, which was completed in 1867.

After the success attending this painting, he became swamped with orders. In association with his compatriot, Alexander von Wagner, he painted wall decorations for the dining room of a Russian prince and theater curtains for the Staatstheater am Gärtnerplatz. In 1870, he was invited to Vienna to paint a portrait of Emperor Franz Joseph, who was also King of Hungary. Two years later, he took an American-born wife. In 1876, he created a cycle of illustrations for Goethe's Faust, which achieved great success at the Munich Art Exhibition. They eventually led to his appointment as Director of the Stuttgart Academy of Arts. He decided, however, that he preferred to live in Munich, returning there in 1882 and becoming a professor at the academy. Among his best-known students were Gusztáv Kelety, Gebhard Fugel, Michael Zeno Diemer and Otto Greiner.

In addition to Faust, he also created illustrations for Ekkehard by Victor von Scheffel, Friedrich Schiller's Song of the Bell and many others. They were all issued in various deluxe woodcut and steel engraving editions by the art publisher, Theodor Stroefer.

== Selected paintings ==
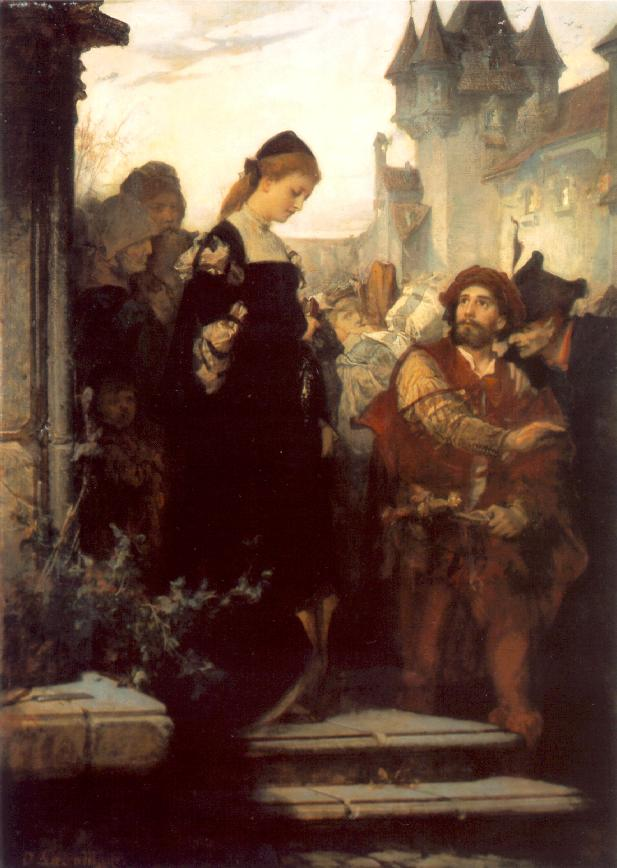
Faust and Marguerite

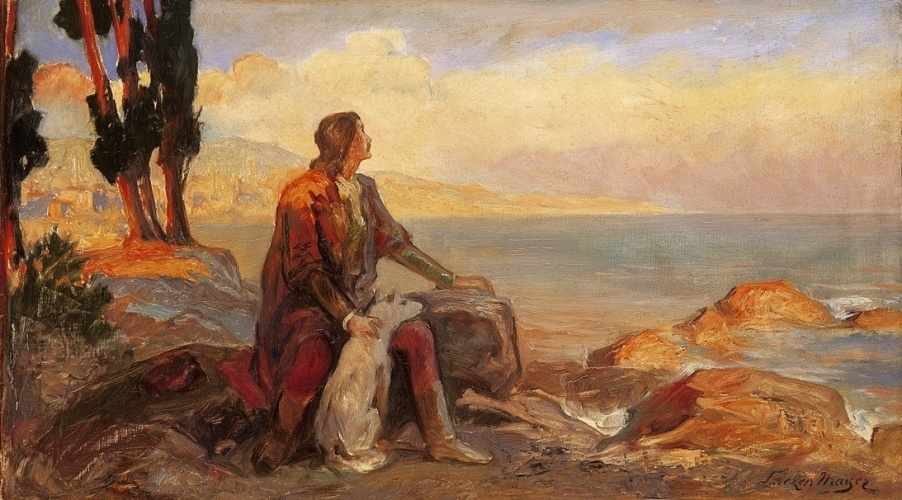
Rákóczi in Rodosto

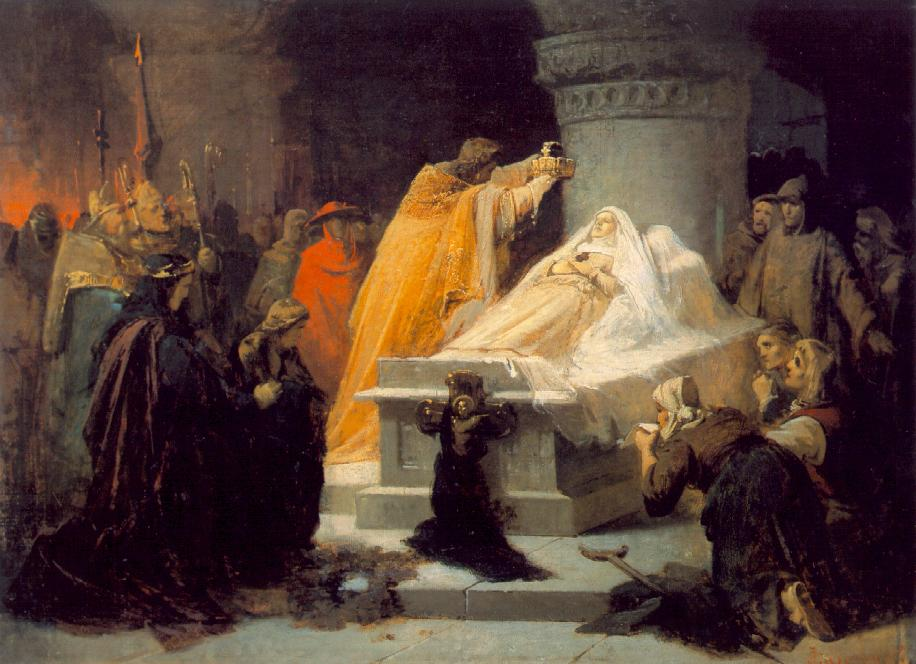
The Canonization of
Saint Elizabeth of Hungary

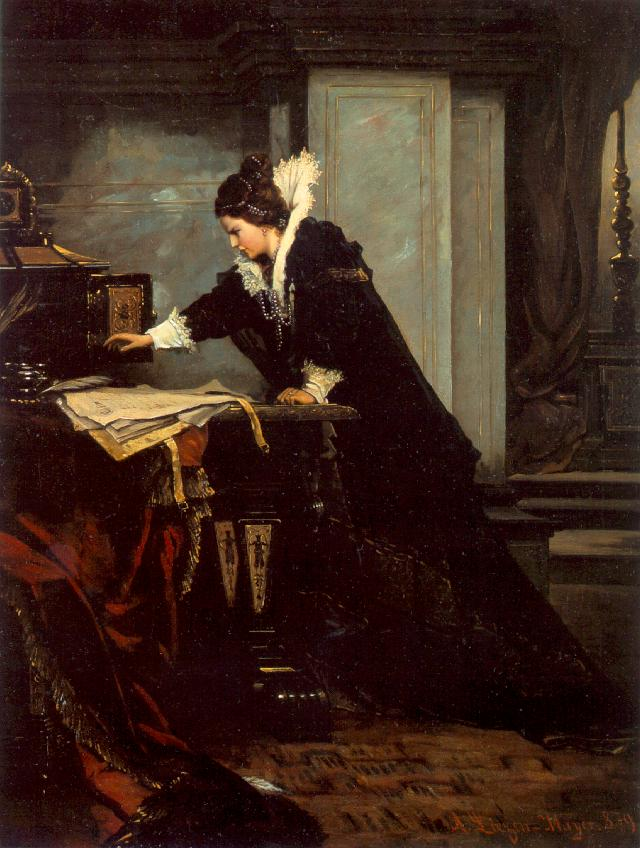
Mary Stuart's
Death Warrant
