= Centering (masonry) =

Temporary timber framework used in arch and bridge construction

Centering is a form of falsework—temporary timber framework used to support the stones or bricks of an arch or vault until the structure becomes self-supporting. In American masonry construction practice, it was widely employed on turnpikes, canals, and later railroad and highway works in the nineteenth century.

== Terminology ==
In British English the term is spelled centring; American usage prefers centering. Major dictionaries define it as a temporary framework, especially of timber, used to support an arch during construction.

== Description and components ==
For key parts of an arch, see arch terminology.

In American practice, centering consisted of timber ribs and lagging that formed the intrados line of the arch and carried the voussoirs until the keystone was placed and the mortar had set. The ribs, often called “frames”, were erected at right angles to the bridge axis and covered with planks or lagging running lengthwise under the arch ring. The framework typically rested on timber supports near the springing line and was adjusted by wedges to allow small vertical movements. A simple non-trussed frame was termed a common centering. For definitions of intrados, haunches, and related terms in brickwork practice, industry notes remain in wide use.

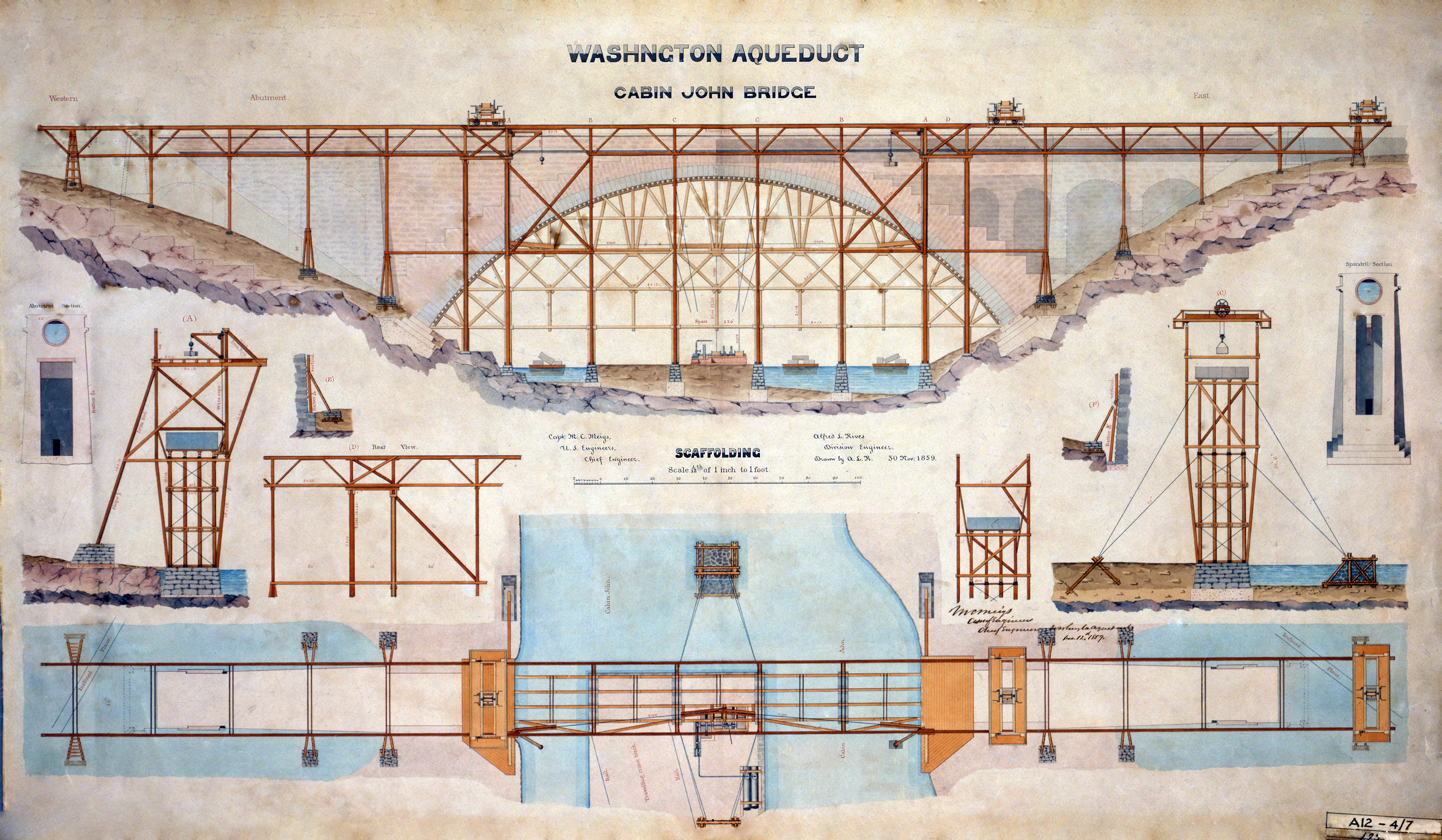
Cabin John Bridge (Union Arch), 1859 drawing

== Types of centering ==
Several types were used in nineteenth-century United States work, distinguished by structural form and span.

Solid wooden rib – For flat arches up to about 10 ft span and small openings; each rib cut from a single plank to the intrados curve and stiffened with cleats.

Built wooden rib – For spans roughly 10–30 ft; each rib made from two or three layers of short 2 in planks, fitted to break joints and fastened with nails or bolts, sometimes with iron plates; common in tunnel and culvert work.

Braced wooden rib – For semicircular arches about 15–30 ft; composite ribs with horizontal chords and diagonal braces for stiffness.

Trussed center – For large spans requiring high rigidity; essentially a timber truss shaped to the intrados. Historical examples include the centering for the Union Arch (Cabin John Bridge) and the Old Croton Aqueduct’s Sing Sing Kill Bridge (88-ft arch).

== Load and analysis ==
Contemporary American texts analyzed the pressures transmitted to centering as a function of voussoir weight and friction between stone and timber. Because friction introduces uncertainty, conservative design values were commonly recommended for temporary work. Reaction forces were reported as highest near the haunches rather than at the crown.

== Striking the centering ==
Removal (striking) was carried out by gradually lowering the ribs using timber wedges at their supports. Contemporary practice included paired folding wedges and long compound wedges for uniform lowering at the rib ends. On large spans, compound wedges about 10–12 inches square and 4–6 feet long were sometimes driven by a suspended ram. Sand jack supports were also used for controlled lowering of heavy centers.

Nineteenth-century practice varied with how the arch ring was built:

Dry-laid or “dry-packed” rings. Some American and British work used dry-laid stone or brick (with joints later packed or grouted). Where no mortar had to gain strength, accounts noted that centers could be struck soon after completing and wedging the ring, and in some brick methods immediately; modern surveys document early dry-laid stone arches in U.S. practice.

Mortared rings. Manuals advised withholding striking until the “solid part of the backing” was built and the mortar had set and hardened sufficiently, reflecting an empirical approach to curing. Treatises also recommended slight easing after the key was set to seat the ring, with full removal deferred until the mortar had adequate compressive strength,months for major bridge arches, but sooner for small culverts and sewers.

Period literature noted that mortars gain strength with time, but standardized acceptance ages (for example, 7- and 28-day tests) became codified in the early twentieth century. One 1889 text presented data on the “effect of time on the strength of mortars,” and a 1917 U.S. Bureau of Standards circular specified 7- and 28-day strength requirements for Portland cement, including that 28-day strength exceed 7-day strength. Modern brick-industry guidance recommends keeping centering in place at least seven days, with longer periods in cold weather or where structural analysis requires it.

== Application in American bridge construction ==
Carpenters and masons working on turnpike, canal, and railroad projects in the early nineteenth century used timber centering built from locally available lumber. The technique remained standard for American masonry bridge work throughout the nineteenth century and persisted into the early twentieth century, after which steel framing and reinforced-concrete formwork became common for new construction. Contractors also adopted reusable steel truss centering for some reinforced-concrete arch programs; for example, the Philadelphia and Reading Railroad’s Susquehanna River bridge reconstruction (1920–1924) seated steel truss centering in pier pockets and moved it span-to-span with a traveling crane. State and federal historic-context studies document surviving masonry-arch highway and railroad bridges that relied on centering during construction.

== Legacy ==
Centering illustrates the junction of craft and analysis in nineteenth-century American civil engineering. Historic drawings and field records preserved by the Historic American Engineering Record (HAER) and related programs document typical falsework for turnpike culverts, canal aqueducts, and railroad masonry arches. Pocket-book references used by American engineers also summarized centering types, striking methods, and rules of thumb for spans and rise.
