= List of architectural vault types =

The following is a list of types of arched structures known in architecture as vaults.

Name	Image	Notes
Annular vault	Arena of Nimes	A barrel vault covering a curved space, such as the ambulatory of a church.
Barrel vault	Abbey Church of Sainte-Foy, Conques	An arch extended in depth to form a ceiling. The simplest form of vault, consisting of a continuous surface of semicircular or pointed sections. It resembles a barrel which has been cut in half lengthwise and is also known as a tunnel vault or wagon vault. A longitudinal barrel vault follows the main direction of the building. Transverse barrel vaults must be carried on diaphragm arches and are less common, but may be seen in the Church of St. Philibert, Tournus and in some examples of Cistercian architecture.
Catalan vault		A type of low arch made of plain bricks. It is traditionally constructed by laying bricks lengthwise, making it a much gentler curve than has generally been produced by other methods of construction.
Catenary vault		A barrel vault of catenary profile; see also parabolic vault
Cloister vault		A vault with four convex surfaces, which may be thought of as a square-based dome or an inverse groin vault. Despite the name, cloister vaults are much less common than other types over cloister galleries.
Corbel vault		The equivalent to a corbel arch that a barrel vault is to a normal arch. The stones are laid horizontally and stepped (corbelled) inwards, rather than radiating around an arch. Used in pre-Roman architecture around the Mediterranean, and on the Indian subcontinent.
Crazy vault	Lincoln Cathedral	Term for the experimental asymmetrical vaulting over St Hugh's Choir at Lincoln Cathedral.
Cross vault		See groin vault.
Cycloidal vault		A vault in which the diameter across the springline is equal to the circumference of a circle fitting inside the space between the apex of the vault and the diameter line. This particular proportion system creates very little lateral thrust from the vault structure.
Diamond vault		A form of vault used in the Late Gothic and Renaissance style, which is based on an elaborate system of angular recesses in a manner resembling diamonds. It was widely used especially in Central European countries.
Dome	St Peter's Basilica, Rome	A hemispherical vault. May be pierced at the top with an oculus, lantern or cupola. May be reinforced with ribs. When erected above a square or octagonal structure, the transition is made with squinches or pendentives.
Domical vault	Angers Cathedral	Can refer to either a cloister vault (q.v.) or a form of rib vault used in Angevin Gothic in which the central boss of the vault rises higher than the keystones of the transverse arches, creating an undulating ridge.
Fan vault	St Andrew's Church, Cullompton, England	A vault which consists of fan-shaped half conoids which usually meet at the centre. Used exclusively in the Perpendicular style of late-Gothic England
Groin vault	Speyer Cathedral	A groin vault is formed when two barrel vaults intersect. Sometimes the arches of groin vaults may be pointed instead of round. Used in Roman, Byzantine and Romanesque architecture.
Handkerchief vault		See dome.
Hyperbolic paraboloid vault	Scotiabank Saddledome, Calgary	A vault following the hyperbolic paraboloid shape, used in Modern architecture for its structural performance.
Lierne vault	Canterbury Cathedral	A Lierne (from the French lier – to bind) in late-Gothic rib-vaulting is a tertiary rib spanning between two other ribs, instead of from a springer, or to the central boss. See also stellar vault.
Muqarnas	Alhambra, Granada	Muqarnas is the Arabic term for a stalactite vault, an architectural ornament developed around the middle of the tenth century in north-eastern Iran and almost simultaneously, but apparently independently, in central North Africa. A muqarnas is a three-dimensional architectural decoration composed of niche-like elements arranged in tiers. The two-dimensional projection of a muqarnas vault consists of a small variety of simple geometrical elements.
Net vault	Tewkesbury Abbey	A tunnel vault with applied ribs giving a net-like appearance. Used in late-Gothic architecture in western England and Central Europe.
Nubian vault		A mud brick vault following a catenary curve.
Palm vault	Church of the Jacobins, Tolouse	A rib vault that spreads from a central column, especially a tierceron vault.
Parabolic vault	Arch of Ctesiphon	A vault (usually a barrel vault) following the structurally efficient parabola shape.
Pendant vault	Henry VII Chapel, Westminster Abbey, London.	A late-Gothic vault in which decorative pendants hang from the main vault, supported by concealed structure.
Ploughshare vault		A rib vault where the wall ribs spring from a higher position than those of the diagonal ribs.
Quadrant vault	Arena of Nimes	A barrel vault with only half an arch, used for abutment.
Quadripartite vault	Salisbury Cathedral	A rib vault where the bay is divided by diagonal and transverse ribs into four cells or webs.
Rampant vault		A barrel vault where one springing point is higher than the opposite springing point, making it asymmetrical.
Rib vault	Durham Cathedral	A rib vault is any vault reinforced by masonry ribs, most associated with Gothic architecture. Also known as a ribbed vault. Types of rib vault include quadripartite vaults, sexpartite vaults, tierceron vaults and lierne vaults, but not fan vaults.
Sail vault		See dome.
Skeleton vault	Bristol Cathedral	Any form of rib vault in which the ribs are detached from the infill to create a more complex effect. Several varieties may be seen at Bristol Cathedral.
Sexpartite vault	Notre Dame, Paris	A rib vault divided into six sections by an additional transverse arch.
Shell vault	Smithfield Poultry Market	One of a number of types of thin self-supporting vaults, used to cover large spans in Modern architecture.
Stalactite vault		See Muqarnas.
Stellar vault		A form of lierne vault in which the liernes form a star pattern.
Stilted vault		See ploughshare vault.
Surbased vault	Fort Gorges, Maine	A vault with a cross section less than a semicircle, i.e. a segment.
Surmounted vault		A vault with a cross section greater than a semicircle, i.e. a horseshoe arch.
Timbrel vault		From Guastavino tile. U.S.-patented (1885) system using interlocking terracotta tiles and layers of mortar in a thin skin, with the tiles following the curve of the roof as opposed to horizontal (corbelling), or perpendicular to the curve (Roman). This is known as timbrel vaulting because of supposed likeness to the skin of a timbrel or tambourine.
Tierceron vault	Exeter Cathedral	A rib vault with additional non-structural ribs, rising from the springing to the ridge rib.
Tripartite vault		The resulting intersection, triangular on plan, of three vaults.
Tunnel vault		See barrel vault.
Umbrella vault		A vault in which ribs rise from a central column and radiate outwards, often seen at the top of spiral staircases.
Wagon vault		See barrel vault.
