= Vault (architecture) =

Architectural term for an arched roof

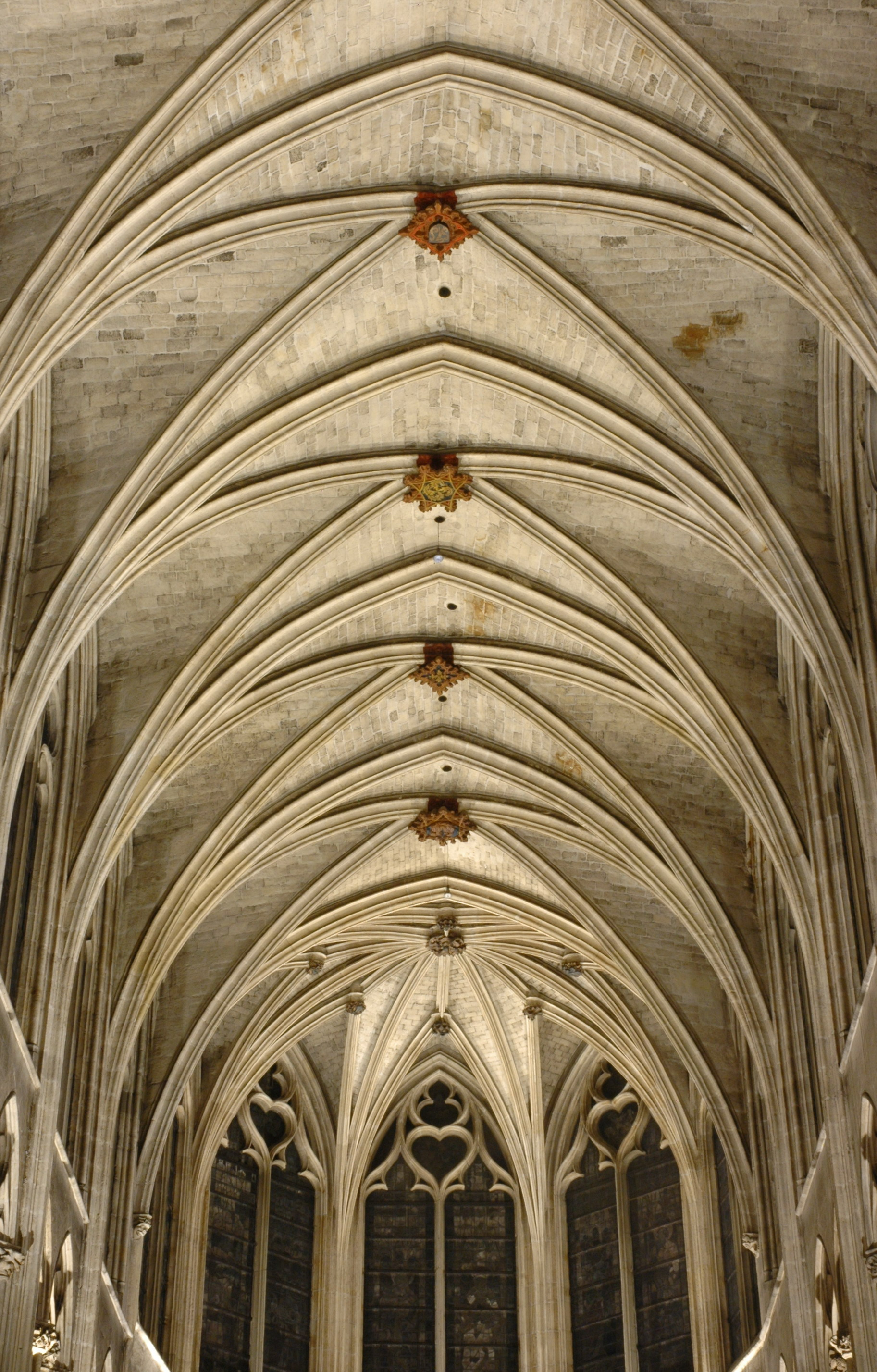
Gothic rib vault ceiling of the Saint-Séverin church in Paris

In architecture, a vault (French voûte, from Italian volta) is a self-supporting arched form, commonly of stone or brick, serving to cover a space with a ceiling or roof. As in building an arch, a temporary support is needed while rings of voussoirs are constructed and the rings placed in position. Until the topmost voussoir, the keystone, is positioned, the vault is not self-supporting. Where timber is easily obtained, this temporary support is provided by centering consisting of a framed truss with a semicircular or segmental head, which supports the voussoirs until the ring of the whole arch is completed.

The Mycenaeans (ca. 1800–1050 BC) built tholos tombs, also called beehive tombs, which were underground structures with conical vaults. This type of vault is one of the earliest evidences of curved brick architecture without the use of stone arches, and its construction represented an innovative technique for covering circular spaces.

== History and types ==
Corbelled vaults, also called false vaults, with horizontally joined layers of stone have been documented since prehistoric times; in the 14th century BC from Mycenae. They were built regionally until modern times.

The real vault construction with radially joined stones was already known to the Egyptians and Assyrians and was introduced into the building practice of the West by the Etruscans. The Romans in particular developed vault construction further and built barrel, cross and dome vaults. Some outstanding examples have survived in Rome, e.g. the Pantheon and the Basilica of Maxentius.

Brick vaults have been used in Egypt since the early 3rd millennium BC, and were widely used by the end of the 8th century BC, when Keystone vaults were built.”. However, monumental temple buildings of the pharaonic culture in the Nile Valley did not use vaults, since even the huge portals with widths of more than 7 meters were spanned with cut stone beams.

=== Dome ===
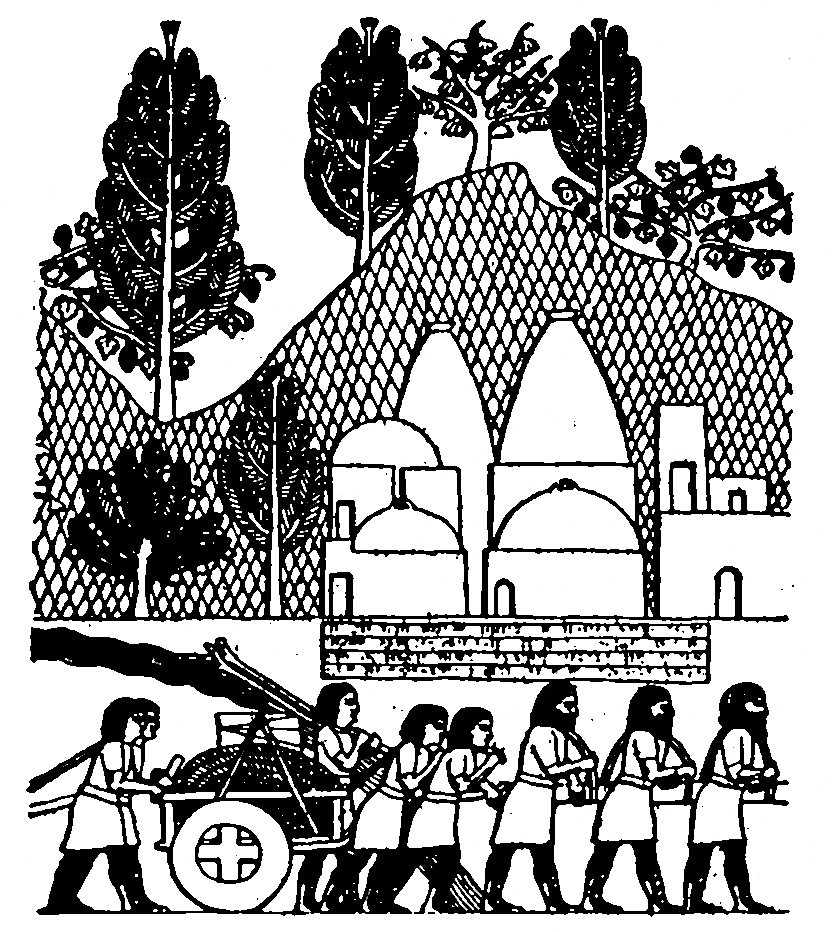
Assyrian bas-relief from Nimrud showing domed structures in the background

Amongst the earliest known examples of any form of vaulting is to be found in the Neolithic village of Khirokitia on Cyprus. Dating from c. 6000 BCE, the circular buildings supported beehive shaped corbel domed vaults of unfired mud-bricks and also represent the first evidence for settlements with an upper floor. Similar beehive tombs, called tholoi, exist in Crete and Northern Iraq. Their construction differs from that at Khirokitia in that most appear partially buried and make provision for a dromos entry.

The inclusion of domes, however, represents a wider sense of the word vault. The distinction between the two is that a vault is essentially an arch which is extruded into the third dimension, whereas a dome is an arch revolved around its vertical axis.

=== Pitched brick barrel vault ===
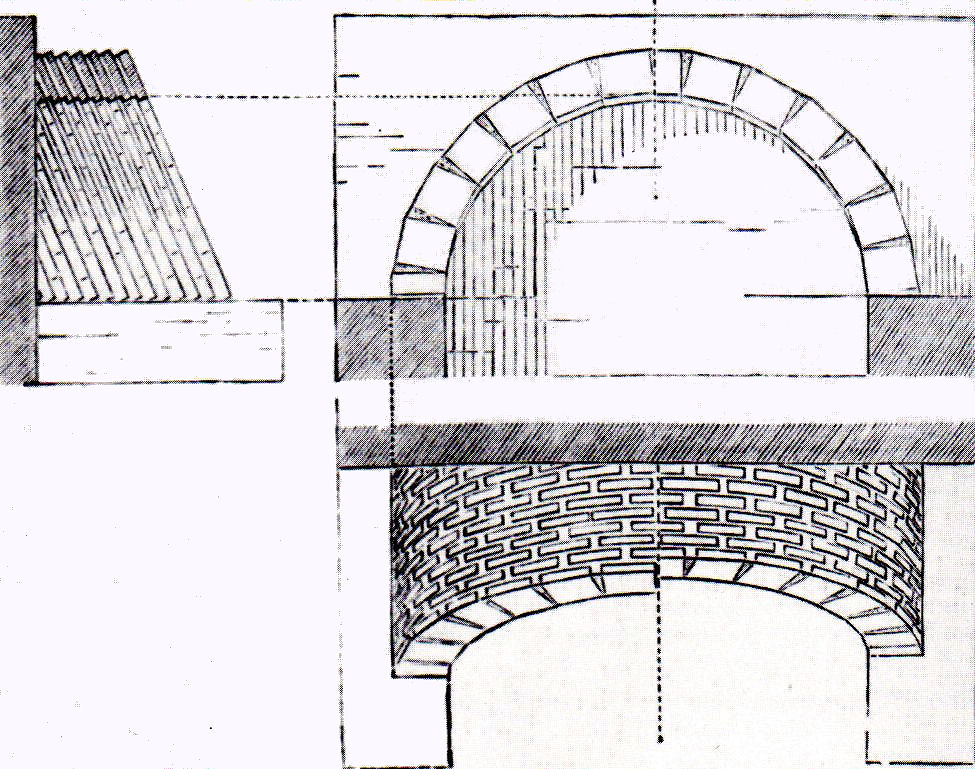
In a pitched-brick vault the bricks lean (are pitched) against an existing wall.

Pitched-brick vaults are named for their construction, the bricks are installed vertically (not radially) and are leaning (pitched) at an angle: This allows their construction to be completed without the use of centering. Examples have been found in archaeological excavations in Mesopotamia dating to the 2nd and 3rd millennium BCE, which were set in gypsum mortar.

=== Barrel vault ===
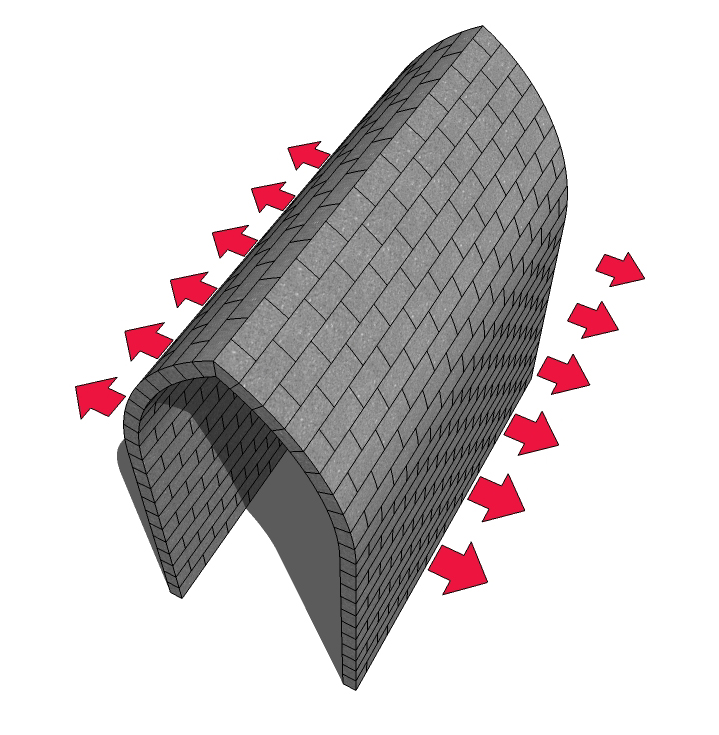
Pointed barrel vault showing direction of lateral forces

A barrel vault is the simplest form of a vault, semi-circular in cross-section, and resembles a barrel or tunnel cut lengthwise in half. The effect is that of a structure composed of continuous semicircular or pointed sections.

The earliest known examples of barrel vaults were built by the Sumerians, possibly under the ziggurat at Nippur in Babylonia, which was built of fired bricks cemented with clay mortar.

The earliest barrel vaults in ancient Egypt are thought to be those in the granaries built by the 19th dynasty Pharaoh Ramesses II, the ruins of which are behind the Ramesseum, at Thebes. The span was 12 feet (3.7 m) and the lower part of the arch was built in horizontal courses, up to about one-third of the height, and the rings above were inclined back at a slight angle, so that the bricks of each ring, laid flatwise, adhered till the ring was completed, no centering of any kind being required; the vault thus formed was elliptic in section, arising from the method of its construction. A similar system of construction was employed for the vault over the great hall at Ctesiphon, where the material employed was fired bricks or tiles of great dimensions, cemented with mortar; but the span was close upon 83 feet (25 m), and the thickness of the vault was nearly 5 feet (1.5 m) at the top, there being four rings of brickwork.

Assyrian palaces used pitched-brick vaults, made with sun-dried mudbricks, for gates, subterranean graves and drains. During the reign of king Sennacherib they were used to construct aqueducts, such as those at Jerwan. In the provincial city Dūr-Katlimmu they were used to create vaulted platforms. The tradition of their erection, however, would seem to have been handed down to their successors in Mesopotamia, viz. to the Sassanians, who in their palaces in Sarvestan and Firouzabad built domes of similar form to those shown in the Nimrud sculptures, the chief difference being that, constructed in rubble stone and cemented with mortar, they still exist, though probably abandoned on the Islamic invasion in the 7th century.

=== Byzantine vaults and domes ===
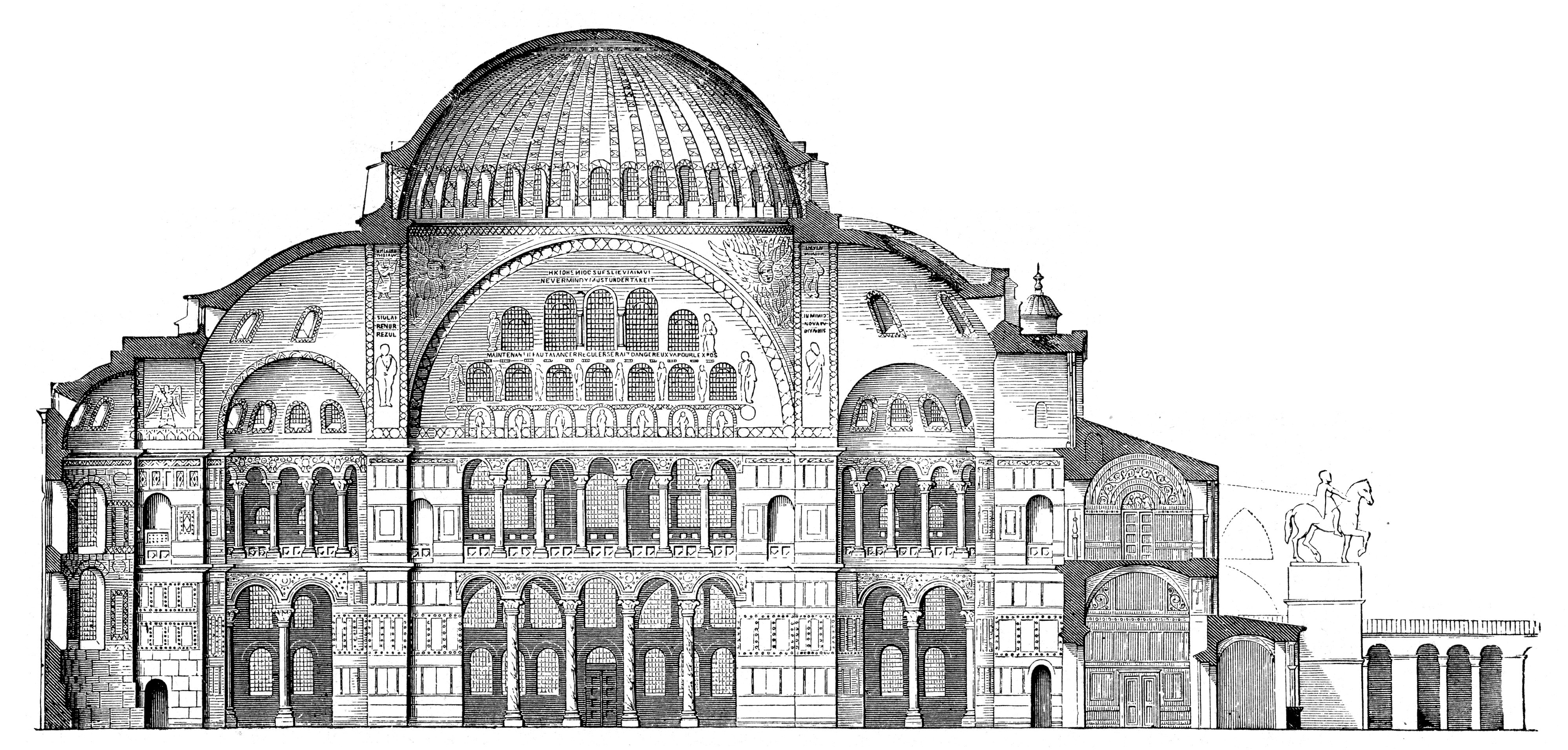
Section through the Hagia Sophia in Istanbul

The vault of the Basilica of Maxentius, completed by Constantine, was the last great work carried out in Rome before its fall, and two centuries pass before the next important development is found in the Church of the Holy Wisdom (Hagia Sophia) at Constantinople. Probably, the realization of the great advance in the science of vaulting shown in this church owed something to the eastern tradition of dome vaulting seen in the Assyrian domes, which are known to us only by the representations in the bas-relief from Nimrud, because in the great water cisterns in Istanbul, known as the Basilica Cistern and Bin bir direk (cistern with a thousand and one columns), we find the intersecting groin vaults of the Romans already replaced by small cupolas or domes. These domes, however, are of small dimensions when compared with that projected and carried out by Justinian in the Hagia Sophia. Previous to this the greatest dome was that of the Pantheon at Rome, but this was carried on an immense wall 20 feet (6.1 m) thick, and except small niches or recesses in the thickness of the wall could not be extended, so that Justinian apparently instructed his architect to provide an immense hemicycle or apse at the eastern end, a similar apse at the western end, and great arches on either side, the walls under which would be pierced with windows. Unlike the Pantheon dome, the upper portions of which are made of concrete, Byzantine domes were made of brick, which were lighter and thinner, but more vulnerable to the forces exerted onto them.

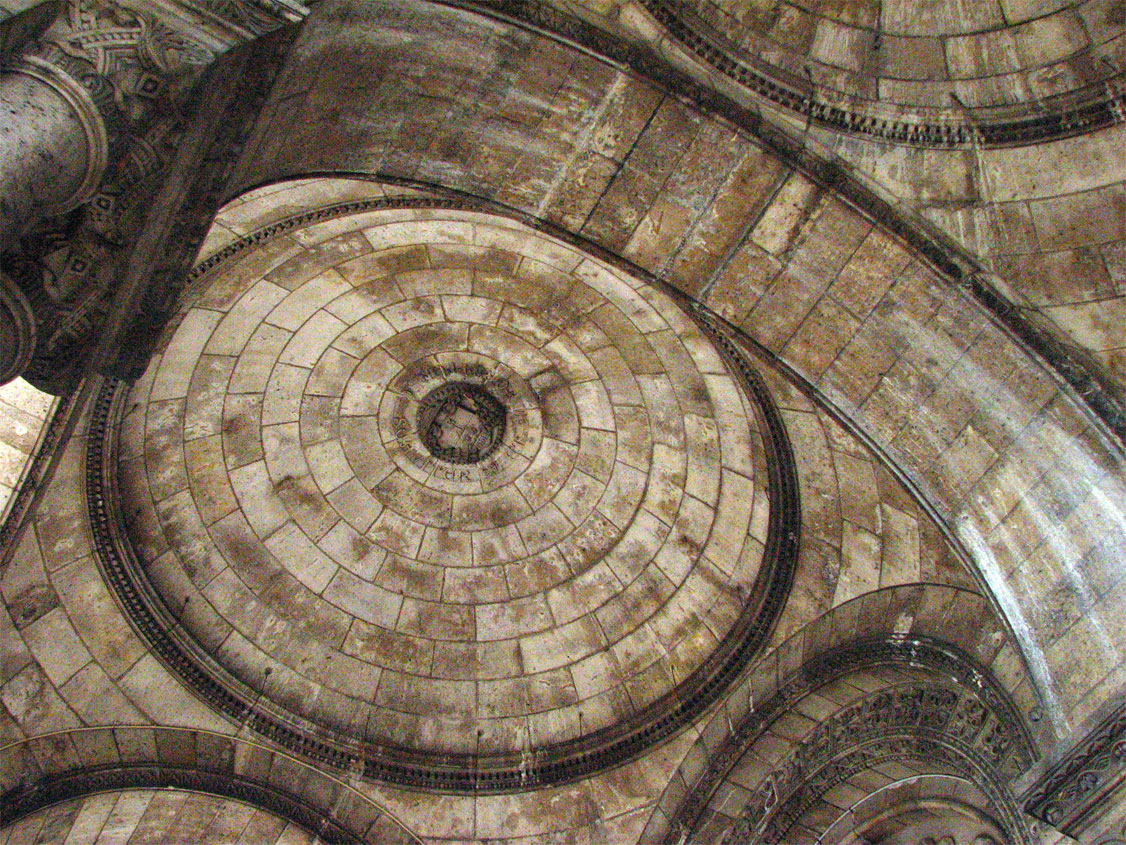
Neo-Byzantine vaults in portal of the Basilique du Sacré-Cœur, Paris, France

The diagram shows the outlines of the solution of the problem. If a hemispherical dome is cut by four vertical planes, the intersection gives four semicircular arches; if cut in addition by a horizontal plane tangent to the top of these arches, it describes a circle; that portion of the sphere which is below this circle and between the arches, forming a spherical spandrel, is the pendentive, and its radius is equal to the diagonal of the square on which the four arches rest. Having obtained a circle for the base of the dome, it is not necessary that the upper portion of the dome should spring from the same level as the arches, or that its domical surface should be a continuation of that of the pendentive. The first and second dome of the Hagia Sophia fell, so that Justinian determined to raise it, possibly to give greater lightness to the structure, but mainly in order to obtain increased light for the interior of the church. This was effected by piercing it with forty windows – the effect of which, as the light streaming through these windows, gave the dome the appearance of being suspended in the air. The pendentive which carried the dome rested on four great arches, the thrust of those crossing the church being counteracted by immense buttresses which traversed the aisles, and the other two partly by smaller arches in the apse, the thrust being carried to the outer walls, and to a certain extent by the side walls which were built under the arches. From the description given by Procopius we gather that the centering employed for the great arches consisted of a wall erected to support them during their erection. The construction of the pendentives is not known, but it is surmised that to the top of the pendentives they were built in horizontal courses of brick, projecting one over the other, the projecting angles being cut off afterwards and covered with stucco in which the mosaics were embedded; this was the method employed in the erection of the Périgordian domes, to which we shall return; these, however, were of less diameter than those of the Hagia Sophia, being only about 40 to 60 feet (18 m) instead of 107 feet (33 m) The apotheosis of Byzantine architecture was reached in Hagia Sophia, for although it formed the model on which all subsequent Byzantine churches were based, so far as their plan was concerned, no domes approaching the former in dimensions were even attempted. The principal difference in some later examples is that which took place in the form of the pendentive on which the dome was carried. Instead of the spherical spandril of Hagia Sophia, large niches were formed in the angles, as in the Mosque of Damascus, which was built by Byzantine workmen for the Al-Walid I in CE 705; these gave an octagonal base on which the hemispherical dome rested; or again, as in the Sassanian palaces of Sarvestan and Firouzabad of the 4th and 5th century, when a series of concentric arch rings, projecting one in front of the other, were built, giving also an octagonal base; each of these pendentives is known as a squinch.

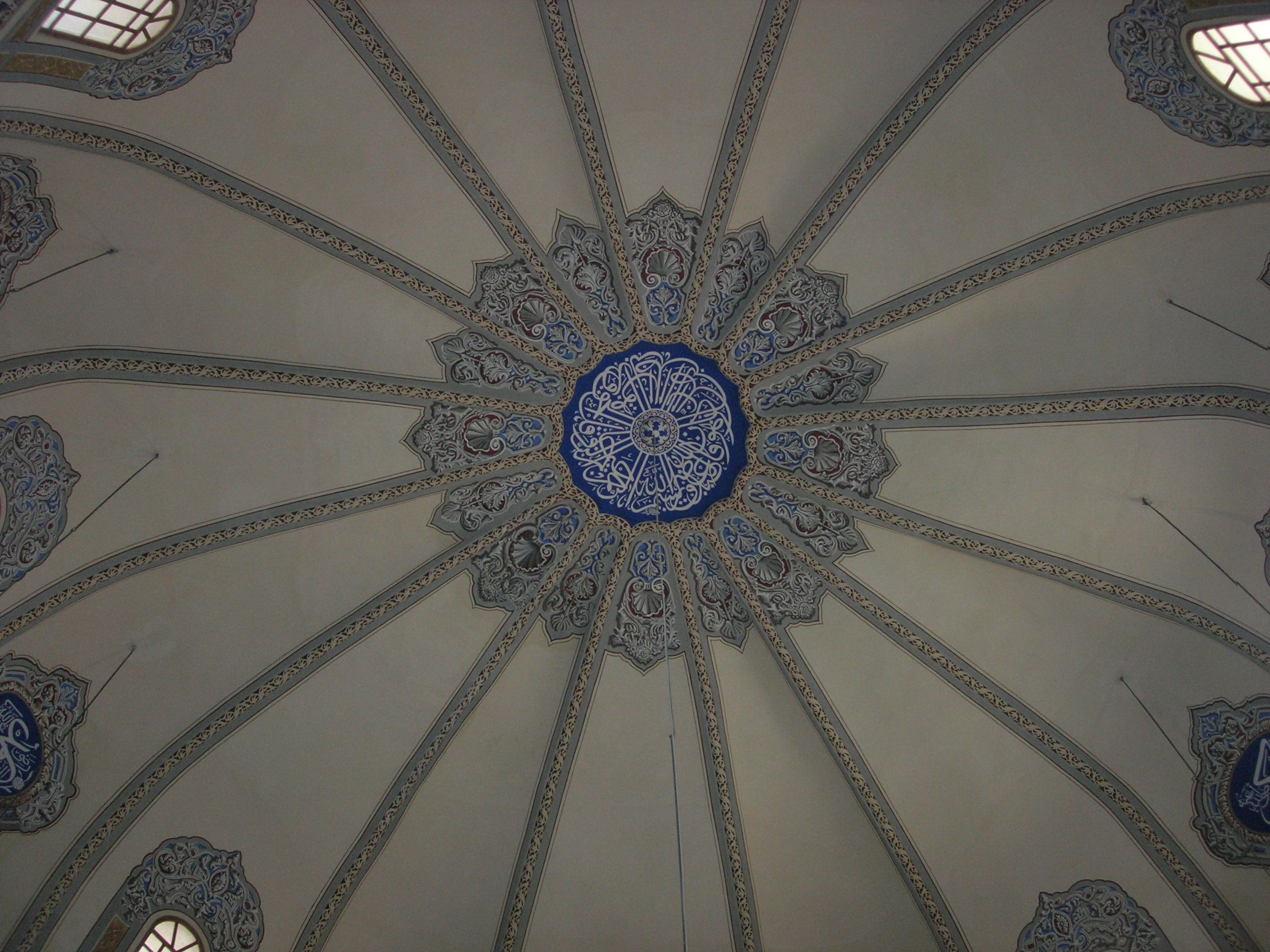
The dome of the Church of the Saints Sergius and Bacchus

There is one other remarkable vault, also built by Justinian, in the Church of the Saints Sergius and Bacchus in Constantinople. The central area of this church was octagonal on plan, and the dome is divided into sixteen compartments; of these eight consist of broad flat bands rising from the centre of each of the walls, and the alternate eight are concave cells over the angles of the octagon, which externally and internally give to the roof the appearance of an umbrella.

=== Romanesque vaulting ===
Nave of Lisbon Cathedral with a barrel-vaulted soffit, no clerestory windows and a rose window at one end

Although the dome constitutes the principal characteristic of the Byzantine church, throughout Asia Minor are numerous examples in which the naves are vaulted with the semicircular barrel vault, and this is the type of vault found throughout the south of France in the 11th and 12th centuries, the only change being the occasional substitution of the pointed barrel vault, adopted not only on account of its exerting a less thrust, but because, as pointed out by Fergusson (vol. ii. p. 46), the roofing tiles were laid directly on the vault and a less amount of filling in at the top was required.

The continuous thrust of the barrel vault in these cases was met either by semicircular or pointed barrel vaults on the aisles, which had only half the span of the nave; of this there is an interesting example in the Chapel of Saint John in the Tower of London – and sometimes by half-barrel vaults. The great thickness of the walls, however, required in such constructions would seem to have led to another solution of the problem of roofing over churches with incombustible material, viz. that which is found throughout Périgord and La Charente, where a series of domes carried on pendentives covered over the nave, the chief peculiarities of these domes being the fact that the arches carrying them form part of the pendentives, which are all built in horizontal courses.

The intersecting and groined vault of the Romans was employed in the early Christian churches in Rome, but only over the aisles, which were comparatively of small span, but in these there was a tendency to raise the centres of these vaults, which became slightly domical; in all these cases centering was employed.

=== Groin vaults ===
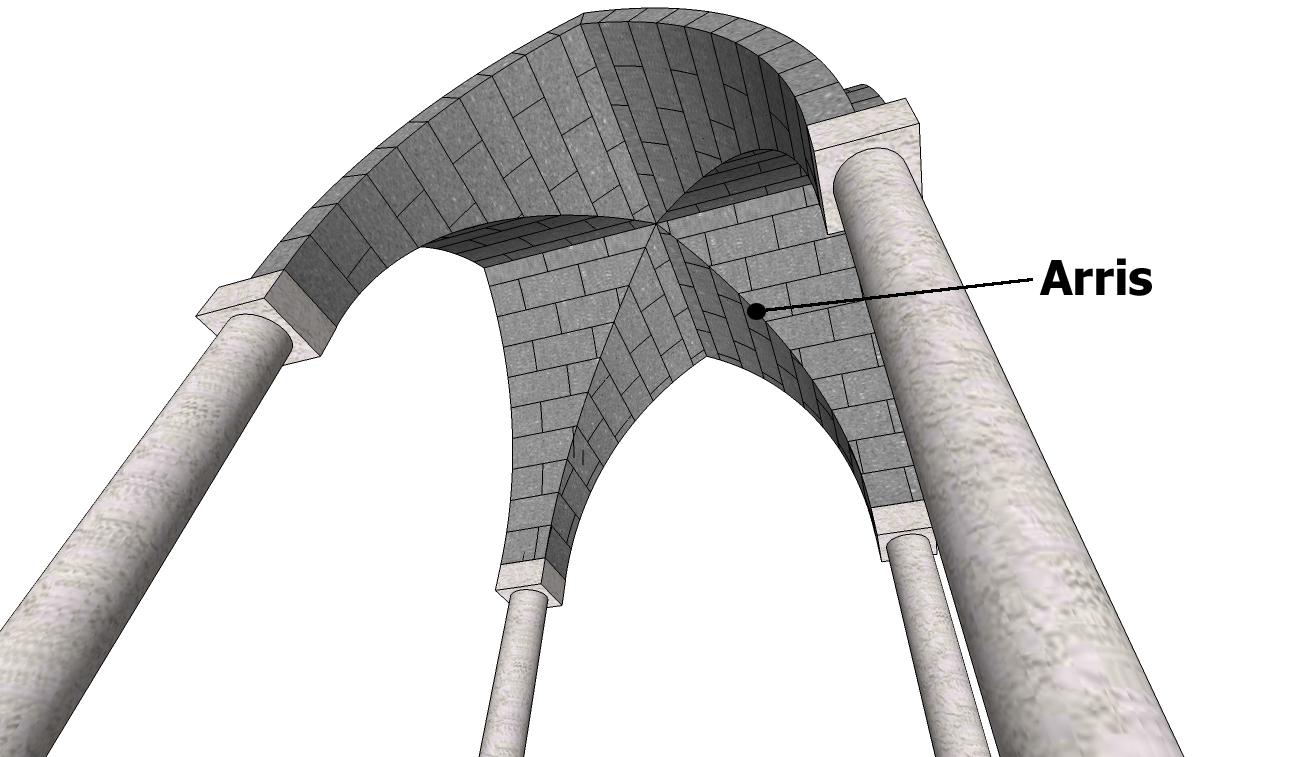
A groin vault viewed from the underside, showing the arris or 'groin'

A groin vault is formed by the intersection of two barrel vaults at right angles, resulting in the formation of angles or groins along the lines of transition between the webs. In these bays the longer transverse arches are semi-circular, as are the shorter longitudinal arches. The curvatures of these bounding arches were apparently used as the basis for the web centrings, which was created in the form of two intersecting tunnels as though each web was an arch projected horizontally in three dimensions.

The earliest example is thought to be over a small hall at Pergamum, in Asia Minor, but its first employment over halls of great dimensions is due to the Romans. When two semicircular barrel vaults of the same diameter cross one another their intersection (a true ellipse) is known as a groin vault, down which the thrust of the vault is carried to the cross walls; if a series of two or more barrel vaults intersect one another, the weight is carried on to the piers at their intersection and the thrust is transmitted to the outer cross walls; thus in the Roman reservoir at Baiae, known as the Piscina Mirabilis, a series of five aisles with semicircular barrel vaults are intersected by twelve cross aisles, the vaults being carried on 48 piers and thick external walls. The width of these aisles being only about 13 feet (4.0 m) there was no great difficulty in the construction of these vaults, but in the Roman Baths of Caracalla the tepidarium had a span of 80 feet (24 m), more than twice that of an English cathedral, so that its construction both from the statical and economical point of view was of the greatest importance. The researches of M. Choisy (L'Art de bâtir chez les Romains), based on a minute examination of those portions of the vaults which still remain in situ, have shown that, on a comparatively slight centering, consisting of trusses placed about 10 feet (3.0 m) apart and covered with planks laid from truss to truss, were laid – to begin with – two layers of the Roman brick (measuring nearly 2 feet (0.61 m) square and 2 in. thick); on these and on the trusses transverse rings of brick were built with longitudinal ties at intervals; on the brick layers and embedding the rings and cross ties concrete was thrown in horizontal layers, the haunches being filled in solid, and the surface sloped on either side and covered over with a tile roof of low pitch laid direct on the concrete. The rings relieved the centering from the weight imposed, and the two layers of bricks carried the concrete till it had set.

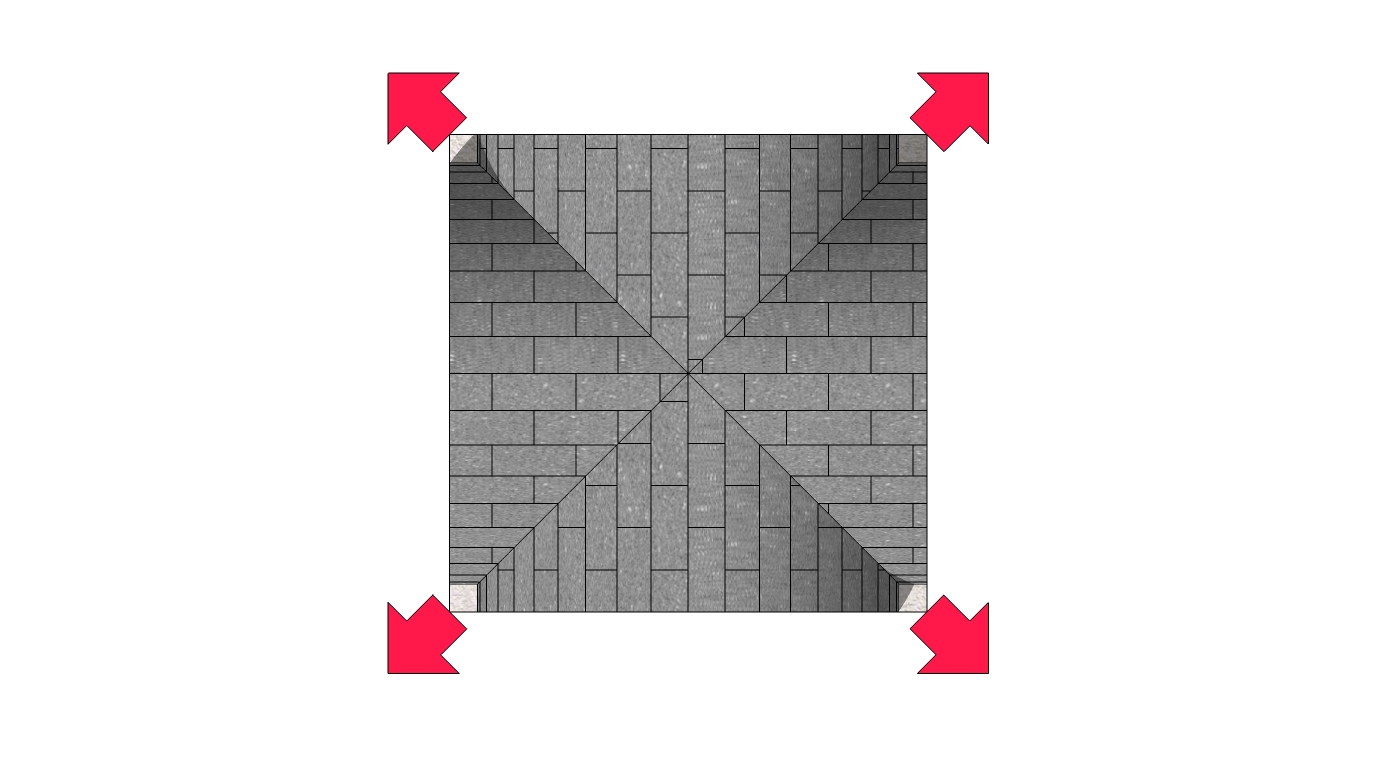
Plan of a groin vault from above showing resultant outward thrust

As the walls carrying these vaults were also built in concrete with occasional bond courses of brick, the whole structure was homogeneous. One of the important ingredients of the mortar was a volcanic deposit found near Rome, known as pozzolana, which, when the concrete had set, not only made the concrete as solid as the rock itself, but to a certain extent neutralized the thrust of the vaults, which formed shells equivalent to that of a metal lid; the Romans, however, do not seem to have recognized the value of this pozzolana mixture, for they otherwise provided amply for the counteracting of any thrust which might exist by the erection of cross walls and buttresses. In the tepidaria of the Thermae and in the basilica of Constantine, in order to bring the thrust well within the walls, the main barrel vault of the hall was brought forward on each side and rested on detached columns, which constituted the principal architectural decoration. In cases where the cross vaults intersecting were not of the same span as those of the main vault, the arches were either stilted so that their soffits might be of the same height, or they formed smaller intersections in the lower part of the vault; in both of these cases, however, the intersections or groins were twisted, for which it was very difficult to form a centering, and, moreover, they were of disagreeable effect: though every attempt was made to mask this in the decoration of the vault by panels and reliefs modelled in stucco.

=== Rib vault ===
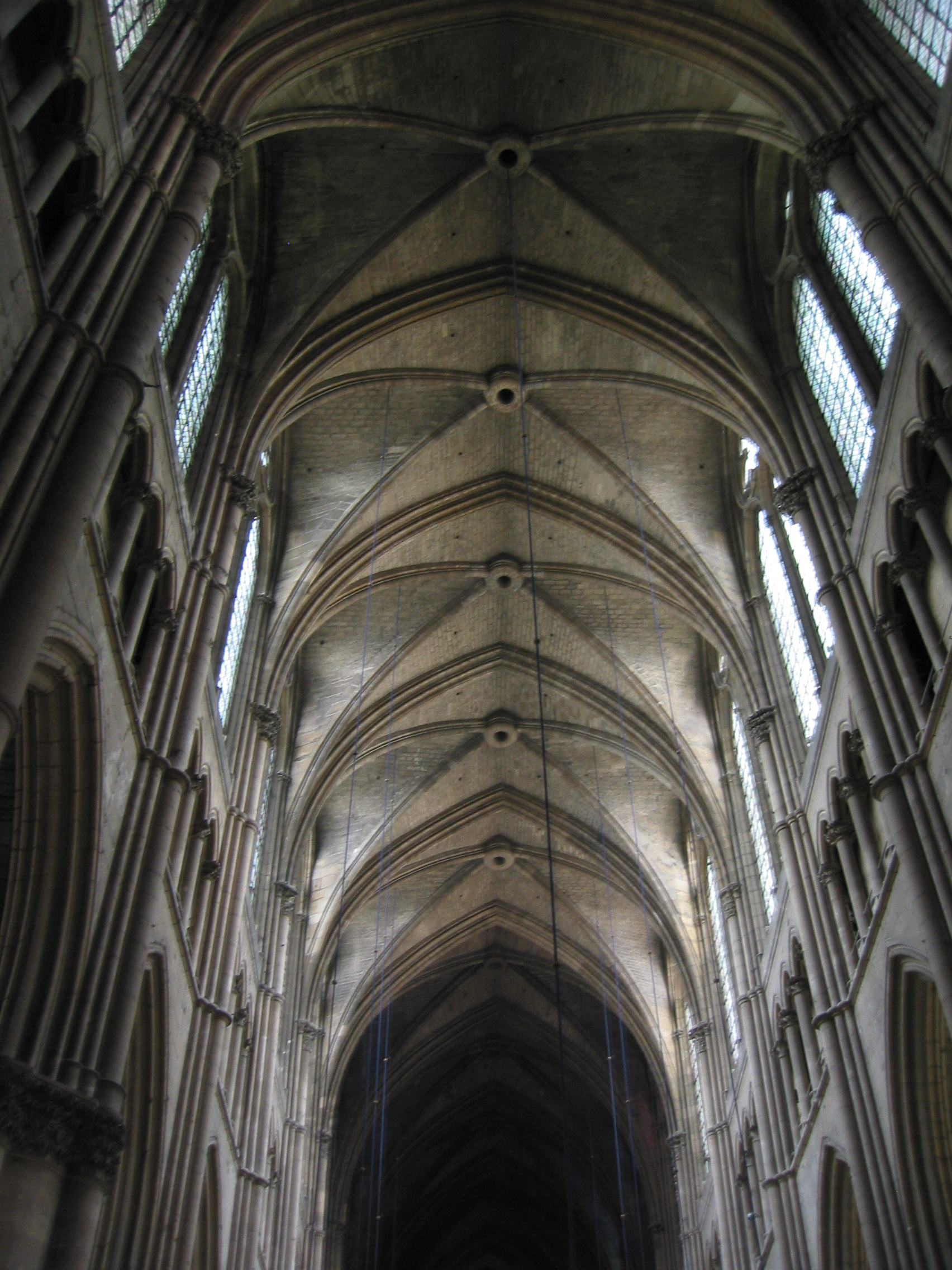
The rib vault of Reims Cathedral, France

A rib vault is one in which all of the groins are covered by ribs or diagonal ribs in the form of segmental arches. Their curvatures are defined by the bounding arches. Whilst the transverse arches retain the same semi-circular profile as their groin-vaulted counterparts, the longitudinal arches are pointed with both arcs having their centres on the impost line. This allows the latter to correspond more closely to the curvatures of the diagonal ribs, producing a straight tunnel running from east to west.

Reference has been made to the rib vault in Roman work, where the intersecting barrel vaults were not of the same diameter. Their construction must at all times have been somewhat difficult, but where the barrel vaulting was carried round over the choir aisle and was intersected (as in St Bartholomew-the-Great in Smithfield, London) by semicones instead of cylinders, it became worse and the groins more complicated. This would seem to have led to a change of system and to the introduction of a new feature, which completely revolutionized the construction of the vault. Hitherto the intersecting features were geometrical surfaces, of which the diagonal groins were the intersections, elliptical in form, generally weak in construction and often twisting. The medieval builder reversed the process, and set up the diagonal ribs first, which were utilized as permanent centres, and on these he carried his vault or web, which henceforward took its shape from the ribs. Instead of the elliptical curve which was given by the intersection of two semicircular barrel vaults, or cylinders, he employed the semicircular arch for the diagonal ribs; this, however, raised the centre of the square bay vaulted above the level of the transverse arches and of the wall ribs, and thus gave the appearance of a dome to the vault, such as may be seen in the nave of Sant'Ambrogio, Florence. To meet this, at first the transverse and wall ribs were stilted, or the upper part of their arches was raised, as in the Abbaye-aux-Hommes at Caen, and Lessay Abbey, in Normandy. The problem was ultimately solved by the introduction of the pointed arch for the transverse and wall ribs – the pointed arch had long been known and employed, on account of its much greater strength and of the less thrust it exerted on the walls. When employed for the ribs of a vault, however narrow the span might be, by adopting a pointed arch, its summit could be made to range in height with the diagonal rib; and, moreover, when utilized for the ribs of the annular vault, as in the aisle round the apsidal termination of the choir, it was not necessary that the half ribs on the outer side should be in the same plane as those of the inner side; for when the opposite ribs met in the centre of the annular vault, the thrust was equally transmitted from one to the other, and being already a broken arch the change of its direction was not noticeable.

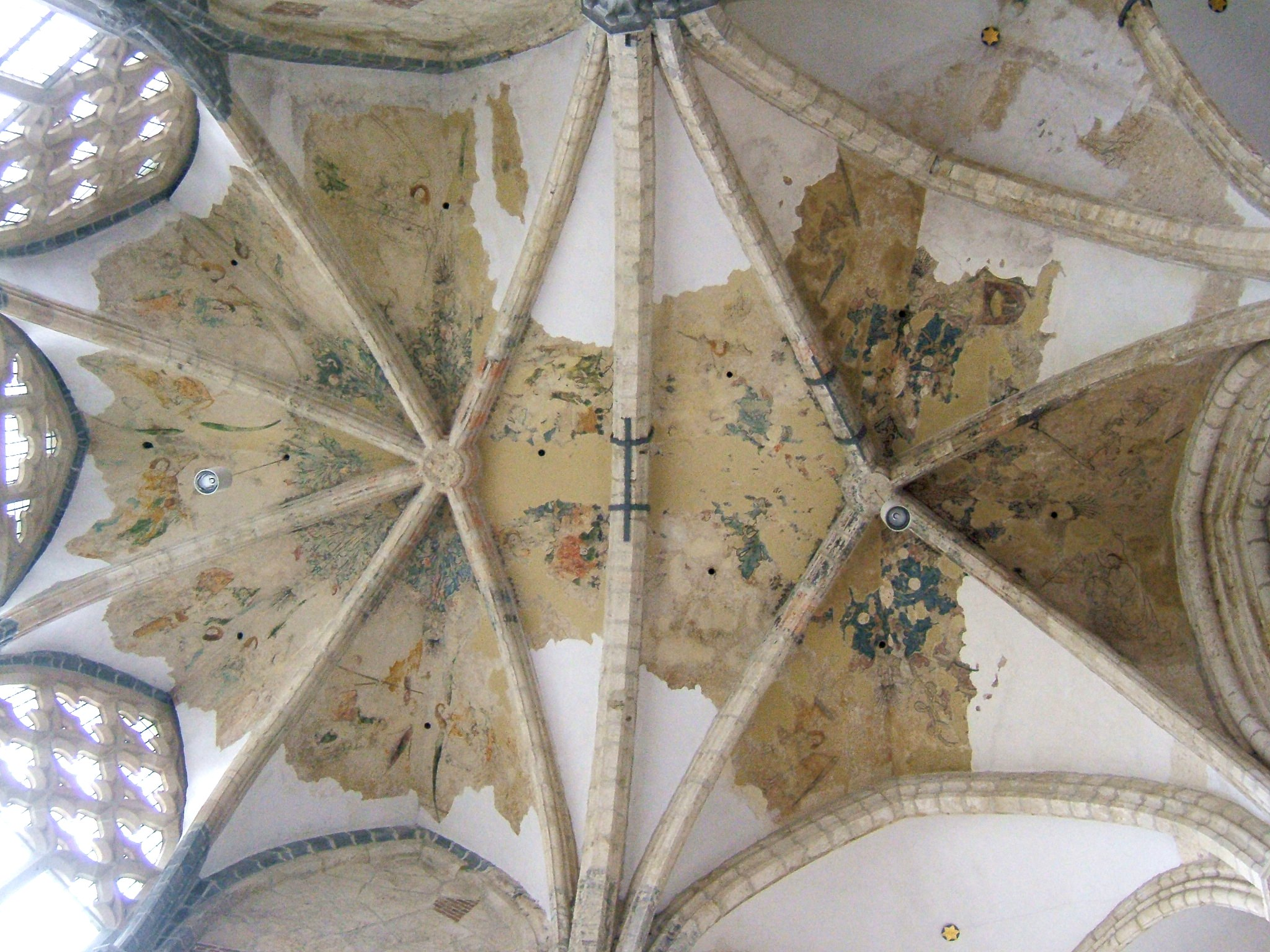
Rib vault of church Sint-Niklaaskerk in Ghent, Belgium

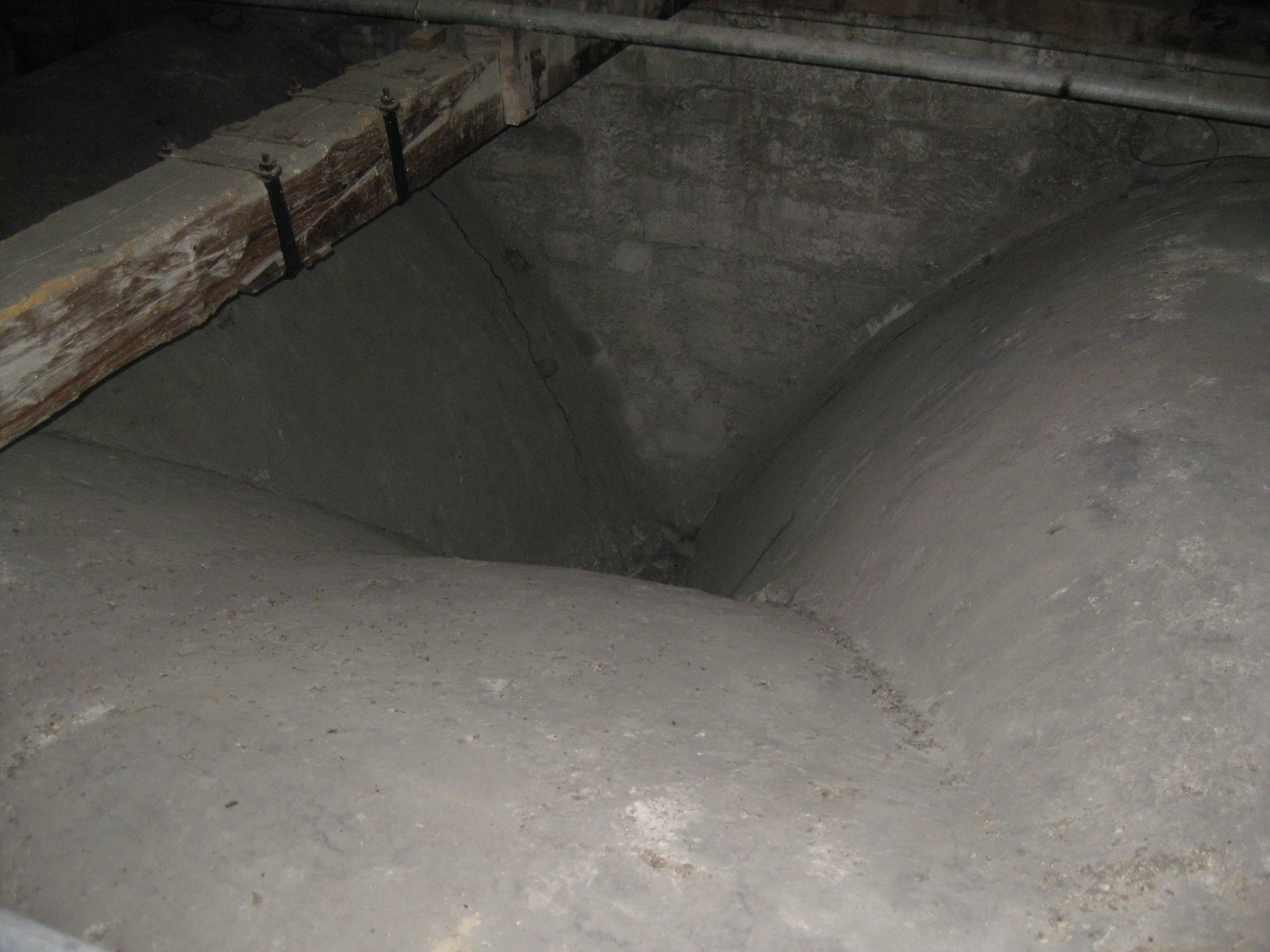
Top of the rib-vaulted ceiling over the nave of Salisbury Cathedral

The first introduction of the pointed arch rib took place at Cefalù Cathedral and pre-dated the abbey of Saint-Denis. Whilst the pointed rib-arch is often seen as an identifier for Gothic architecture, Cefalù is a Romanesque cathedral whose masons experimented with the possibility of Gothic rib-arches before it was widely adopted by western church architecture. Besides Cefalù Cathedral, the introduction of the pointed arch rib would seem to have taken place in the choir aisles of the abbey of Saint-Denis, near Paris, built by the abbot Suger in 1135. It was in the church at Vezelay (1140) that it was extended to the square bay of the porch. As has been pointed out, the aisles had already in the early Christian churches been covered over with groined vaults, the only advance made in the later developments being the introduction of transverse ribs' dividing the bays into square compartments. In the 12th century the first attempts were made to vault over the naves, which were twice the width of the aisles, so it became necessary to include two bays of the aisles to form one rectangular bay in the nave (although this is often mistaken as square). It followed that every alternate pier served no purpose, so far as the support of the nave vault was concerned, and this would seem to have suggested an alternative to provide a supplementary rib across the church and between the transverse ribs. This resulted in what is known as a sexpartite, or six-celled vault, of which one of the earliest examples is found in the Abbaye-aux-Hommes at Caen. This church, built by William the Conqueror, was originally constructed to carry a timber roof only, but nearly a century later the upper part of the nave walls were partly rebuilt, in order that it might be covered with a vault. The immense size, however, of the square vault over the nave necessitated some additional support, so that an intermediate rib was thrown across the church, dividing the square compartment into six cells, and called the sexpartite vault The intermediate rib, however, had the disadvantage of partially obscuring one side of the clerestory windows, and it threw unequal weights on the alternate piers, so that in the cathedral of Soissons (1205) a quadripartite or four-celled vault was introduced, the width of each bay being half the span of the nave, and corresponding therefore with the aisle piers. To this there are some exceptions, in Sant' Ambrogio, Milan, and San Michele, Pavia (the original vault), and in the cathedrals of Speyer, Mainz and Worms, where the quadripartite vaults are nearly square, the intermediate piers of the aisles being of much smaller dimensions. In England sexpartite vaults exist at Canterbury (1175) (set out by William of Sens), Rochester (1200), Lincoln (1215), Durham (east transept), and St. Faith's Chapel, Westminster Abbey.

In the earlier stage of rib vaulting, the arched ribs consisted of independent or separate voussoirs down to the springing; the difficulty, however, of working the ribs separately led to two other important changes: (1) the lower part of the transverse diagonal and wall ribs were all worked out of one stone; and (2) the lower horizontal, constituting what is known as the tas-de-charge or solid springer. The tas-de-charge, or solid springer, had two advantages: (1) it enabled the stone courses to run straight through the wall, to bond the whole together much better; and (2) it lessened the span of the vault, which then required a centring of smaller dimensions. As soon as the ribs were completed, the web or stone shell of the vault was laid on them. In some English work each course of stone was of uniform height from one side to the other; but, as the diagonal rib was longer than either the transverse or wall rib, the courses dipped towards the former, and at the apex of the vault were cut to fit one another. In the early English Gothic period, in consequence of the great span of the vault and the very slight rise or curvature of the web, it was thought better to simplify the construction of the web by introducing intermediate ribs between the wall rib and the diagonal rib and between the diagonal and the transverse ribs; and in order to meet the thrust of these intermediate ribs a ridge rib was required, and the prolongation of this rib to the wall rib hid the junction of the web at the summit, which was not always very sightly, and constituted the ridge rib. In France, on the other hand, the web courses were always laid horizontally, and they are therefore of unequal height, increasing towards the diagonal rib. Each course also was given a slight rise in the centre, so as to increase its strength; this enabled the French masons to dispense with the intermediate rib, which was not introduced by them till the 15th century, and then more as a decorative than a constructive feature, as the domical form given to the French web rendered unnecessary the ridge rib, which, with some few exceptions, exists only in England. In both English and French vaulting centring was rarely required for the building of the web, a template (fr. cerce) being employed to support the stones of each ring until it was complete. In Italy, Germany and Spain the French method of building the web was adopted, with horizontal courses and a domical form. Sometimes, in the case of comparatively narrow compartments, and more especially in clerestories, the wall rib was stilted, and this caused a peculiar twisting of the web, where the springing of the wall rib is at K: to these twisted surfaces the term ploughshare vaulting is given.

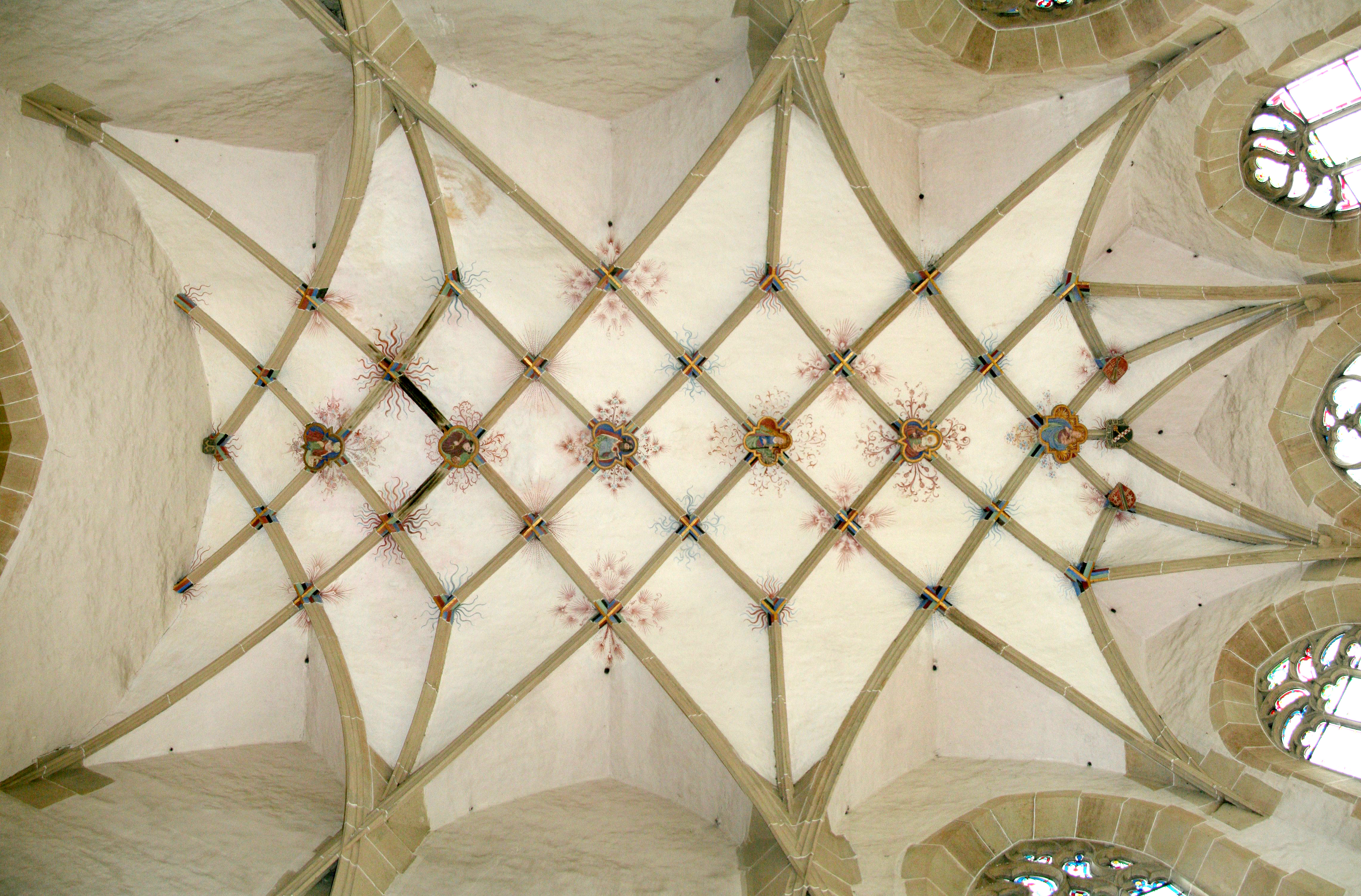
Rib-vault ceiling, with Lierne ribs, of the Liebfrauenkirche, Mühlacker 1482

One of the earliest examples of the introduction of the intermediate rib is found in the nave of Lincoln Cathedral, and there the ridge rib is not carried to the wall rib. It was soon found, however, that the construction of the web was much facilitated by additional tierceron ribs, and consequently there was a tendency to increase their number, so that in the nave of Exeter Cathedral three intermediate ribs were provided between the wall rib and the diagonal rib. To mask the junction of the various ribs, their intersections were ornamented with richly carved bosses, and this practice increased on the introduction of another short rib, known as the lierne, a term in France given to the ridge rib. Lierne ribs are short ribs crossing between the main ribs, and were employed chiefly as decorative features, as, for instance, in the Liebfrauenkirche (1482) of Mühlacker, Germany. One of the best examples of Lierne ribs exists in the vault of the oriel window of Crosby Hall, London. The tendency to increase the number of ribs led to singular results in some cases, as in the choir of Gloucester Cathedral, where the ordinary diagonal ribs become mere ornamental mouldings on the surface of an intersected pointed barrel vault, and again in the cloisters, where the introduction of the fan vault, forming a concave-sided conoid, returned to the principles of the Roman geometrical vault. This is further shown in the construction of these fan vaults, for although in the earliest examples each of the ribs above the tas-de-charge was an independent feature, eventually it was found easier to carve them and the web out of the solid stone, so that the rib and web were purely decorative and had no constructional or independent functions.

In France, Germany, and Spain the multiplication of ribs in the 15th century led to decorative vaults of various kinds, but with some singular modifications. Thus, in Germany, recognizing that the rib was no longer a necessary constructive feature, they cut it off abruptly, leaving a stump only; in France, on the other hand, they gave still more importance to the rib, by making it of greater depth, piercing it with tracery and hanging pendants from it, and the web became a horizontal stone paving laid on the top of these decorated vertical webs.

=== Fan vault ===
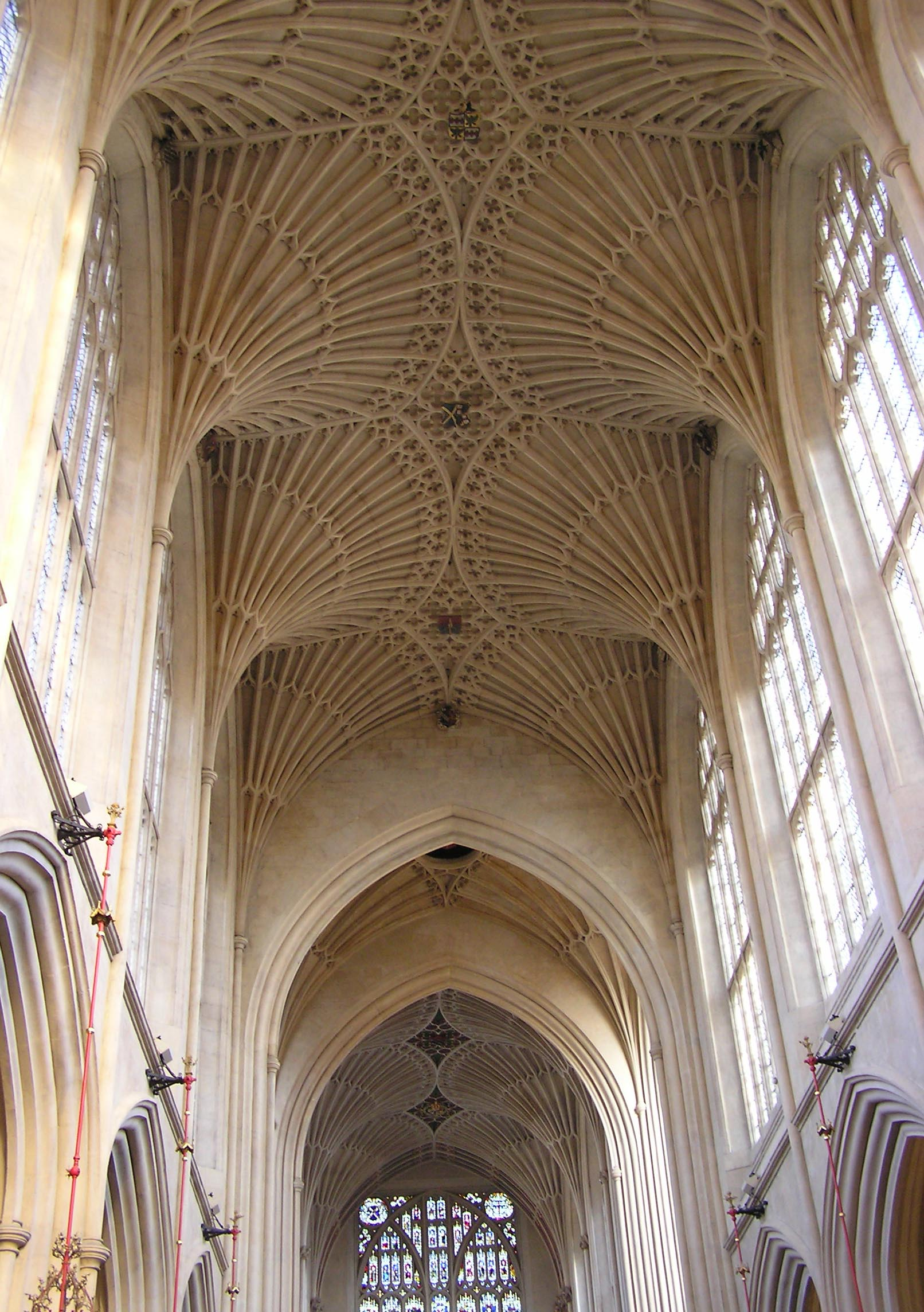
Fan vaulting over the nave at Bath Abbey, Bath, England

This form of vaulting is found in English late Gothic in which the vault is constructed as a single surface of dressed stones, with the ribs radiating from the springing point resembling a fan, and the resulting conoid forming an ornamental network of blind tracery.

The fan vault would seem to have owed its origin to the employment of centerings of one curve for all the ribs, instead of having separate centerings for the transverse, diagonal wall and intermediate ribs; it was facilitated also by the introduction of the four-centred arch, because the lower portion of the arch formed part of the fan, or conoid, and the upper part could be extended at pleasure with a greater radius across the vault. These ribs were often cut from the same stones as the webs, with the entire vault being treated as a single jointed surface covered in interlocking tracery.

The earliest example is perhaps the east walk of the cloister at Gloucester, with its surface consisting of intricately decorated panels of stonework forming conical structures that rise from the springers of the vault. In later examples, as in King's College Chapel, Cambridge, on account of the great dimensions of the vault, it was found necessary to introduce transverse ribs, which were required to give greater strength. Similar transverse ribs are found in Henry VII's Chapel at Westminster Abbey, where the complete conoid is detached and treated as a pendant.

One good example of the fan vault is that over the staircase leading to the hall of Christ Church, Oxford, where the complete conoid is displayed in its centre carried on a central column. This vault, not built until 1640, is an example of traditional workmanship, probably in Oxford transmitted in consequence of the late vaulting of the entrance gateways to the colleges. Fan vaulting is peculiar to England, the only example approaching it in France being the pendant of the Lady-chapel at Caudebec-en-Caux, in Normandy.

=== Renaissance vaulting ===
The Renaissance saw the development of vaults constructed without expensive centring, such as the dome of Florence Cathedral, which used an interlocking structure of ribs and herringbone brickwork to be self-supporting during its construction. However, other vaults were heavier than Gothic vaults, as the Roman barrel and groin forms were revived for aesthetic reasons, despite being less structurally efficient.

Internal and external roofs

The Gothic Notre-Dame de Paris was built with a peaked timber roof (red) protecting its masonry nave vault (blue).

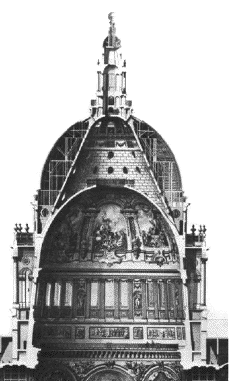
Cross-section of the dome of St. Paul's, London

Whereas Roman vaults, like that of the Pantheon, and Byzantine vaults, like that at Hagia Sophia, were not protected from above (i.e. the vault from the inside was the same that one saw from the outside), the European architects of the Middle Ages protected their vaults with wooden roofs. In other words, one will not see a Gothic vault from the outside. The reasons for this development are hypothetical, but the fact that the roofed basilica form preceded the era when vaults begin to be made is certainly to be taken into consideration. In other words, the traditional image of a roof took precedence over the vault.

The separation between interior and exterior – and between structure and image – was to be developed very purposefully in the Renaissance and beyond, especially once the dome became reinstated in the Western tradition as a key element in church design. For example, Michelangelo's dome for St. Peter's Basilica in Vatican City (as redesigned by Giacomo della Porta between 1585 and 1590) comprises two domes, of which, only the inner is structural. Baltasar Neumann, in his baroque churches, perfected light-weight plaster vaults supported by wooden frames. These vaults, which exerted no lateral pressures, were perfectly suited for elaborate ceiling frescoes. In St Paul's Cathedral in London there is a highly complex system of vaults and faux-vaults. The dome that one sees from the outside is not a vault, but a relatively light-weight wooden-framed structure resting on an invisible – and for its age highly original – catenary vault of brick, below which is another dome, (the dome that one sees from the inside), but of plaster supported by a wood frame. From the inside, one can easily assume that one is looking at the same vault that one sees from the outside.

=== Islamic vaulting ===
The Muqarnas is a form of vaulting common in Islamic architecture.

==== India ====
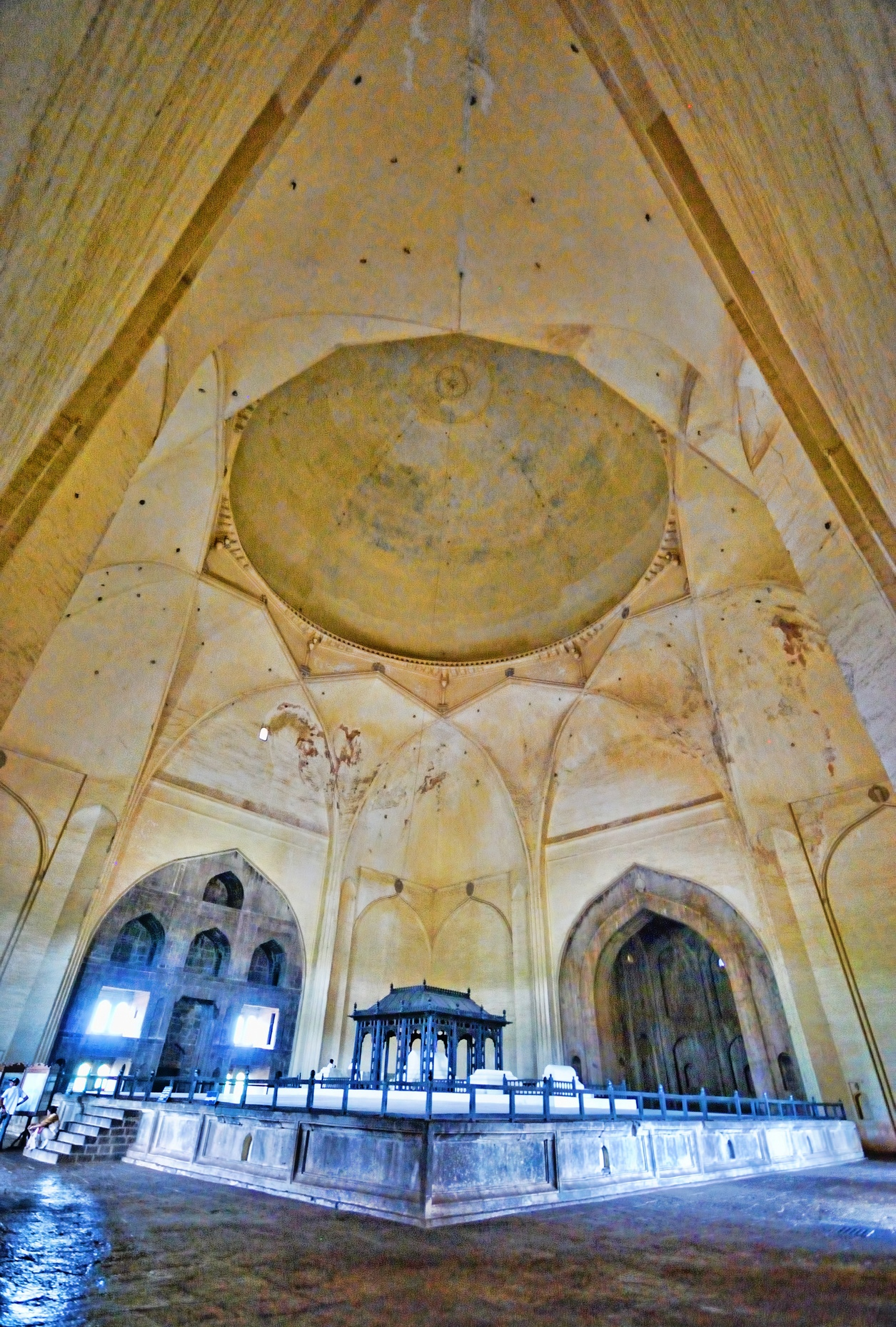
Vaults and dome of the Gol Gumbaz

There are two distinctive "other ribbed vaults" (called "Karbandi" in Persian) in India which form no part of the development of European vaults, but have some unusual features; one carries the central dome of the Jumma Musjid at Bijapur (A.D. 1559), and the other is Gol Gumbaz, the tomb of Muhammad Adil Shah II (1626–1660) in the same town. The vault of the latter was constructed over a hall 135 feet (41 m) square, to carry a hemispherical dome. The ribs, instead of being carried across the angles only, thus giving an octagonal base for the dome, are carried across to the further pier of the octagon and consequently intersect one another, reducing the central opening to 97 feet (30 m) in diameter, and, by the weight of the masonry they carry, serving as counterpoise to the thrust of the dome, which is set back to leave a passage about 12 feet (3.7 m) wide round the interior. The internal diameter of the dome is 124 feet (38 m), its height 175 feet (53 m) and the ribs struck from four centres have their springing 57 feet (17 m) from the floor of the hall. The Jumma Musjid dome was of smaller dimensions, on a square of 70 feet (21 m) with a diameter of 57 feet (17 m), and was carried on piers only instead of immensely thick walls as in the tomb; but any thrust which might exist was counteracted by its transmission across aisles to the outer wall.

=== Modern vaults ===
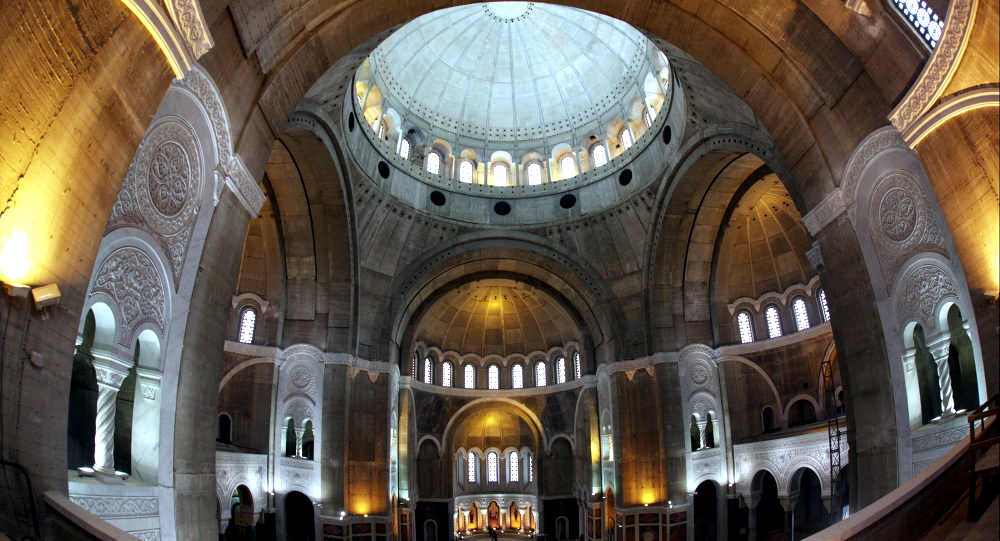
Neobyzantine vaults in Saint Sava. The vaults, 37.7 m high and 24 m wide are designed as concrete boxes. They were prefabricated and lifted with chains to their shown positions.

==== Hyperbolic paraboloids ====
The 20th century saw great advances in reinforced concrete design. The advent of shell construction and the better mathematical understanding of hyperbolic paraboloids allowed very thin, strong vaults to be constructed with previously unseen shapes. The vaults in the Church of Saint Sava are made of prefabricated concrete boxes. They were built on the ground and lifted to 40 m on chains.

==== Vegetal vault ====
When made by plants or trees, either artificially or grown on purpose by humans, structures of this type are called tree tunnels.

== See also ==
- Concrete shell
- Star-painted ceiling
- Tensile structure
