= Lierne (vault) =

Ornamental vaulting rib in Gothic architecture

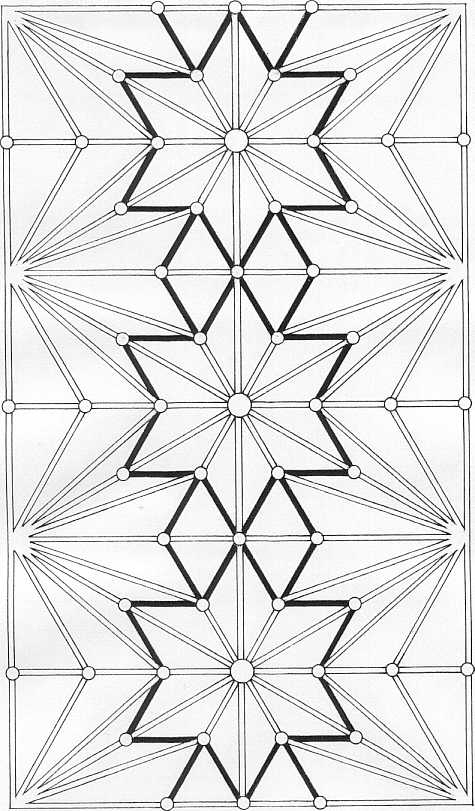
Plan of lierne vault at Ely Cathedral, (with liernes shaded black)

In Gothic architecture, a lierne is a tertiary rib connecting one rib of a rib vault to another, as opposed to connecting to a springer, or to the central boss. The resulting construction is called a lierne vault or stellar vault (named after the star shape generated by connecting liernes). The term lierne comes from the French lier (to bind).

In England, the lierne came into use during the 14th-century Decorated period of architecture. Gloucester Cathedral offers a good example of lierne vaulting. In France, examples occur in Flamboyant architecture, such as in the Church of Saint-Pierre in Caen.

The vault-plan diagram of Ely Cathedral Choir shows the ribs as double lines. The main longitudinal ridge rib (middle vertical lines) and transverse ridge ribs (alternate horizontal lines) intersect each other at the central bosses (large circles). The longitudinal ridge rib runs down the centre of the choir, and the transverse ridge ribs span from the apex of each window at the sides of the choir. Arched diagonal ribs span from piers between the windows, from springers to the central bosses, and arched transverse ribs (alternate horizontal lines) span from the springers to the main longitudinal ridge rib. Secondary arched ribs going along the diagonals, called tiercerons, span from the springers to the transverse ridge ribs. Liernes (shaded black) span between the other ribs, forming intricate patterning.

Note: in French terminology relating to architecture, a lierne is a ridge rib, and hence has a different meaning.

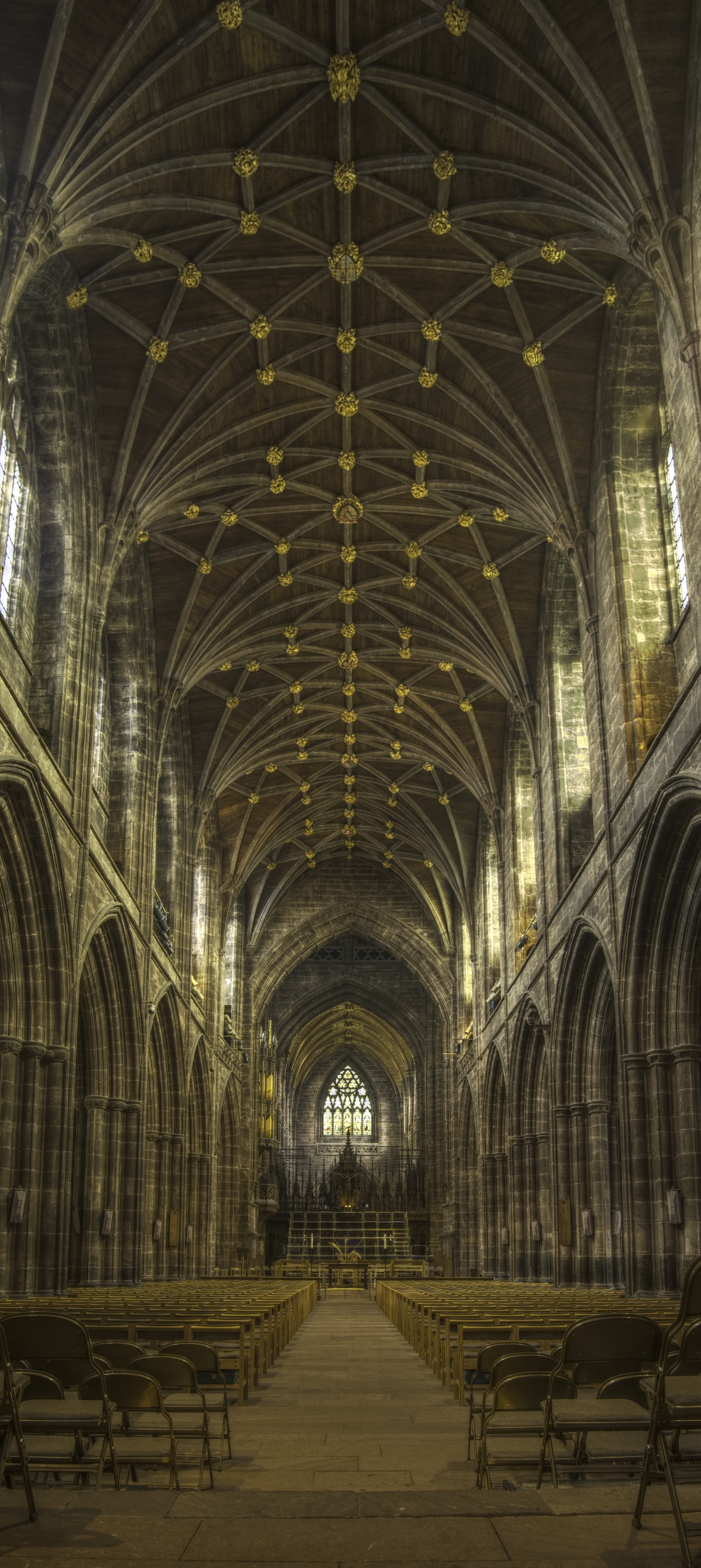
Lierne vault in the nave of Chester Cathedral

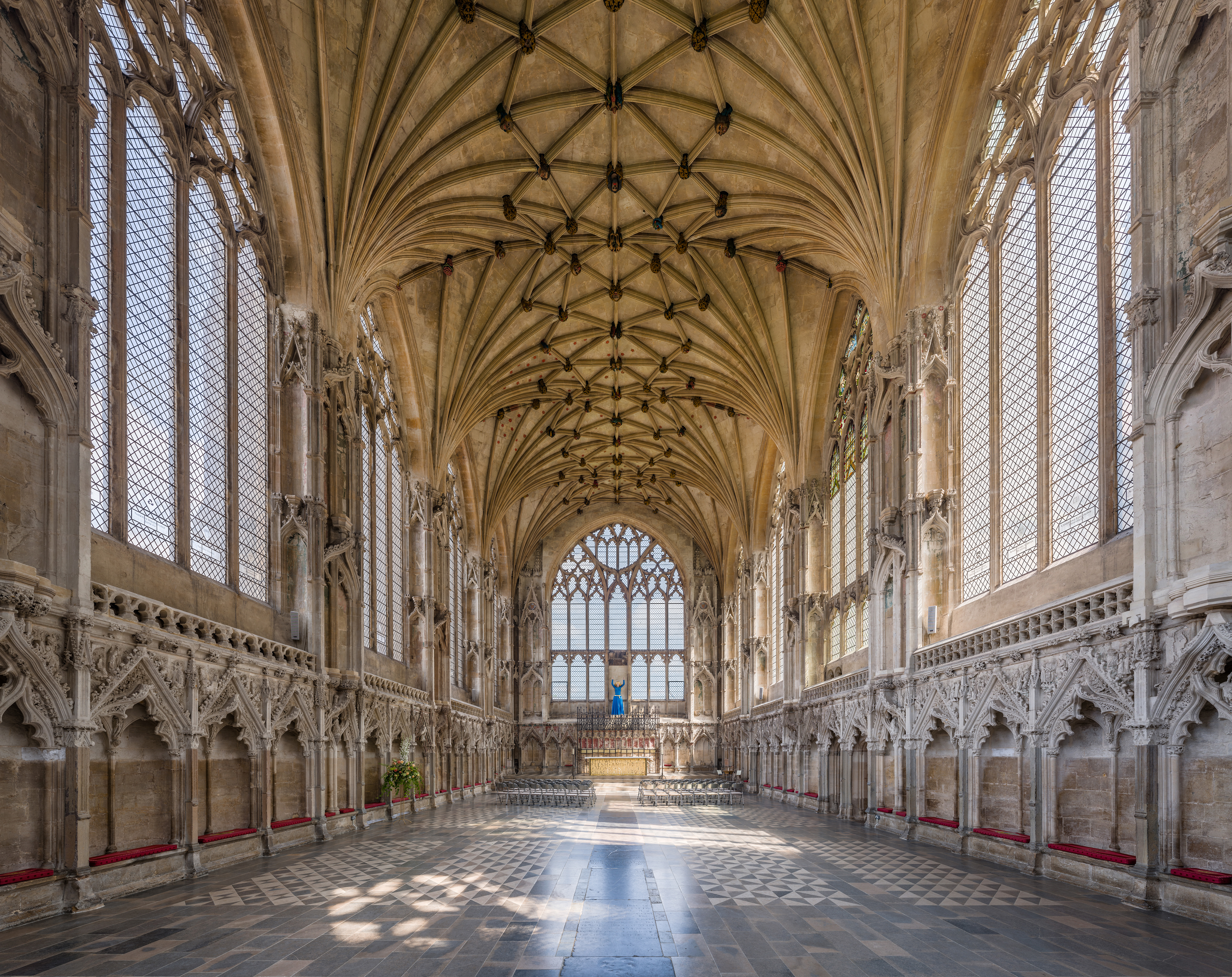
Lady chapel of Ely Cathedral in Ely, Cambridgeshire

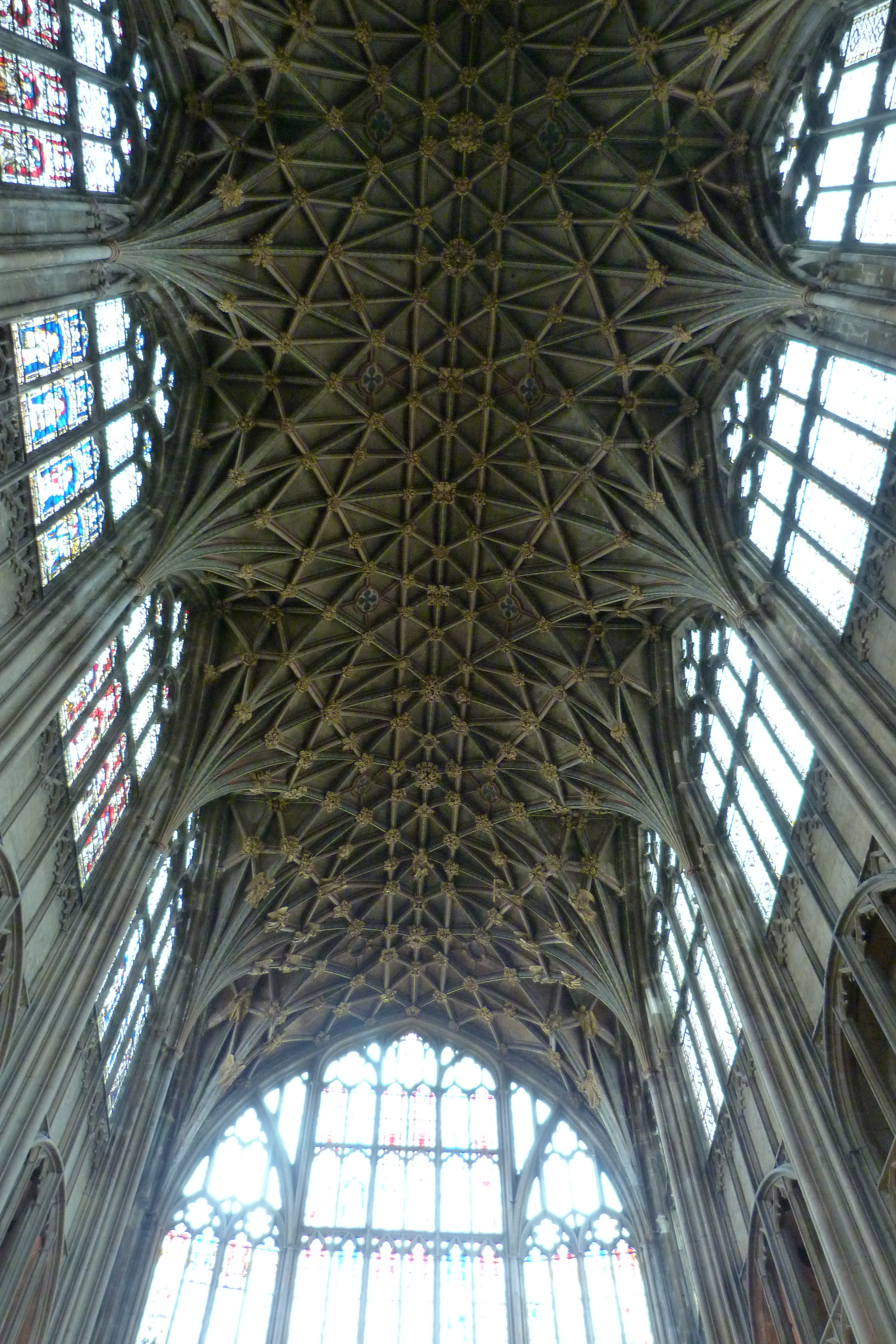
Gloucester Cathedral east end with perpendicular lierne vaulting

== See also ==
- Vault
- List of architectural vaults
