= Sexpartite vault =

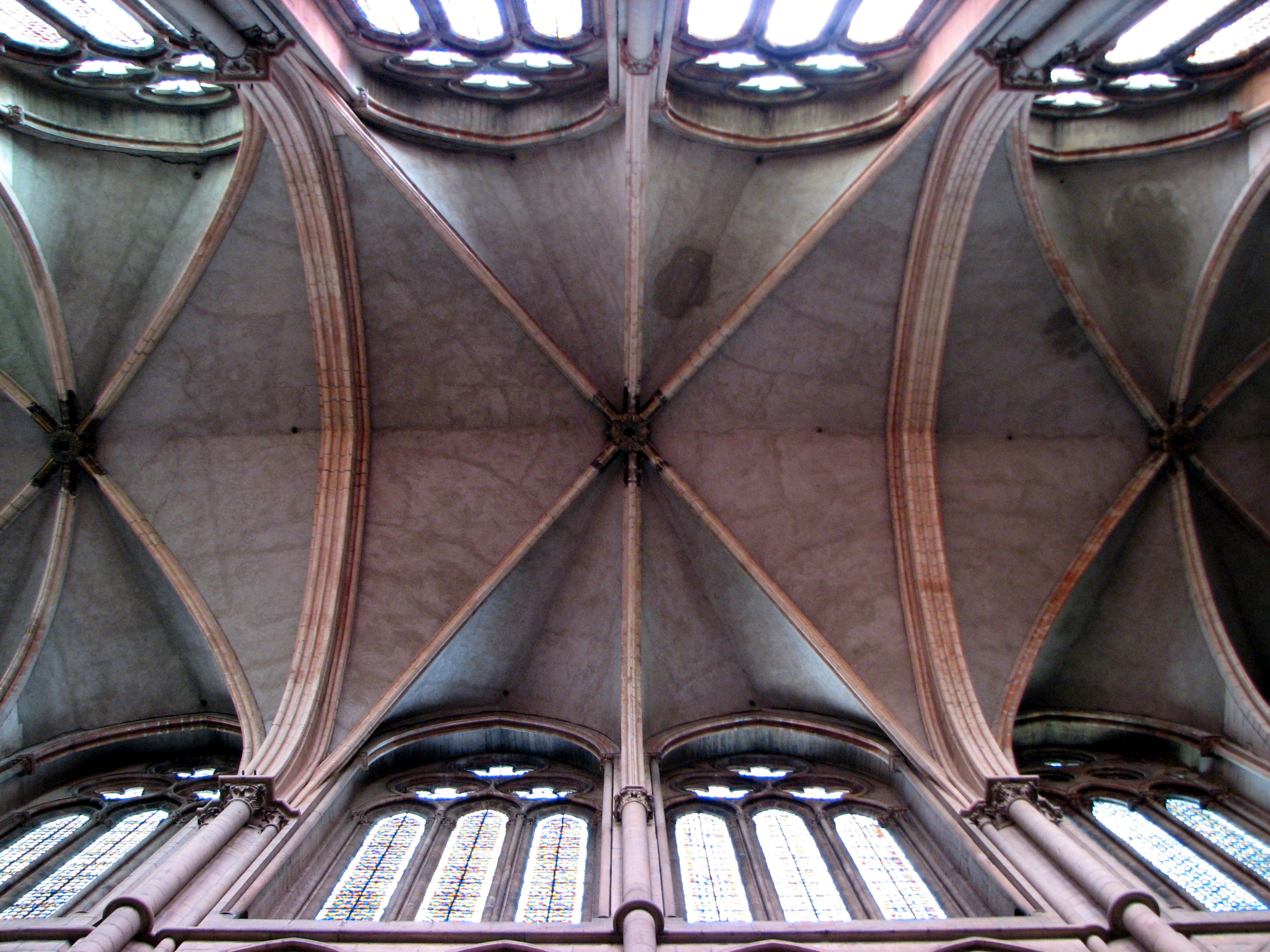
Sexpartite vaulting, Lyon Cathedral

In architecture, a sexpartite vault is a rib vault divided into six bays by two diagonal ribs and three transverse ribs.

The principal examples are those in the Abbaye-aux-Hommes and Abbaye-aux-Dames at Caen (which were probably the earliest examples of a construction now looked upon as transitional), Notre-Dame de Paris, and the cathedrals of Bourges, Laon, Senlis and Sens; from the latter cathedral the sexpartite vault was brought by William of Sens to Canterbury, and it is afterwards found at Lincoln and in St Faith's Chapel, Westminster Abbey.

== See also ==
- List of architectural vaults
- Cathedral architecture
