= Arc formeret =

Arch or rib at the junction of a vault and a wall

Wall rib / formeret engaging a wall (left) and framing a window (right, compound)

An arc formeret, or formeret (also known as wall rib), is an arch or rib at the junction of a vault and a wall. In Gothic vaulting, the term also applies to the corresponding rib beside the arcade separating a nave from an aisle.

== Etymology ==
The term formeret is borrowed from French and derives from Middle French forme, meaning "form" or "large window in a church".

== Position and function ==
Wall rib (left) and arc formeret (right) in a cloister

A formeret runs along the side of a vaulted bay, parallel to the principal axis of the vault. It is distinguished from a transverse arch, or arc doubleau, which runs across the vaulted space.

A vault may meet a wall without a projecting arch or moulded rib. Where a wall rib is present, it supports the edge of the vault and helps define the divisions of the wall below. Such ribs are generally partly supported by, or embedded in, the wall.

In his account of medieval French construction, Eugène Viollet-le-Duc described formerets as engaged in the wall face, with a profile corresponding to half that of a diagonal rib or transverse arch. They project sufficiently to receive the masonry of the vault. He noted that, from the 13th century, formerets often extended through the wall, acting as relieving arches above windows and forming archivolts on the exterior.

== German terminology ==
The German term Schildbogen can refer to the curved boundary where a vault meets a wall, as well as to an arch or rib beneath that junction. A rib in this position is also called a Schildrippe, Schildbogenrippe or Wandrippe; an arch may be called a Schildgurt or Wandgurt.

The architectural historian Hans Sedlmayr described the Schildbogen as a lateral counterpart to a transverse arch and considered it an essential element in the development of the canopy formed by a rib vault in cathedral architecture.

== See also ==
- Groin vault
- Rib vault
