= Rib (architecture) =

Structural or decorative member of a vault

Ribs beneath the vaults of Saint-Pierre-Saint-Paul Church, Ablis

In architecture, a rib is a structural or decorative member of a vault, usually forming a masonry arch. Ribs commonly project below the vault's surface and have a moulded profile. In a rib vault, they form a framework between the panels of masonry known as the webs. Although particularly associated with Gothic architecture, ribs also occur in other architectural traditions. Their functions include supporting the vault, assisting its construction and decorating its surface.

Ribbed vaulting was used before the emergence of Gothic architecture. The tenth-century extension of the Great Mosque of Córdoba under al-Hakam II includes vaults formed by intersecting arches. In medieval western Europe, Durham Cathedral was an early example of stone ribbed vaulting combined with pointed arches. The choir of the Basilica of Saint-Denis, consecrated in 1144, helped establish ribbed vaulting as a characteristic feature of Gothic architecture.

In late Gothic architecture, additional ribs formed increasingly elaborate decorative patterns, and some were used primarily for ornament.

== Form and terminology ==

Ribs are distinguished by their position within a vault and by the pattern they form. The principal types include:

- Diagonal ribs (also known as groin ribs, following the groin formed at the intersection of vault surfaces), which cross a bay diagonally.
- Transverse ribs, which follow the arches across the width of a vaulted nave or aisle, perpendicular to its longitudinal axis.
- Longitudinal wall ribs (also called formerets), which follow the junction between a vault and a wall. The term arc formeret also applies to the corresponding rib beside an arcade between a nave and an aisle.
- Ridge ribs, which follow the crown of a vault; a longitudinal ridge rib runs along its length.
- Tiercerons, additional ribs that rise from the same springing points as the principal ribs and meet ridge ribs.
- Liernes, shorter ribs connecting other ribs, which do not rise from the principal springing points. In French architectural terminology, lierne usually refers to a ridge rib.

The arrangement of ribs can produce simple crossed patterns, star patterns or more elaborate networks. In late Gothic vaults, ribs could also curve in plan or extend away from the vault surface.

The visible profile forms only part of a rib's cross-section. Ribs may also be embedded within the vault or placed above its shell. Early forms included ribs of square section, as at San Baudelio de Berlanga. More elaborate profiles incorporated chamfers, concave hollows and rounded mouldings; one form has a pear-shaped cross-section, known in German as a Birnstab.

The English fan vault is a distinct form, illustrated by the vault of King's College Chapel, Cambridge, completed in 1515, and the Henry VII Chapel at Westminster Abbey, whose vault has carved pendants. In this design, all ribs are of the same shape and equally spaced, forming a conical-like surface.

== Construction and structural role ==
In masonry rib vaults, the ribs and the intervening webs are built as distinct elements. The ribs can carry loads towards the vault's supports, allowing the webbing between them to be thinner and lighter. In Gothic buildings, ribbed vaulting was used together with buttresses and flying buttresses to support high interiors with large window openings. The buttresses resist the outward thrust of the vault.

The ribs are assembled on temporary timber supports called centring. Their wedge-shaped stones, or voussoirs, are set in mortar, with bosses at intersections. Once the ribs have been assembled, the masonry webs are laid between them. A completed arched rib can support its own weight before the webbing is added. Construction practices varied, however: the ribs, bosses and webs were not laid in an identical sequence at every site.

In medieval vault design, individual rib curves were set out at full scale on stone or plaster tracing floors. Their geometry depended on factors such as the span, springing point, apex height and radius of curvature. Using a common radius for several ribs could reduce the variety of stone components that masons needed to cut.

== See also ==
- Groin vault
- Ogive
- Pendant vault
