= Tierceron =

Type of vaulting rib

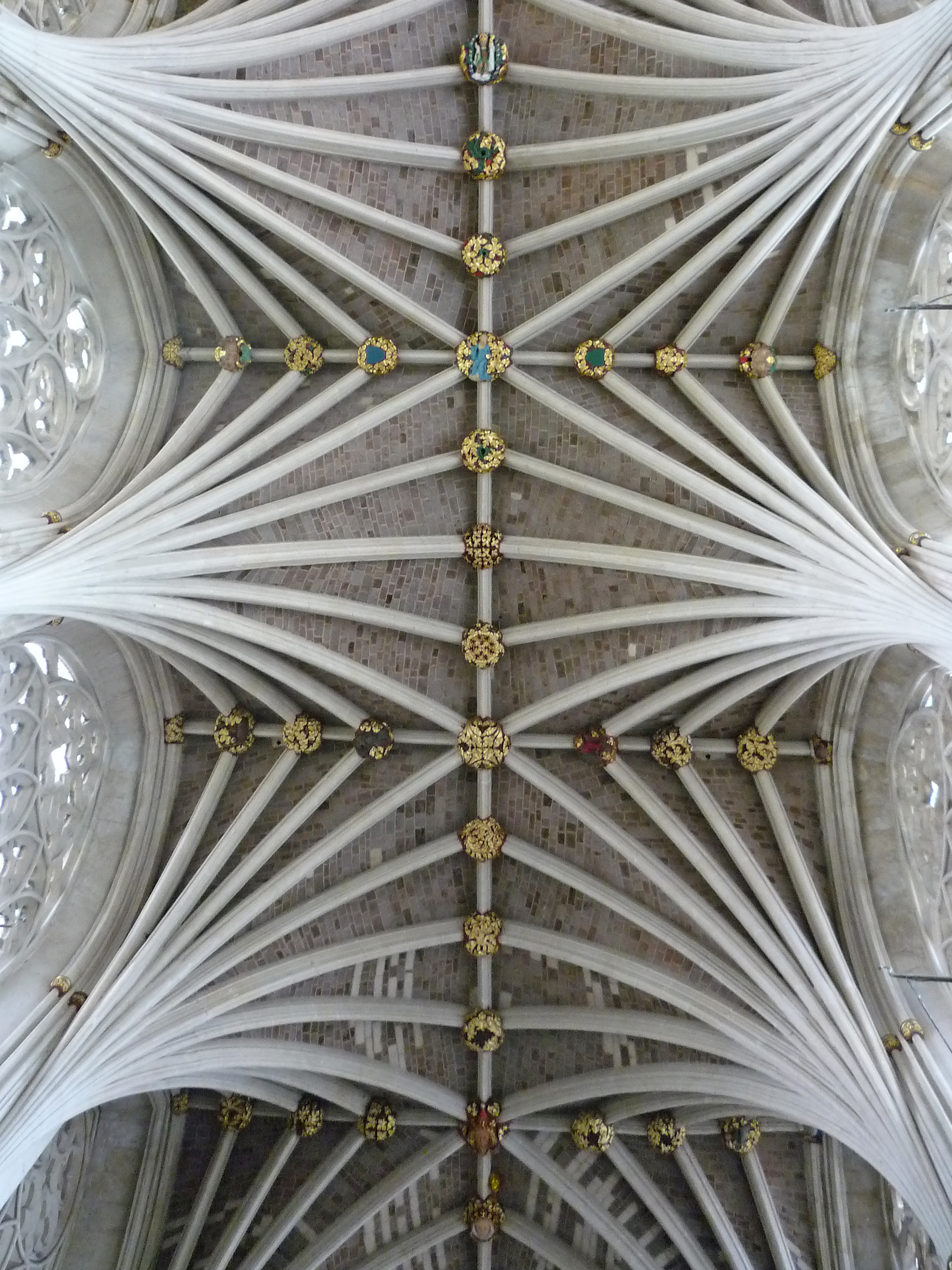
Tierceron vaulting at Exeter Cathedral

A tierceron is a rib in a Gothic rib vault that runs from the springing point to a point on the ridge other than the central boss or keystone. When used over multiple bays of a building, this gives the effect of spreading palm trees.

== Invention and examples ==
Tierceron vaulting was invented in England, probably at Lincoln Cathedral in the 1190s by Geoffrey de Noiers, as an elaboration of the quadripartite vault more common in France. It was a feature of more elaborate Early English Gothic churches, such as Lincoln Cathedral and the presbytery of Ely Cathedral.

Tierceron vaulting was also used at the Decorated Gothic Exeter Cathedral (begun in the 1270s), forming the longest unbroken Gothic vault in the world. After the 1290s, it was superseded by the more elaborate lierne vault, which has additional ribs that do not rise from the springing. However, some lierne vaults, such as those over Norwich Cathedral, still had tierceron ribs. In the late medieval Flamboyant period, tierceron vaults began to be used elsewhere in Europe, such as France, though Amiens Cathedral has an early French example of c. 1269. Though tierceron vaults were usually built of stone, they could also be made of timber, as in the transepts of Exeter Cathedral.

== Gallery ==
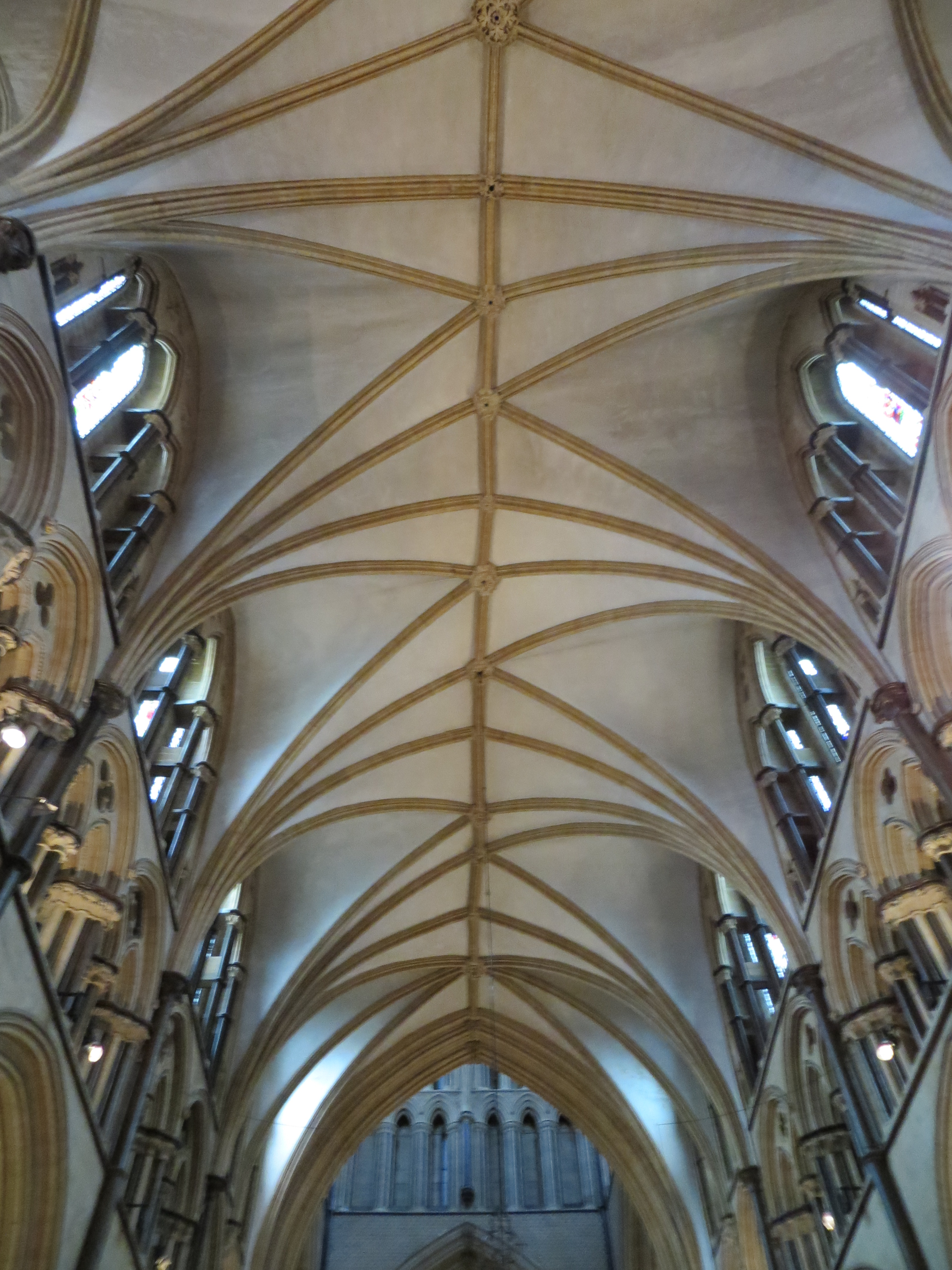
The early "crazy vault" at Lincoln Cathedral

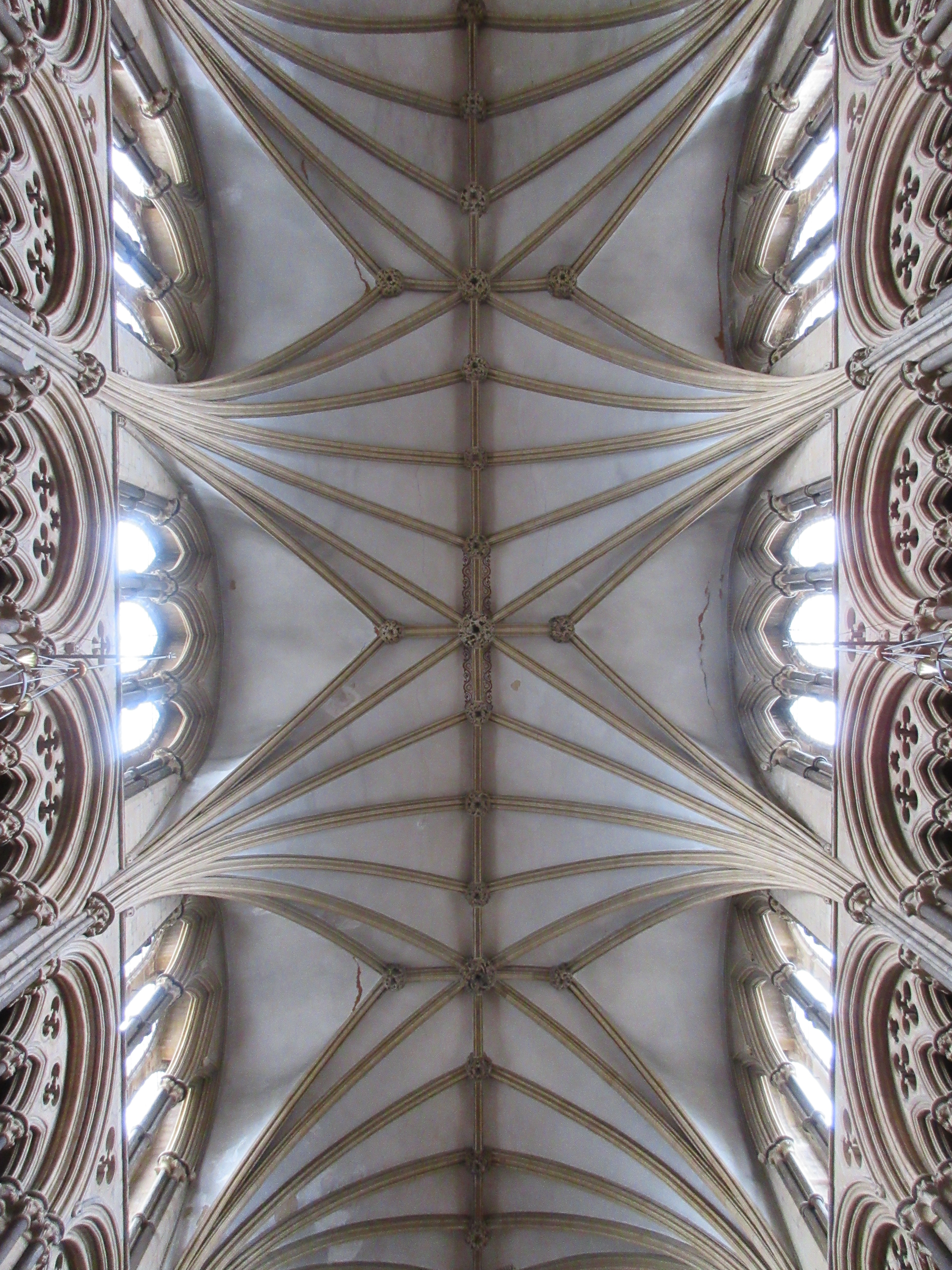
Tierceron vaulting over the nave of Lincoln Cathedral

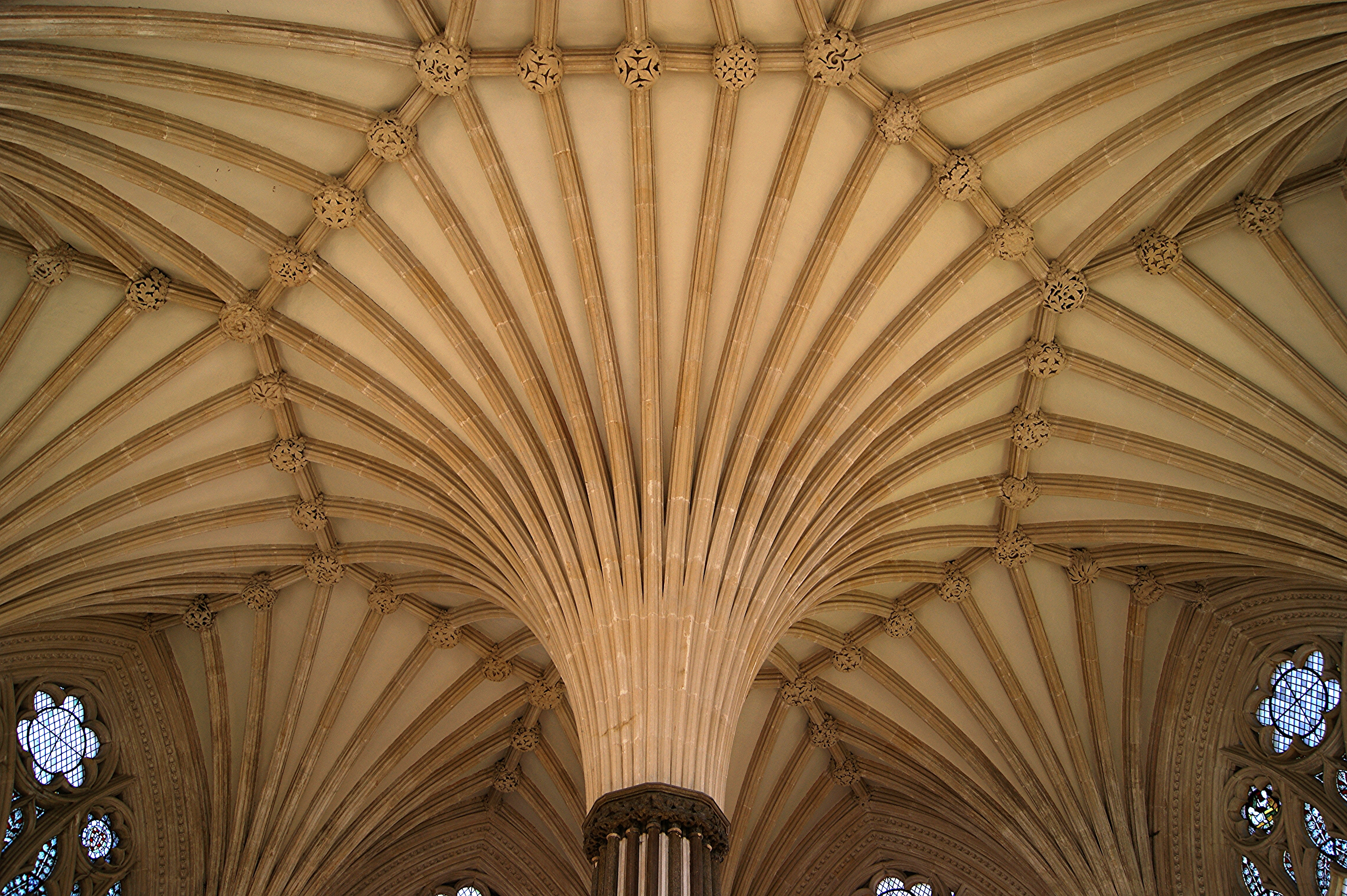
Palm tree–like tierceron vaulting over the chapter house of Wells Cathedral

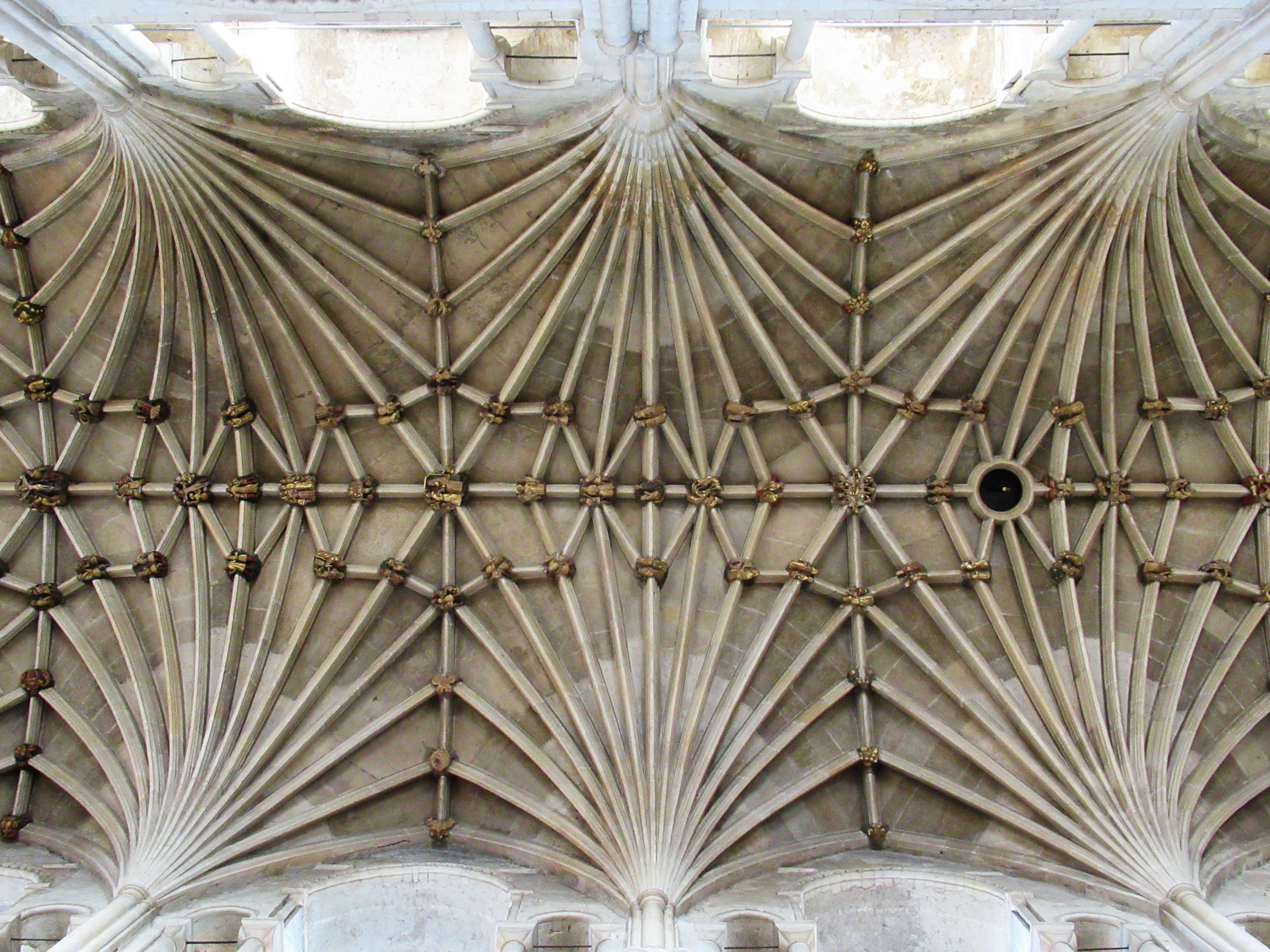
The 15th-century lierne vault at Norwich Cathedral uses tiercerons
