= Centring =

Type of falsework

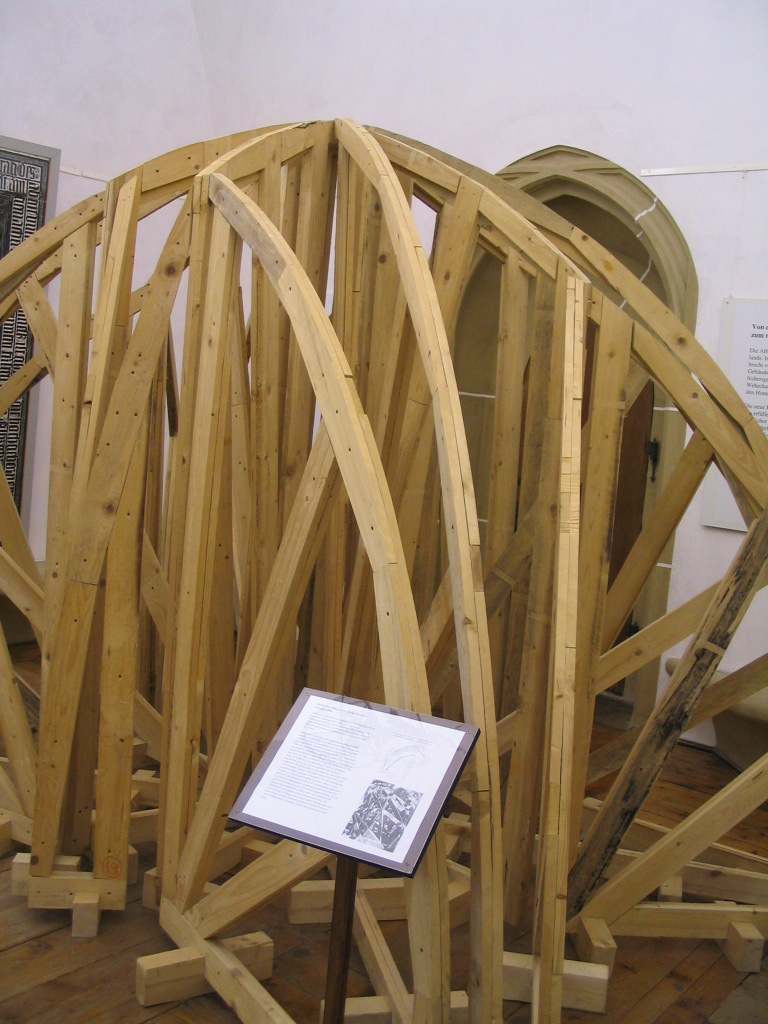
Model of centring for a ribbed dome structure at Albrechtsburg.

Centring, centre, centering, or center is a type of falsework: the temporary structure upon which the stones of an arch or vault are laid during construction. Until the keystone is inserted an arch has no strength and needs the centring to keep the voussoirs in their correct relative positions. A simple centring without a truss is called a common centring. A cross piece connecting centring frames is called a lag or bolst.

Centring is normally made of wood timbers, a relatively straightforward structure in a simple arch or vault; but with more complex shapes involving double curvature, such as a dome or the bottle-shaped flue in a Norman-period kitchen, clay or sand bound by a weak lime mortar would be used. Shaping could be done by eye, perhaps with the help of a template, then stones or bricks laid against it. On larger works like a 19th-century pottery kiln this was impractical. The structure would be built round a post acting as a datum, and each course of stonework would be set at a distance from the datum.

When the centring is removed (as in "striking the centring"), pointing and other finishing continues.

== Gallery ==
A simple arch centre suitable for single skin brickwork.

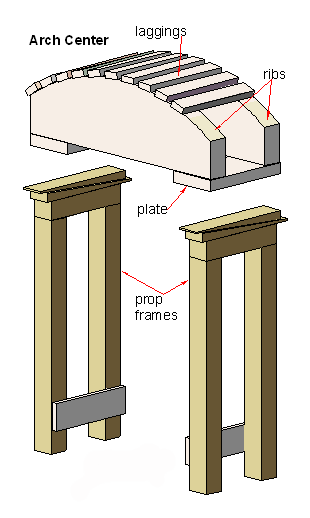
A centre for a flat segmental arch.

The centring for a semicircular arch.

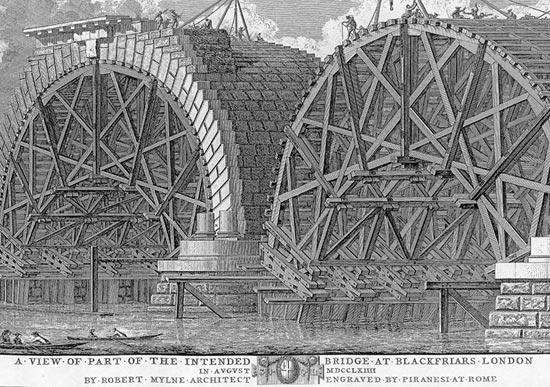
Centring of trusses, not common centring

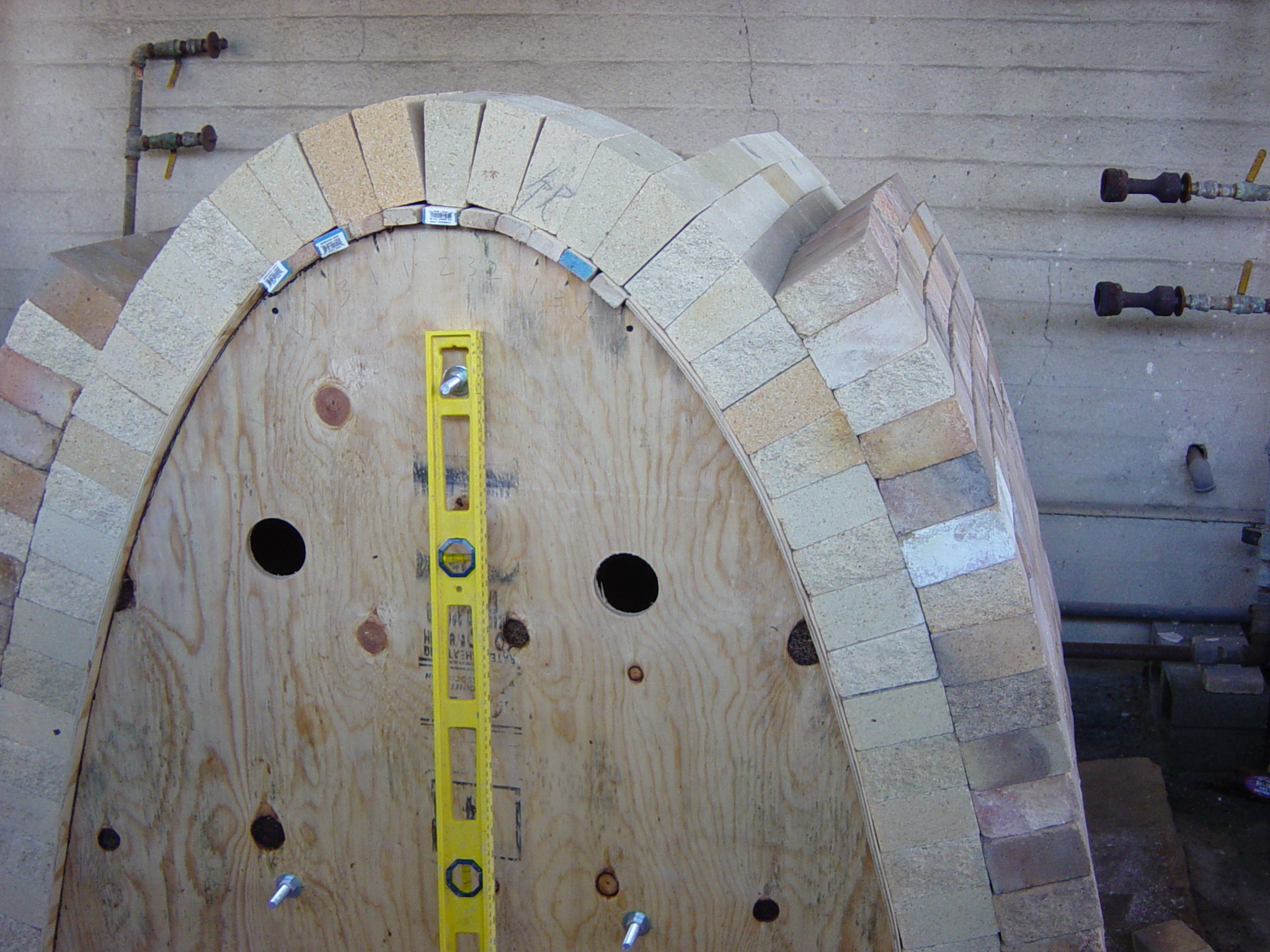
Catenary arch kiln under construction over centring
