= Springer (architecture) =

Lowest structural element of an arch

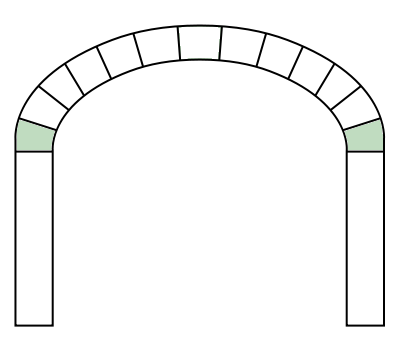

In architecture, a springer (sometimes springing) is the lowest voussoir (wedge-shaped structural element) on each side of an arch. Since it is the bottom-most element of the arch, it is where the arch support terminates at the respond. It rests on the impost or pier of the arch, that is, the topmost part of the abutment, from which the arch arises.

Usually, the springer is located at the bottom of an arch curve. The "delayed" springing (when the curvature starts noticeably above the support) is a trait of a stilted arch, common in Romanesque and Gothic architecture.

== Sources ==
- Jones, Tom Devonshire; Murray, Linda; Murray, Peter, eds. (2013). "springing". The Oxford Dictionary of Christian Art and Architecture (2nd ed.). Oxford University Press. ISBN 9780199680276.
- Calvo-López, José (2020). "Introduction". Stereotomy. Vol. 4. Cham: Springer International Publishing. pp. 1–41. doi:10.1007/978-3-030-43218-8_1. ISBN 978-3-030-43217-1.
