= Alternation of supports =

Feature of medieval architecture

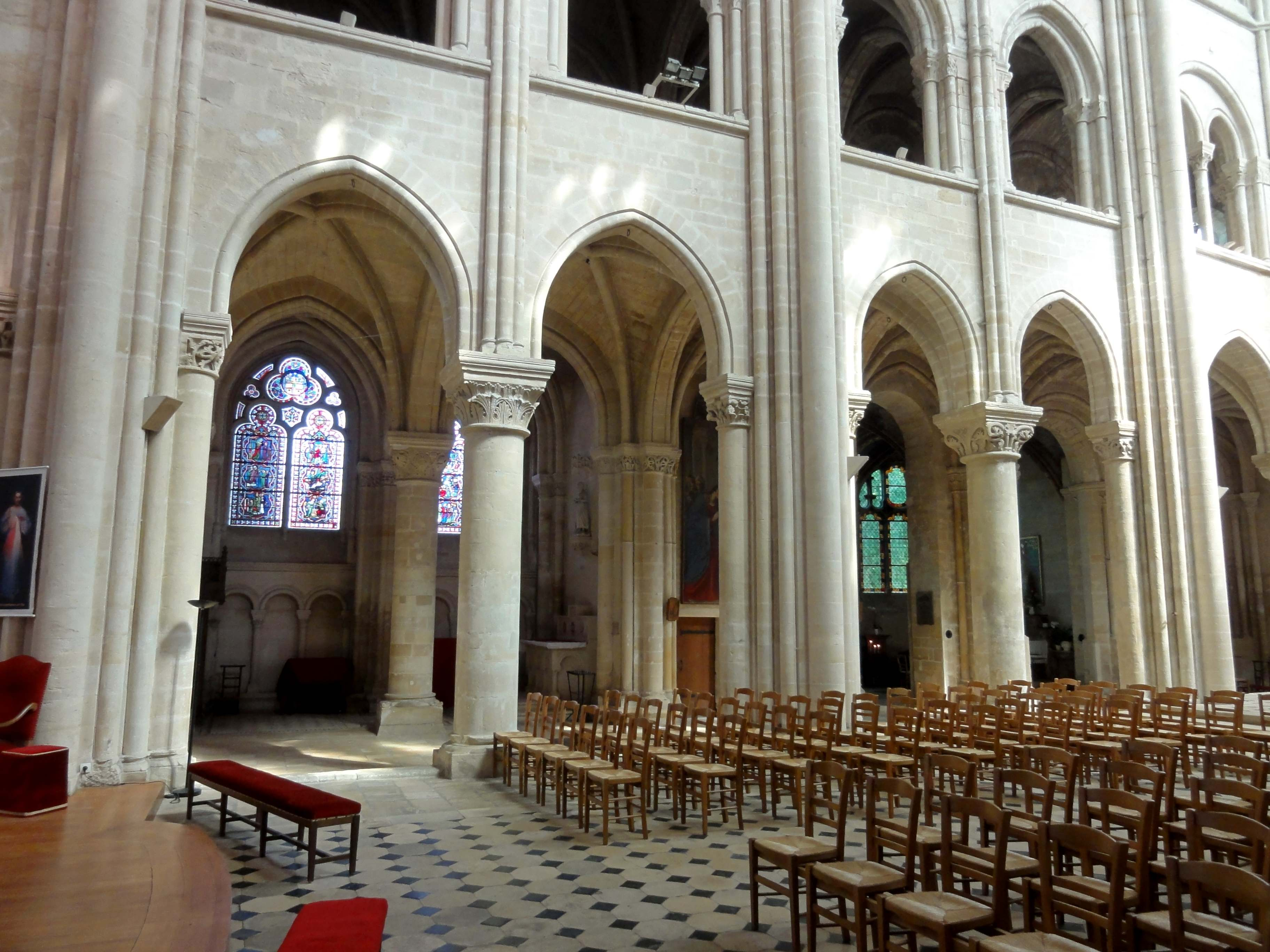
Alternating columns and piers at Senlis Cathedral

Alternation of supports is a trait of Romanesque and Early Gothic architecture, where the supports in a colonnade or arcade have different types. For example, periodic change between the strong supports (piers) and the weak ones (columns) provides visually obvious alternating supports. More subtle alternation can result, for example, from variations of the column shafts.

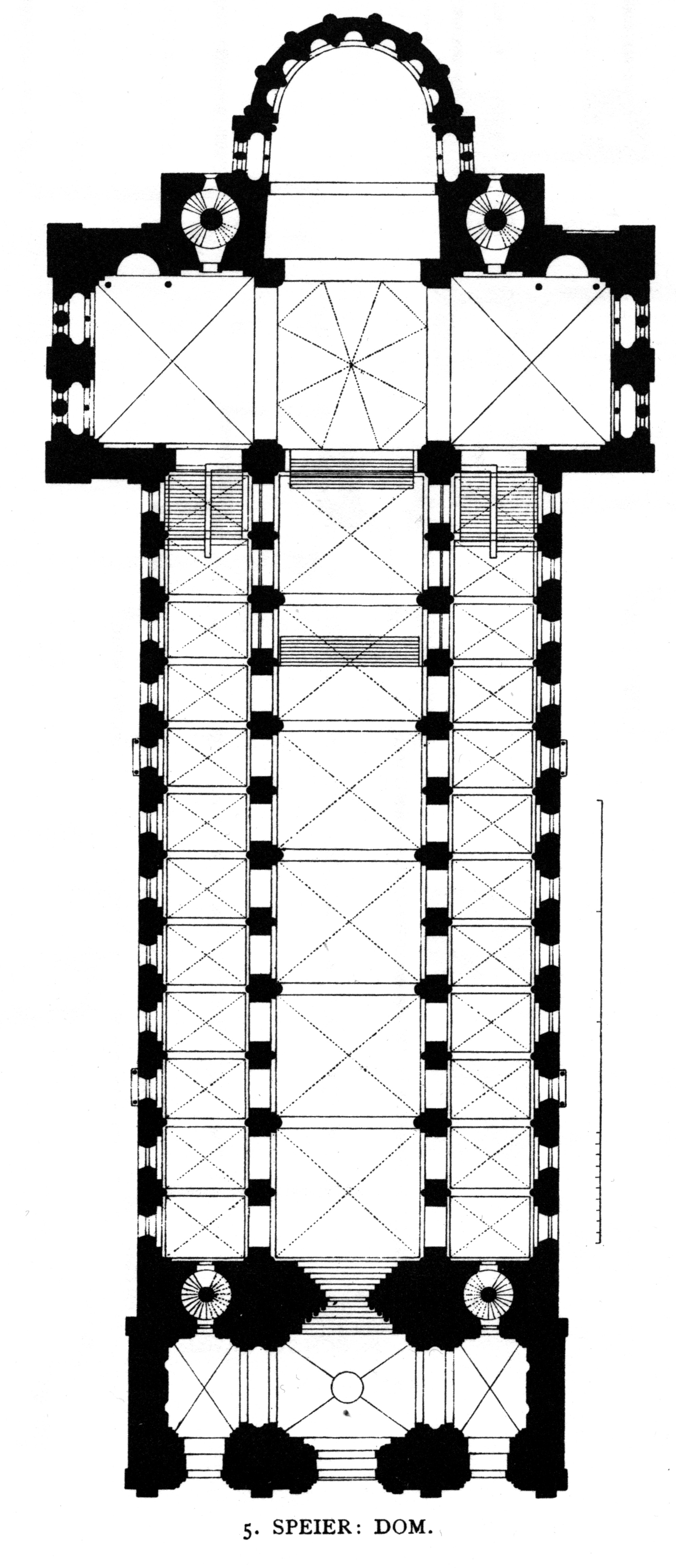
Plan of the double-bay system (Speyer Cathedral)

An early example of technique used for a decorative purpose can be found in Hagios Demetrios, a 5th century Byzantine church in Thessaloniki. The technique became common at the end of the 10th century and appears to be coupled with the use of transverse arches: the arches rested on the tops of the stronger piers. The double-bay system, with its side aisles at a half of the width of the nave, required columns for the aisle vaults placed at half the step for the transverse arches of the nave, the additional columns sometimes carried smaller load and thus can be thinner.

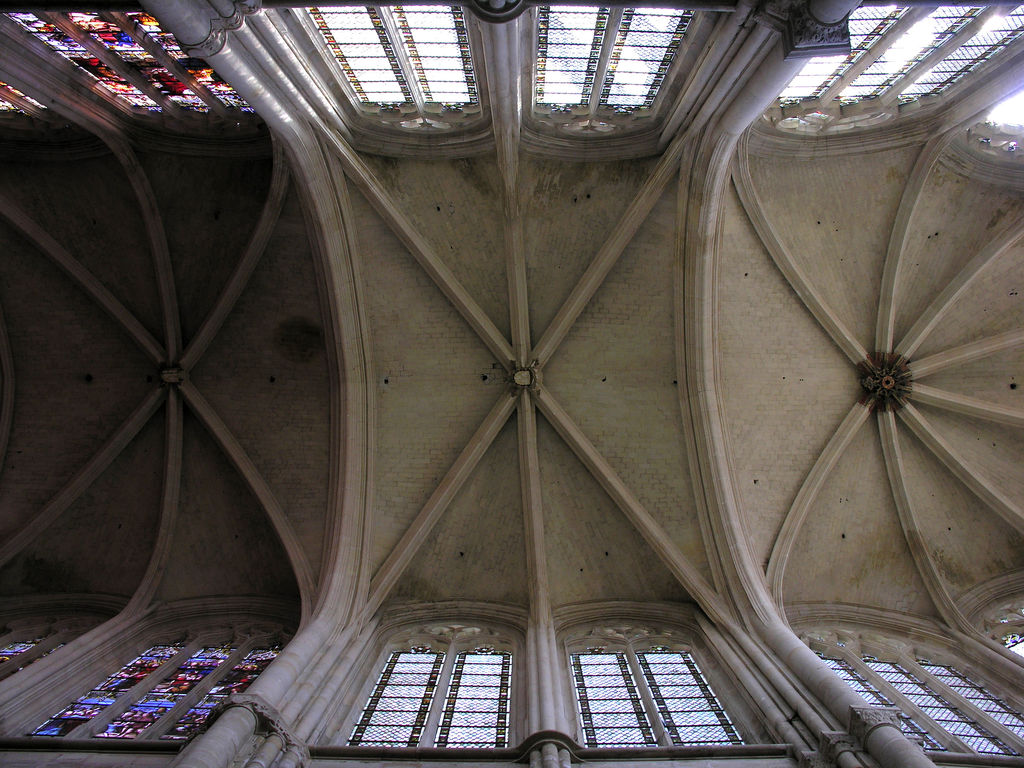
Support alternation for a Gothic sexpartite vault (Senlis Cathedral)

The use of alternating supports was largely abandoned with the introduction of Gothic architecture and its more malleable pointed arches. There were some notable exceptions, however: for example, the lateral aisles of the Notre-Dame de Paris have alternating piers of lower and greater strength that provide a "powerful appeal to the eye and the senses", but had originally fulfilled a structural need, as the heavier piers carried an extra load from the intermediate supports in the buttress system. Also, the alternation can be found in some early Gothic designs of sexpartite vaults, where the support for the middle transverse rib carries less load.

== Geography ==
The alternating supports became popular in Europe in the 11th century (early examples started to appear in the 9th century), with the use gradually transitioning from the decorative function to support for the double-bay system.

Italian architecture of the 11th and 12th century actively used the alternating system. However, frequently the column and pier alternation was used for purely decorative purposes, most likely following the Byzantine idea found in the Hagios Demetrios. Examples include San Miniato al Monte (c. 1170), San Clemente al Laterano (dedicated in 1128), Santa Maria in Cosmedin (1123), Basilica di San Nicola in Bari (1197). The alternation was also used structurally, as in Modena Cathedral (1099-1184), probably as an evolution of the decorative use.

The second area of the frequent use of the alternation was Germany, with the earliest example still standing of the church of Saint Cyriakus, Gernrode (c. 960-1014). St. Michael's Church, Hildesheim (1022), Hildesheim Cathedral (1061), and Gandersheim Abbey (1094) form an 11th-century group of churches in Saxony with alternate supports in the "dactyl" arrangement (one pier-two columns in repetition). Dactyl pattern was not new to Saxony in the 11th century, as it was used previously in Gernrode and, likely, in the old Hildesheim Cathedral (852-872). Another group of churches with alternating piers and columns is located in former Lower Lorraine: Abbey of Echternach (1016-1031), church in Zyfflich (early 11th century), Susteren Abbey (mid-11th century), Lobbes Abbey (11th century). The group might also include St Bavo's Cathedral, Ghent. The churches in Lower Lorraine use simple alternation (pier-column) as a base of the double bay system, but without the galleries. A fully developed double bay system with galleries can be found in the church of Soignies.

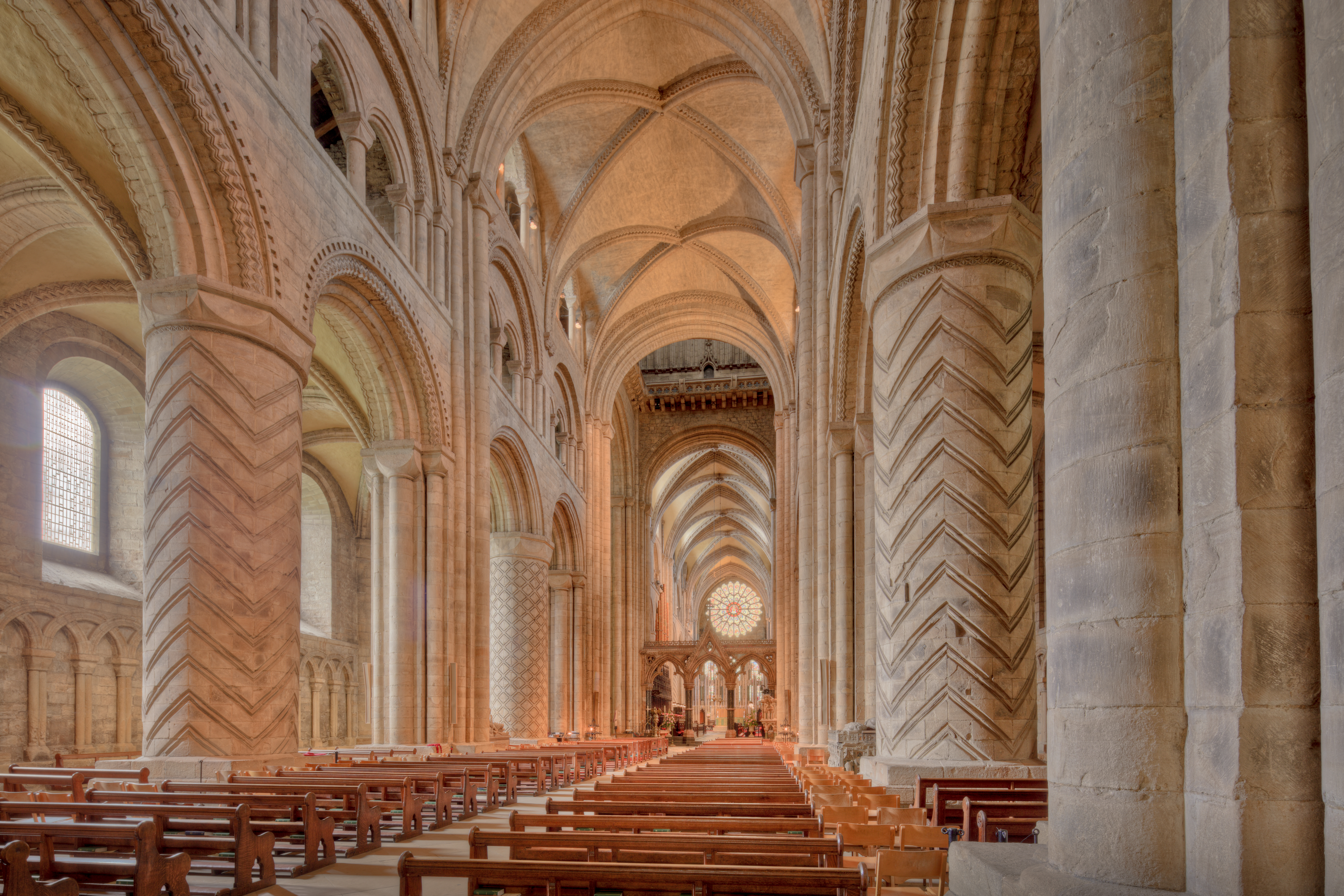
The nave of Durham Cathedral. The incised patterns on the columns were formerly filled with precious metals.

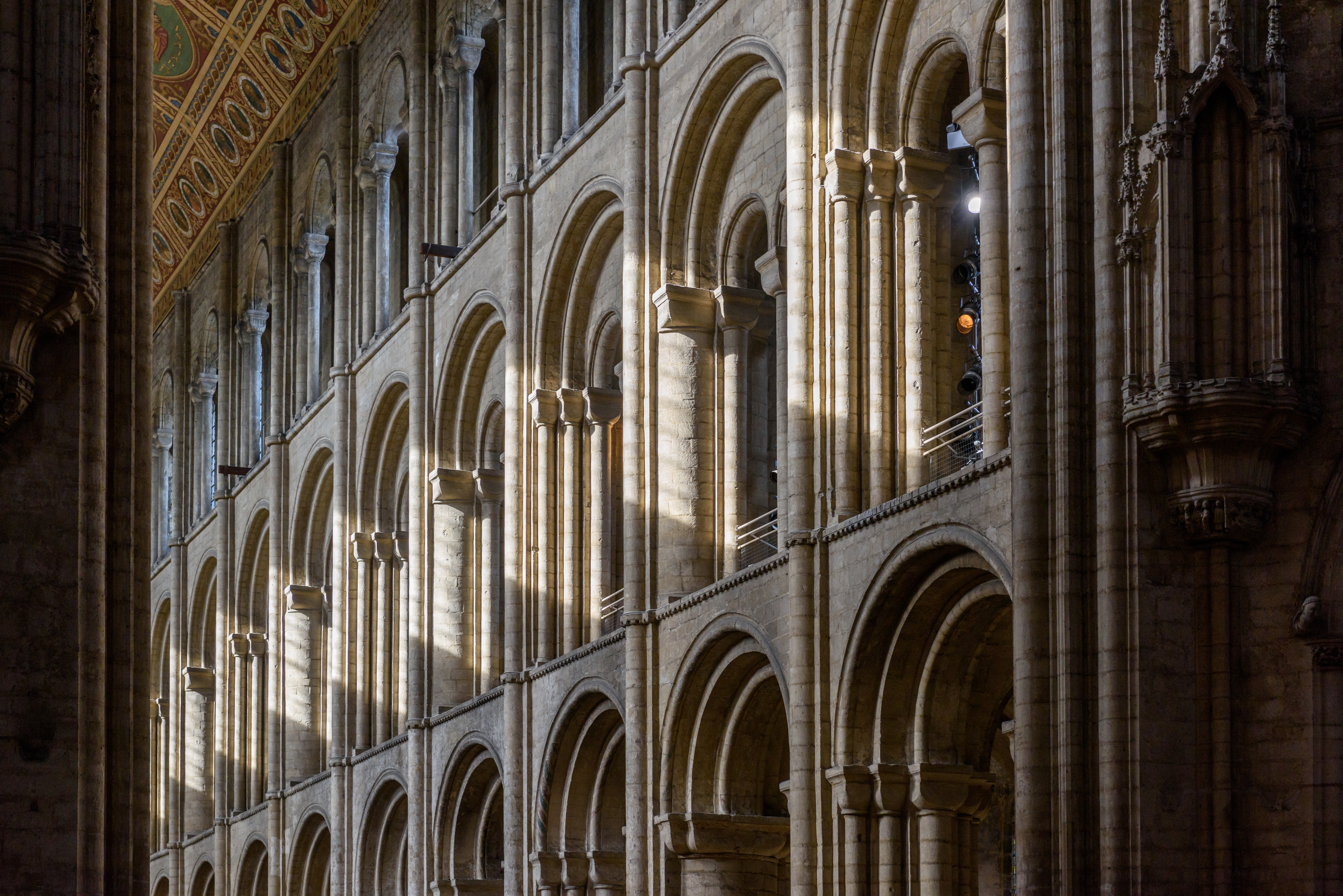
Subtle alternation in the nave of Ely Cathedral.

The use of alternating supports was not common in Normandy, with notable exceptions of Jumièges Abbey (1052-1066) and Lyre Abbey (12th century), the former being an early example of a double-bay transition. Alternation was also occasionally seen in Norman architecture in England. This could be subtle, as at East Anglian churches like Ely Cathedral and Peterborough Abbey (now also a cathedral), where two alternating forms of compound piers were used, or it could be dramatic, as at Durham Cathedral and its derivatives, where compound piers alternate with elephantine round drums, ornamented with chevrons, spirals and fluting. At Durham, the alternation continues into the vault, with transverse arches only occurring above the compound piers.

== Sources ==
- Frankl, P. (1918). Die Baukunst des Mittelalters. Handbuch der Kunstwissenschaft (in German). Akademische Verlagsgesellschaft Athenaion.
- Gem, R. (1980). "The romanesque rebuilding of Westminster Abbey". Proceedings of the Battle Conference on Anglo-Norman Studies. Vol. 3. pp. 33–60.
- Humann, G. (1925). Stützenwechsel in der Romanischen Baukunst. Studien zur deutschen Kunstgeschichte (in German). J.H. Ed. Heitz.
- Davies, N.; Jokiniemi, E. (2008). "Roman and Romanesque Vaulting". Dictionary of Architecture and Building Construction. Taylor & Francis. ISBN 978-1-136-41026-0.
- Jantzen, H. (1984). High Gothic: The Classic Cathedrals of Chartres, Reims, Amiens. Princeton paperbacks. Princeton University Press. ISBN 978-0-691-00372-6.
