= Claudius Schraudolph the Elder =

German painter and lithographer

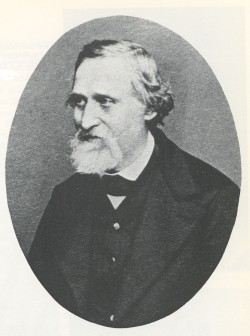
Claudius Schraudolph the Elder

Claudius Schraudolph the Elder (2 October 1813 - 13 November 1891) was a German history painter, lithographer and woodcut artist.

== Life ==
Born in Oberstdorf, he was brother to Johann and Matthias and uncle to Johann's son Claudius Schraudolph the Younger. He studied in the studio of Heinrich Maria von Hess and thanks to him was able aged only 19 to attend Munich's new Academy of Fine Arts, founded in 1831. Maximilian II Joseph of Bavaria's will later enabled Claudius to travel to Italy to study fresco-painting techniques with Joseph Anton Fischer, another painter.

After returning to Munich he there collaborated with Johann on the fresco cycle in the All Saints' Chapel of the Munich Residenz, and assisted him in frescoes for Speyer Cathedral. He also painted frescoes in the Residenz zu Athen. After Johann's death in 1879, Claudius returned home and painted several regional churches, along with the painted façade of Munich's Hotel Königshof in 1880. He died in Oberstdorf.

== Bibliography ==
- Hyacinth Holland (1908). "Schraudolph, Claudius" . Allgemeine Deutsche Biographie (in German). Vol. 54. Leipzig: Duncker & Humblot. pp. 179–181.
- Margit Ksoll-Marcon (1995). "Schraudolph, Claudius, d. Ä.". In Bautz, Traugott (ed.). Biographisch-Bibliographisches Kirchenlexikon (BBKL) (in German). Vol. 9. Herzberg: Bautz. cols. 915–916. ISBN 3-88309-058-1.

== External links (in German) ==
- Oberstdorf-Online: Claudius Schraudolph der Ältere
- Akademie der Bildenden Künste München: Claudius Schraudolph der Ältere in der Matrikeldatenbank
