= Claudius Schraudolph the Younger =

German painter and illustrator

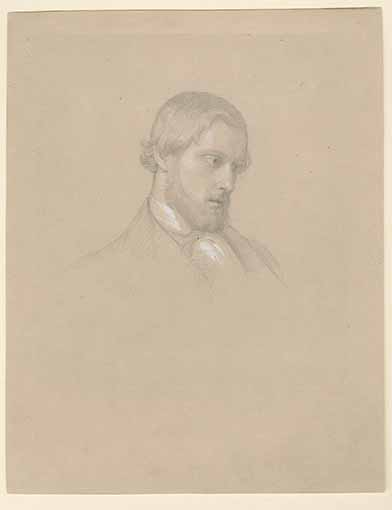
Claudius Schraudolph

Claudius Schraudolph the Younger (4 February 1843 - 4 January 1902) was a German painter and illustrator. He produced full-scale paintings, woodcut illustrations and decorative paintings. He is known as "the Younger" to distinguish him from his uncle Claudius, also a painter.

== Life ==
Born in Munich, he studied not only under his father Johann Schraudolph but also under Hermann Anschütz and Johann Georg Hiltensperger. He was a student assistant to the painters of Speyer Cathedral and initially specialised in religious paintings before switching to genre painting in 1866. He also served in the Austro-Prussian War and Franco-Prussian War as an army Oberleutnant.

He was director of the Royal Art School in Stuttgart from June 1883 to 1894. He died in the St. Michael district of Eppan, South Tyrol, Italy in 1902.

== Selected works ==
- Girl at the Piano
- The Easter Walk from Goethe's Faust
- Quartet on a Venetian Terrace
- Dolce far niente

== Bibliography (in German) ==
- Margit Ksoll-Marcon (1995). "Schraudolph, Claudius d. J.". In Bautz, Traugott (ed.). Biographisch-Bibliographisches Kirchenlexikon (BBKL) (in German). Vol. 9. Herzberg: Bautz. col. 916. ISBN 3-88309-058-1.
- Hyacinth Holland (1891). "Schraudolph, Johann v." . Allgemeine Deutsche Biographie (in German). Vol. 32. Leipzig: Duncker & Humblot. pp. 453–461. (featured in the article on his father and teacher Johann Schraudolph)
- Hyacinth Holland (1908). "Schraudolph, Claudius" . Allgemeine Deutsche Biographie (in German). Vol. 54. Leipzig: Duncker & Humblot. pp. 179–181. (featured in the article on his uncle Claudius Schraudolph the Elder)
- 'Claudius Schraudolph der Jüngere.' In: Hans Vollmer (ed.): Allgemeines Lexikon der Bildenden Künstler von der Antike bis zur Gegenwart. Begründet von Ulrich Thieme und Felix Becker. Band 30: Scheffel–Siemerding. E. A. Seemann, Leipzig 1936, p. 278.
- Münchner Maler im 19. Jahrhundert. Vol. 4, 1983, p. 102.
