= Johann von Schraudolph =

German painter

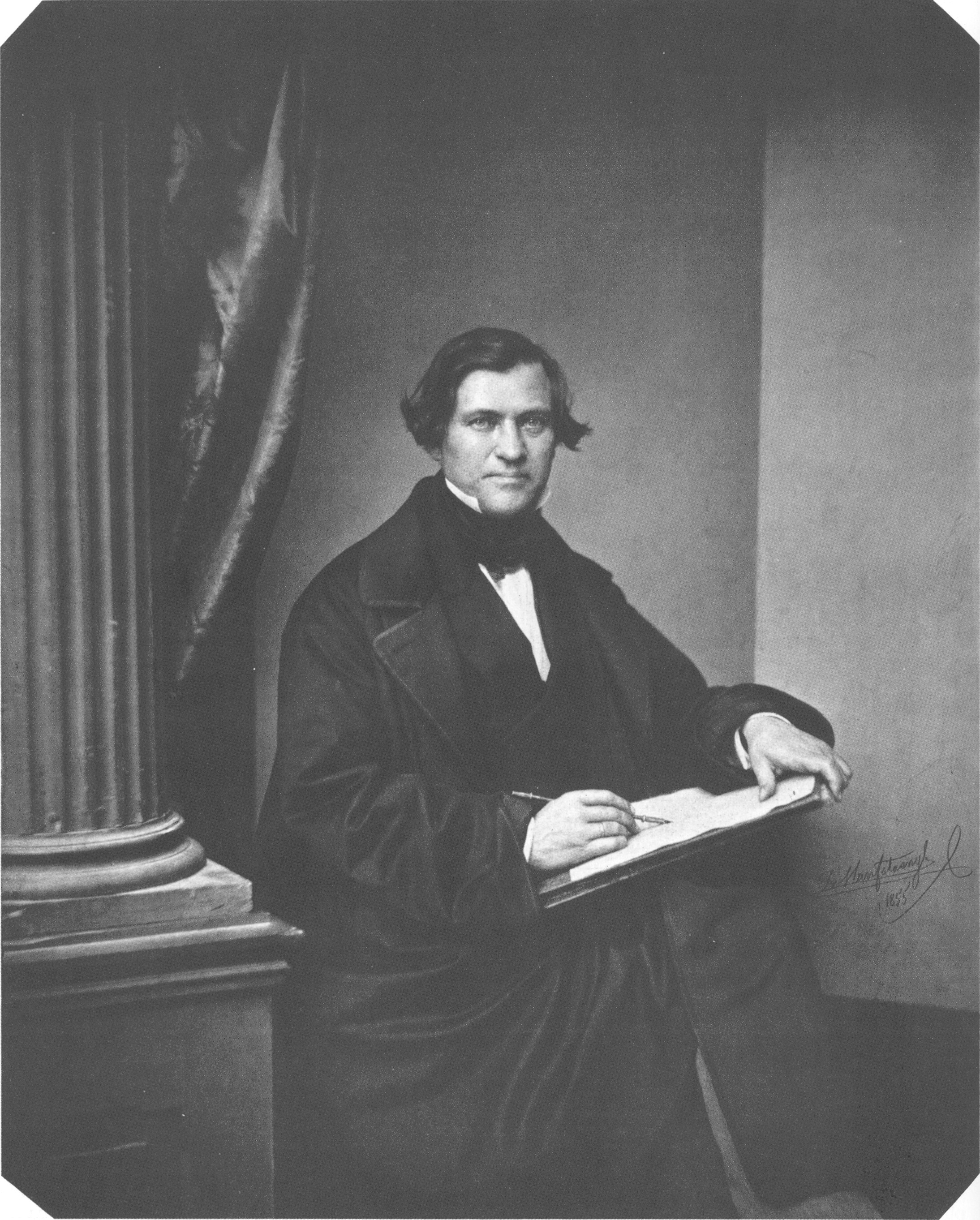
Johann von Schraudolph, by Franz Hanfstaengl

Johann von Schraudolph (1808 – 31 May 1879) was a German historical painter. His brother Matthias and his son Claudius were both also painters.

== Life ==
Von Schraudolph was born in Oberstdorf im Allgäu.

As pupil and assistant of Heinrich Maria von Hess, he painted five scenes from the life of St. Boniface in the basilica at Munich: St. Boniface preaching; his consecration as bishop; the cutting down of Thor's oak; the anointing of Pepin; and the burial of St. Boniface. Hess had already tested his work in the Church of All Saints in Munich, where Schraudolph had painted scenes from the history of Moses, figures of David, Saul, etc. (which were destroyed by bombing in World War II). Some of his devotional pictures became very popular: the Virgin with the Child Jesus; St. Agnes; Christ as the Friend of children; a eucharistic service, etc.

On the recommendation of Hess he received an important commission from Ludwig I of Bavaria, namely the painting of the frescoes for the cathedral of Speyer. Although he had already travelled once through Italy under the guidance of J. Ant. Forster and had made numerous copies of the Old Masters, yet he considered it necessary to make a new journey to Rome to visit the artist Johann Friedrich Overbeck for the sake of this, his magnum opus. He made sure of the unity of the series by keeping his assistants (his brother Claudius, Hellweger, Andr. Mayer, etc.) in strict subordination to himself, by retaining for himself the designing of all the compositions for the cupola, the three choirs, and most of those for the nave, by drawing the most important cartoons and painting the most difficult pictures himself. The unifying conception of all the frescoes is the divine plan of salvation, with special reference to the Blessed Virgin and the other patron saints of the cathedral, the deacon Stephen, Pope St. Stephen, and St. Bernard. After the completion of this undertaking Schraudolph enjoyed the favour of the king, who frequently inspected the numerous oil paintings produced in Schraudolph's studio, and at times bought them for himself or the Alte Pinakothek.

== Gallery ==
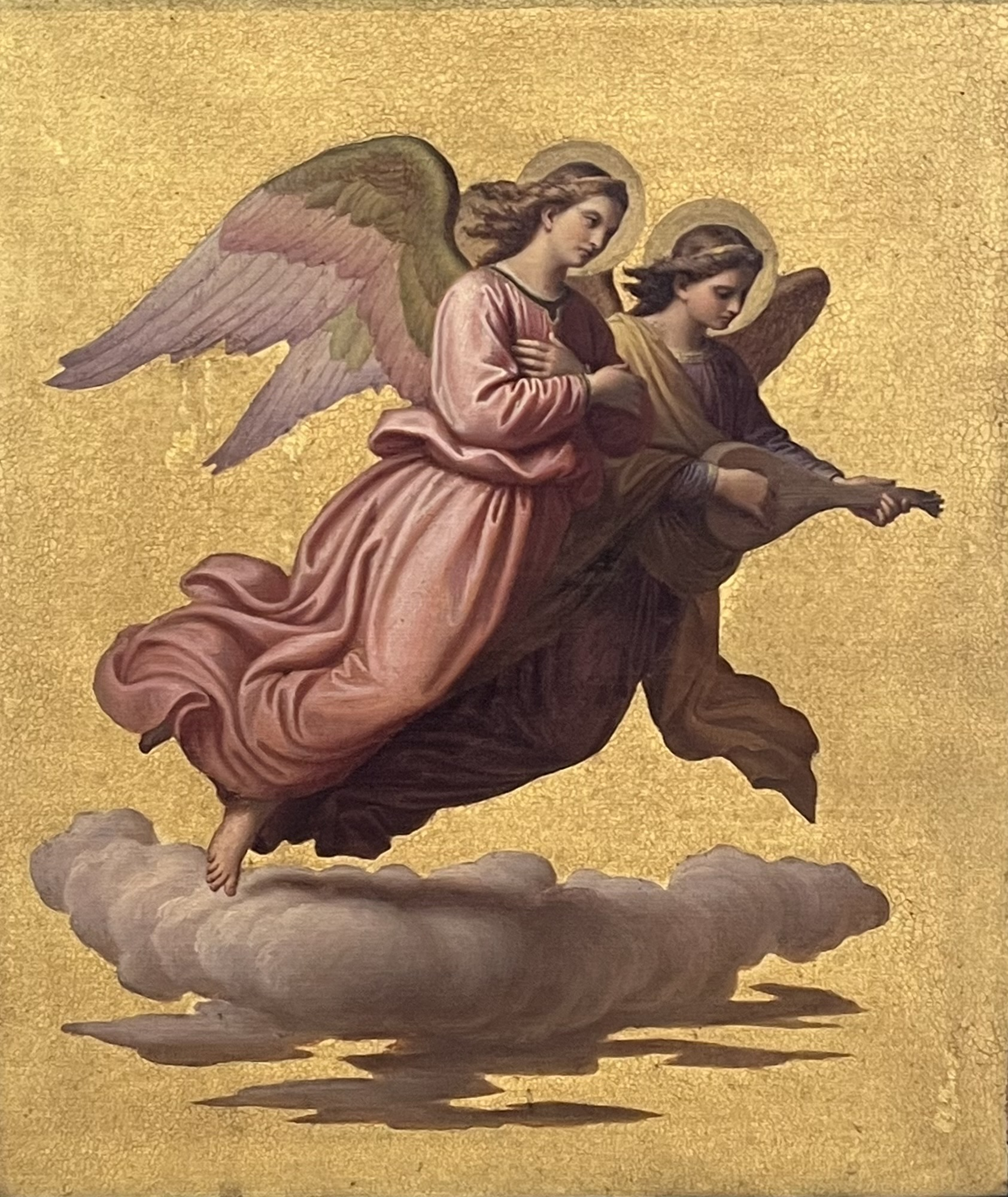
Two Angels Floating, Kunstmuseum Basel

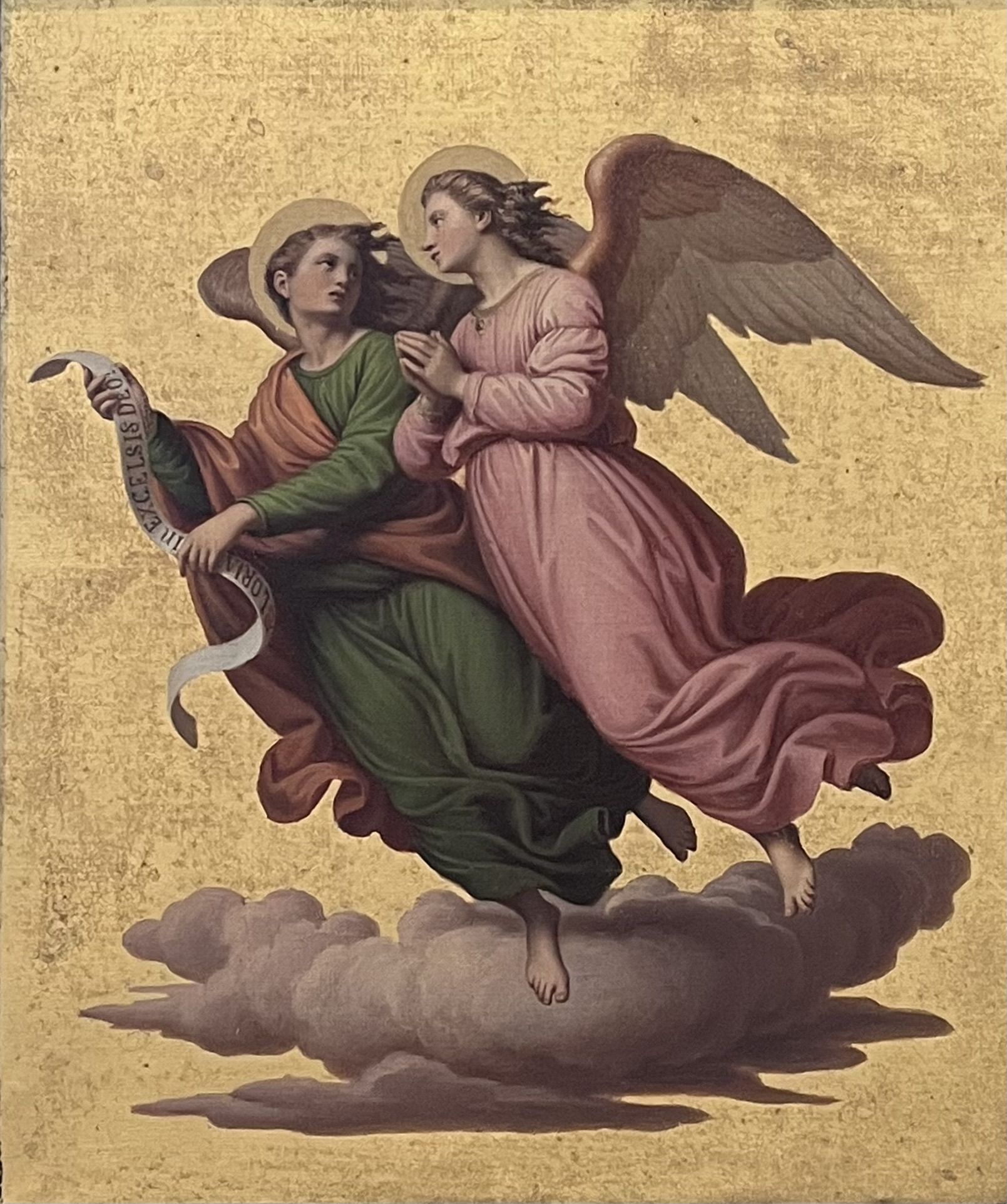
Two Angels Floating, Kunstmuseum Basel
