= Matthias Schraudolph =

German painter

Matthias or Mathias Schraudolph (24 February 1812 or 1817 – 6 February 1863) was a German painter and Benedictine monk in Metten Abbey under the religious name Frater Lucas OSB.

Born in Oberstdorf, he studied art under his brothers Johann and Claudius "without reaching [the same proficiency] as his role models". He mainly produced altarpieces and other religious works for Metten Abbey and neighbouring parish churches. Many of his works were removed from churches after 1950 as 19th century art became less and less popular. He died in Metten.

== Selected works ==
- Altarpieces for the side-altars in the church at Metten Abbey - replaced by Baroque paintings during a 1960s restoration of the church
- Altarpiece of St Nicholas for the high altar at the parish church in Edenstetten - now in the church's presbytery
- Altarpieces for the side-altars, John the Baptist, Madonna and Child and predella, all for the parish church of St. Johannes der Täufer in Treis (Treis-Karden)

== Bibliography (in German) ==
- Hyac. Holland (1891). "Matthias Schraudolph" . Allgemeine Deutsche Biographie (in German). Vol. 32. Leipzig: Duncker & Humblot. p. 461.
- Michael Kaufmann, Memento Mori. Zum Gedenken an die verstorbenen Konventualen der Benediktinerabtei Metten seit der Wiedererrichtung 1830 (Entwicklungsgeschichte der Benediktinerabtei Metten, Bd. 5), Metten 2008, 60f.
- Margit Ksoll-Marcon (1995). "Matthias Schraudolph". In Bautz, Traugott (ed.). Biographisch-Bibliographisches Kirchenlexikon (BBKL) (in German). Vol. 9. Herzberg: Bautz. col. 919. ISBN 3-88309-058-1.
