= Joseph Anton Fischer =

German painter

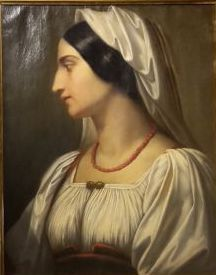
Italian Woman by Joseph Anton Fischer

Joseph Anton Fischer (1814–1859) was a German painter born at Oberstorf, Algäu.

== Biography ==
He was at first a cow-herd, but being assisted by Claudius Schraudolph the Elder, he studied at the Academy at Munich under Joseph Schlotthauer, and visited Italy in 1832 and 1843. During this time he executed cartoons under H. Hess for the glass-paintings of the Auerkirche, representing The Flight into Egypt, Death of the Virgin, Burial of the Virgin, Christ in the Temple, The Three Kings, The Angel's Salutation, The Marriage of the Virgin, and The Prophecy of Simeon in the Temple. He was a follower of Fra Angelico, and painted from 1844 to 1848 the cartoons for eight glass-paintings for the cathedral at Cologne, representing St. John the Baptist preaching, The Adoration of the Magi, The Taking down from the Cross, The Stoning of St. Stephen, The Descent of the Holy Ghost, The Four Great Prophets, The Four Evangelists, and The Four Western Fathers; for these he obtained the gold medal of Prussia. Several beautiful pen-and-ink drawings by this artist are in different collections, especially in Munich, where he died in 1859.

Among his oil paintings are the following:

- Munich. Gallery: The Flight into Egypt, 1841; The Adoration of the Magi, 1844; The Visitation, 1845; and The Entombment, 1848.
- Munich, Princess Narichkin's: The Ascension of the Virgin.

== See also ==
- List of German painters
