= Double-bay system =

Style of interior church organization

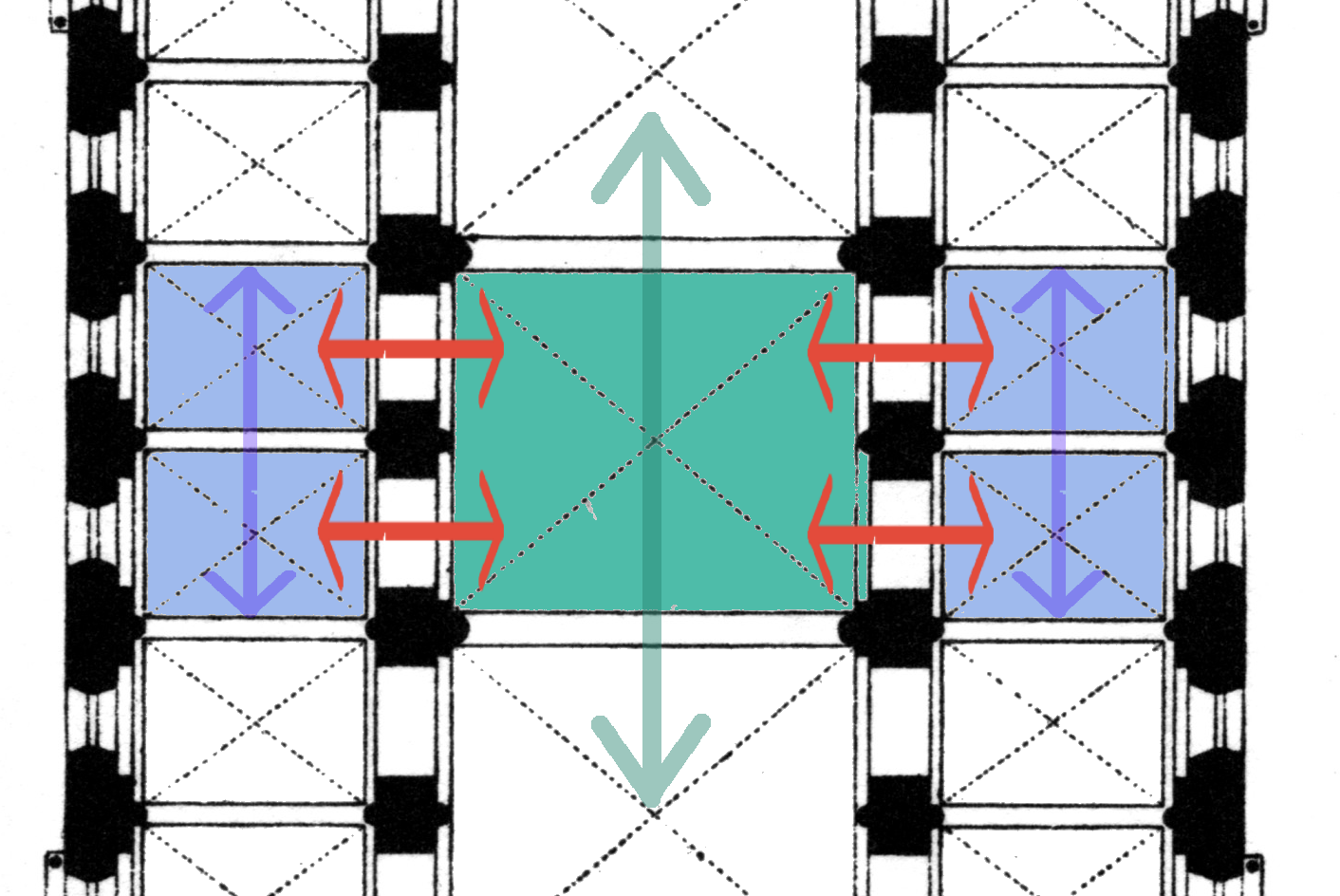
A partial plan of a church using the double bay system (Speyer Cathedral). The nave in the center uses large vaults (green), while side aisles use half-sized vaults (blue).The nave exhibits the alternation of supports (black), where the supports carrying the large vault are thicker than the ones only carrying the smaller vaults

In architecture, the double bay system (or engaged system) is an arrangement found in Romanesque architecture, where the internal space of a church is subdivided into three spaces, the nave and two side aisles, with aisles having half the width of the nave. The aisles are divided into bays, as is the nave, but each nave bay encompasses two aisle bays, with the arcade arches between the nave and aisles being grouped in pairs. This means that the bays of both the nave and aisles are square. This was necessary for churches roofed with groin vaults, as such vaults can only cover square bays, becoming badly distorted if they are raised over a rectangular space. The system was particularly used in Germany, where groin-vaulted naves were more common, as at Speyer Cathedral. The system largely fell out of use after the rib vault superseded the groin vault in the 12th century, as rib vaults with pointed arches can more easily cover rectangular bays.

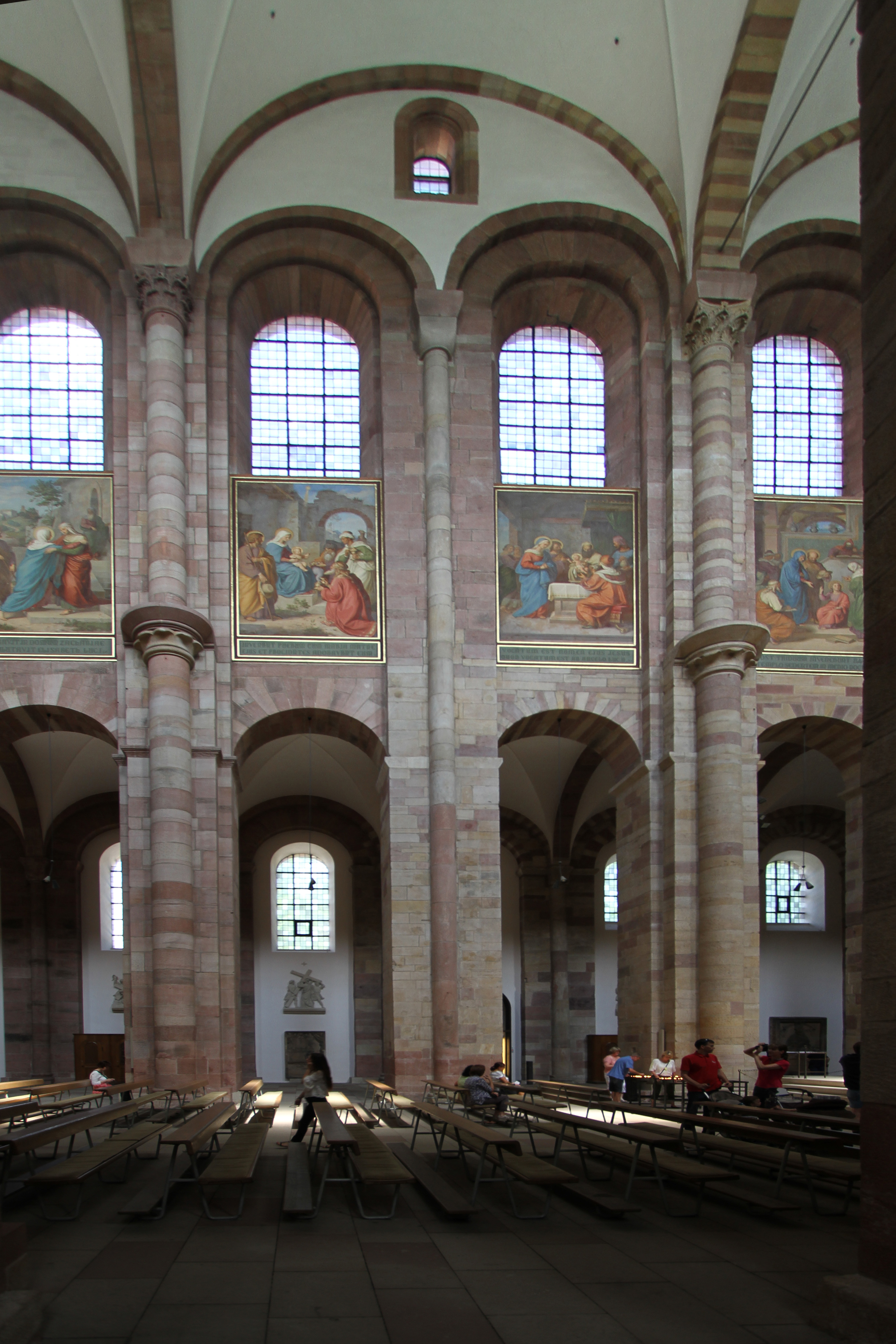
Double bay system inside Speyer Cathedral includes alternation of supports

Double-bay systems in Romanesque churches are almost always reflected in the alternation of supports, usually between compound piers and round columns, although some researchers see purely decorative alternation in some buildings, like the unvaulted Ely Cathedral.

== Sources ==
- Davies, N.; Jokiniemi, E. (2008). Dictionary of Architecture and Building Construction. Elsevier/Architectural Press. ISBN 978-0-7506-8502-3.
- Hoey, Lawrence R. (1989). "Pier Form and Vertical Wall Articulation in English Romanesque Architecture". Journal of the Society of Architectural Historians. 48 (3). University of California Press: 258–283. ISSN 0037-9808. JSTOR 990431.
