= History of Speyer =

Imperial Town of Speyer Reichsstadt Speyer
- 1294–1792
- Status: Free Imperial City of the Holy Roman Empire
- Capital: Speyer
- Government: Republic
- Historical era: Middle Ages / Early modern period
  - Founded: ca 10 BC
  - Gained Reichsfreiheit: 1294
  - Speyer Imperial Diet confirms Edict of Worms: April 19, 1529
  - Protestation at Speyer: April 20, 1529
  - Town razed by France: 1688
  - Annexed by France: 1792
  - Annexed to Bavaria: 1816
  - Disestablished: 1792
  - Pfalz District merged into Rheinland-Pfalz: August 10, 1946
Preceded by	Succeeded by
Bishopric of Speyer / Bishopric of Speyer	Mont-Tonnerre

The history of Speyer begins with the establishment of a Roman camp in 10 BCE, making it one of Germany's oldest cities. Its name evolved from Spira, first mentioned in 614. As of 1294 a Free Imperial City, the town became renowned for its Romanesque cathedral, its vibrant Jewish community, its seat of the Imperial Chamber Court, for 50 diets that took place within its walls, most notably 1526 and 1529, and last but not least, for the Protestation at Speyer. For several centuries from the Middle Ages into the early modern period, Speyer was one of the main centres of gravity of the Holy Roman Empire.

== Timeline ==
- In 10 BC, the first Roman military camp is established (situated between the old town hall and the episcopal palace).
- In 150, the town appears as Noviomagus on the world map of the Greek Ptolemaios.
- In 346, a bishop for the town is mentioned for the first time.
- In 1030, Emperor Conrad II starts the construction of Speyer Cathedral, today one of the UNESCO World Heritage Sites.
- In 1076, Emperor Henry IV embarks from Speyer, his favourite town, for Canossa.
- In 1084, establishment of the first Jewish community in Speyer.
- In 1294, the bishop lost most of his previous rights, and from now on Speyer is a Free Imperial Town of the Holy Roman Empire.
- In 1349, the Jewish community of Speyer is totally wiped out.
- Between 1527 and 1689, Speyer is the seat of the Imperial Chamber Court.
- In 1526, at the Diet of Speyer (1526), interim toleration of Lutheran teaching and worship is decreed.
- In 1529, at the Diet of Speyer (1529), the Lutheran states of the empire protested against the anti-Reformation resolutions (19 April 1529 Protestation at Speyer, hence the term Protestantism.)
- In 1635, Marshal of France Urbain de Maillé-Bréze conquered Heidelberg also Speyer, together with Jacques-Nompar de Caumont, duc de la Force, at the head of the Army of Germany.
- In 1689, the town was heavily damaged by French troops.
- Between 1792 and 1814, Speyer was under French jurisdiction.
- In 1816, Speyer became the seat of administration of the Palatinate and of the government of the Rhine District of Bavaria (later called the Bavarian Palatinate), and remained so until the end of World War II.
- Between 1883 and 1904, the Memorial Church is built in remembrance of the Protestation of 1529.
- In 1947, the State Academy of Administrative Science was founded (later renamed German University of Administrative Sciences Speyer).
- In 1990, Speyer celebrated its 2000th anniversary.

== Before the arrival of the Romans ==
An important factor in the establishment of a settlement at Speyer was its location on the main European traffic routes along the Rhine. There were only very few locations along the Rhine between Basel and Mainz where banks were high enough to be safe from floods, yet still close to the river. Another advantage was the nearby confluence of the Neckar, 20 km downstream. The Neckar valley stretches southeast towards the Danube. To the west, the low hills between the Palatinate Forest and Hunsrück mountains made for easy access in the direction of modern-day Kaiserslautern and beyond to Gaul. Several ferries across the Rhine near Speyer in the medieval era bear witness to its importance as a crossroads.

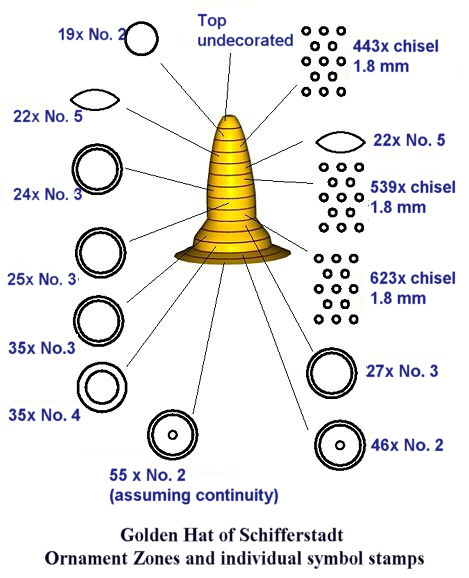
Golden Hat in the Historical Museum of the Palatinate in Speyer

5,000-year-old evidence of permanent agricultural settlements around Speyer shows that these advantages did not escape the attention of Neolithic, Bronze Age, Hallstatt culture and La Tène culture peoples. One of the most renowned finds from around 1500 BC is the Golden Hat of Schifferstadt, discovered in a field about 10 km northwest of Speyer, and now on display in the Historical Museum of Speyer. In the second millennium BC, the area of Speyer was settled by the Celtic Mediomatrici. A Celtic grave from around 50–20 BC was unearthed in Johannesstrasse. It is considered to be exceptional because Celtic grave sites were very rare in the Palatinate and Upper Rhine area at the time it was made.

== Roman times ==
After the conquest of Gaul by the Romans in 50 B.C. the Rhine became part of the border of the Roman Empire. The Romans erected camps and forts along the river from the Alps down to the North Sea. The history of Speyer began with the construction of one of these camps around 10 BC for a 500-man–strong infantry group and also intended as a base for further conquests to the east of the Rhine. The decisive factor for the location were the wedge-shaped high river banks, of which the tip pointed far east into the floodplain of the Rhine. Thus, the settlement, although right by the river, was safe from floods. Due to the river's extensive meandering such possibilities were very rare between Basel and Mainz. The first fort was erected in the eastern section of today's Maximilianstrasse between the Kleine Pfaffengasse and the Grosse Himmelsgasse. The southern moat was located along the Kleine Pfaffengasse.

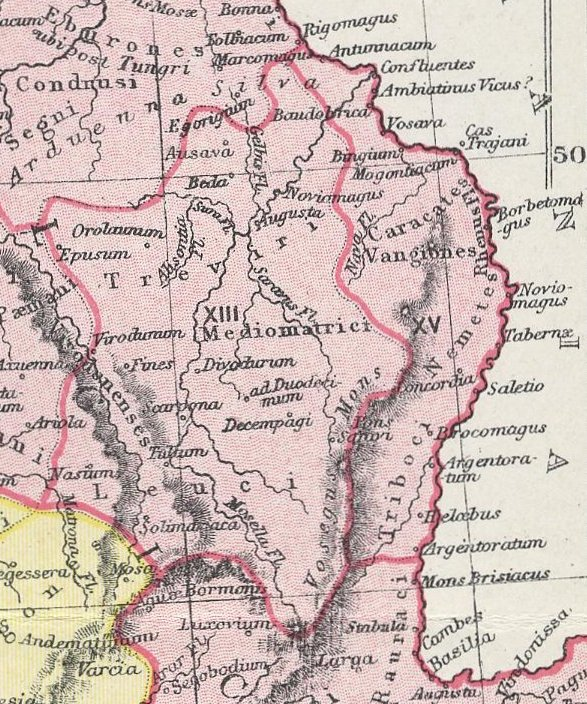
The Rhine border and settlement area of the Nemetes around late Roman Speyer ("Noviomagus")

With the consent of the Romans under Emperor Augustus the Germanic tribe of the Nemetes settled in the region of Speyer; other Germanic tribes from across the Rhine, the Vangiones and Triboci settled in the neighbouring regions of Rheingau and Alsace.

After 20 years, the first fort was replaced by a second one, partially overlapping the former, its northern wall corresponding with the former southern wall of the old fort. Remains of this fort were found in the Jewish quarter. Its southern wall is assumed to have bordered directly at the edge of the high bank, along which, in those days, the Rhine was flowing. To the west and to the north the fortifications were made of a system of walls and moats. The erection of the second fort corresponds with the reorganization of the Roman Rhine frontier after the disaster in the Battle of the Teutoburg Forest. The vicinity to the east and west of the forts attracted civilian settlements (Vicus) which were the impetus for the development of Speyer as a town. The main vicus stretched to the west from Herdstrasse probably as far as Zeppelinstrasse and a smaller one in the east in the area south of the cathedral. As of 30 A.D. there were a number of representative buildings forming a "U" like a market forum, indicating that the vicus very likely already had market rights (ius nundinarum).

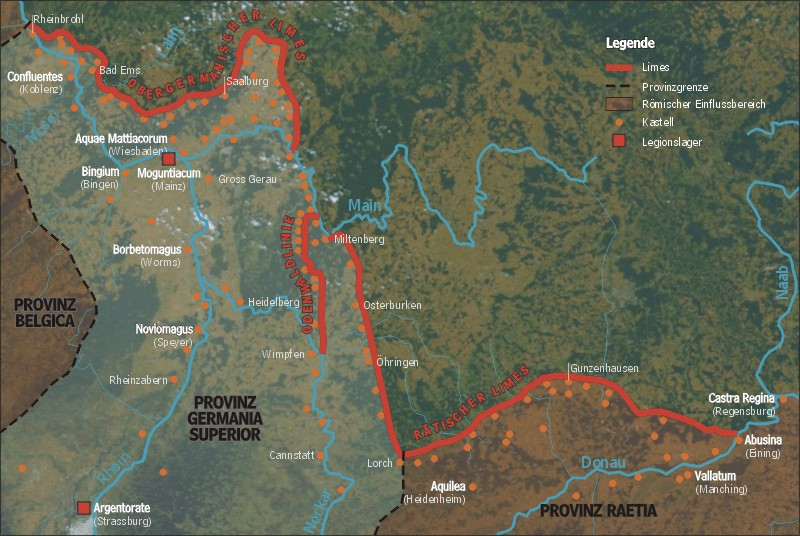
Noviomagus in the Roman Empire

The second fort was again replaced by a third one a little further away from the Rhine between the middle-section of Maximilianstrasse and Ludwigstrasse, yet, some of its area still overlapping the former forts. The reason for the move might have been a flood, lack of space or the need for a renewal. It seems that this last fort was considerably larger than the two former ones. It existed at least until 74 when the auxiliary troops were moved into the newly conquered territories east of the Rhine. Speyer was no longer a border post and lost its military significance. As of 83, it became part of the Roman province of Germania superior. The fort was given up, the vicus was granted self-government and became the capital of the Nemetes area as Civitas Nemetum, overseeing the western Rhenish plain of the Palatinate and northern Alsace. Around 150, the town appeared as Noviomagus (a Latinized form of the Celtic Novio Magos, "New Field" or "Market") on Ptolemy's world map. The same name is mentioned at the beginning of the 3rd century in the Antonine Itinerary, a road handbook of the Roman Empire, and on the Tabula Peutingeriana, another road map from the 3rd century. The name can also be found on milestones along the Rhine. As the name was shared by many other cities, Speyer was sometimes distinguished as Noviomagus Nemetum ("Noviomagus of the Nemetes"). At a central point of the Roman Rhine valley road, Speyer emerged as a representative town and an administrative regional centre. Two main streets crossed in the centre of Speyer. The decumanus (east–west street) was 6–8 m wide, leading from today's cathedral area along Kleine Pfaffengasse past the Königsplatz further to the west. Along its whole length it was lined with colonnades. A second main street started around today's Hagedorngasse and crossed the decumanus south of today's Kaufhof (department store). Strong foundations found in the area of the Königsplatz are considered to be remnants of a forum with a temple. The size of a part of a Jupiter (mythology) pillar is similar to a large pillar found in Mainz. Other findings show there were a market place, wide, public buildings, living quarters, temples and a theatre. It is practically impossible to do any digging below street level without striking remnants of this era. The numerous finds, for example the oldest preserved and still sealed wine bottle in Germany, the Speyer wine bottle, can be seen in the Historical Museum of the Palatinate (Historisches Museum der Pfalz).

== Speyer in the migration period ==
Roman Speyer was not spared from upheavals in the migration period. With the completion of the Limes in the 1st century AD Speyer was no longer a border town. Flourishing times for Speyer continued after the collapse of the Danube border between 166 and 170 in spite of increasing incursions by Germanic tribes across the Limes. For a while the Romans managed to ward off the attacks of the Alemanni which first appeared in 213.

But as of 260 the Limes could no longer contain the constant onslaught of the Alemanni. The Romans retreated back across the Rhine; Speyer once more became a border town and took in people fleeing from the east. The Alemanni managed to cross the Rhine repeatedly, usually in winter, and in a raid in 275 the town was all but destroyed. Traces of the fires are still visible on excavation sites but it is not known what happened to the population. In 286 Diocletian had the northern provinces reorganized; civil and military administration were separated and settlements rebuilt.

By the 4th century AD the settlement had recovered and a garrison was established. In 352 the Alemanni led by Chnodomar attacked along the whole Rhine front and conquered the territory to the west of the river. The Romans under Constantine II and Julian re-established the Rhine border in the campaigns of 355. Yet the raids of the Alemanni continued. The settlement was not rebuilt. Instead, Valentinian I had the Rhine frontier fortified and small units, each with their own names, posted in garrisons along the river. In Speyer this happened at least by 369 and it was now called Nemetae. The troops posted in Speyer are listed in a military handbook (notitia dignitatum) as Vindices and the garrison remained at least until 422/423. As a refuge for the inhabitants a stronghold was built on the cathedral hill around 370 with walls 2.5 m strong. Its northern section ran parallel to the northern side of the later cathedral. The southern section corresponded with the outline of the high banks of the Rhine, today the southern wall of the historical museum where a harbour was constructed. During excavations in the 1980s remnants of boats were found there. Other findings within the fortified area indicate that an early Christian community existed within these walls. A first Bishop of Speyer is mentioned for the year 343. The grave sites found in the area indicate that the population outside the fort was still heathen. It also seems that some Alemanni were allowed to settle in the area with the consent of the Romans.

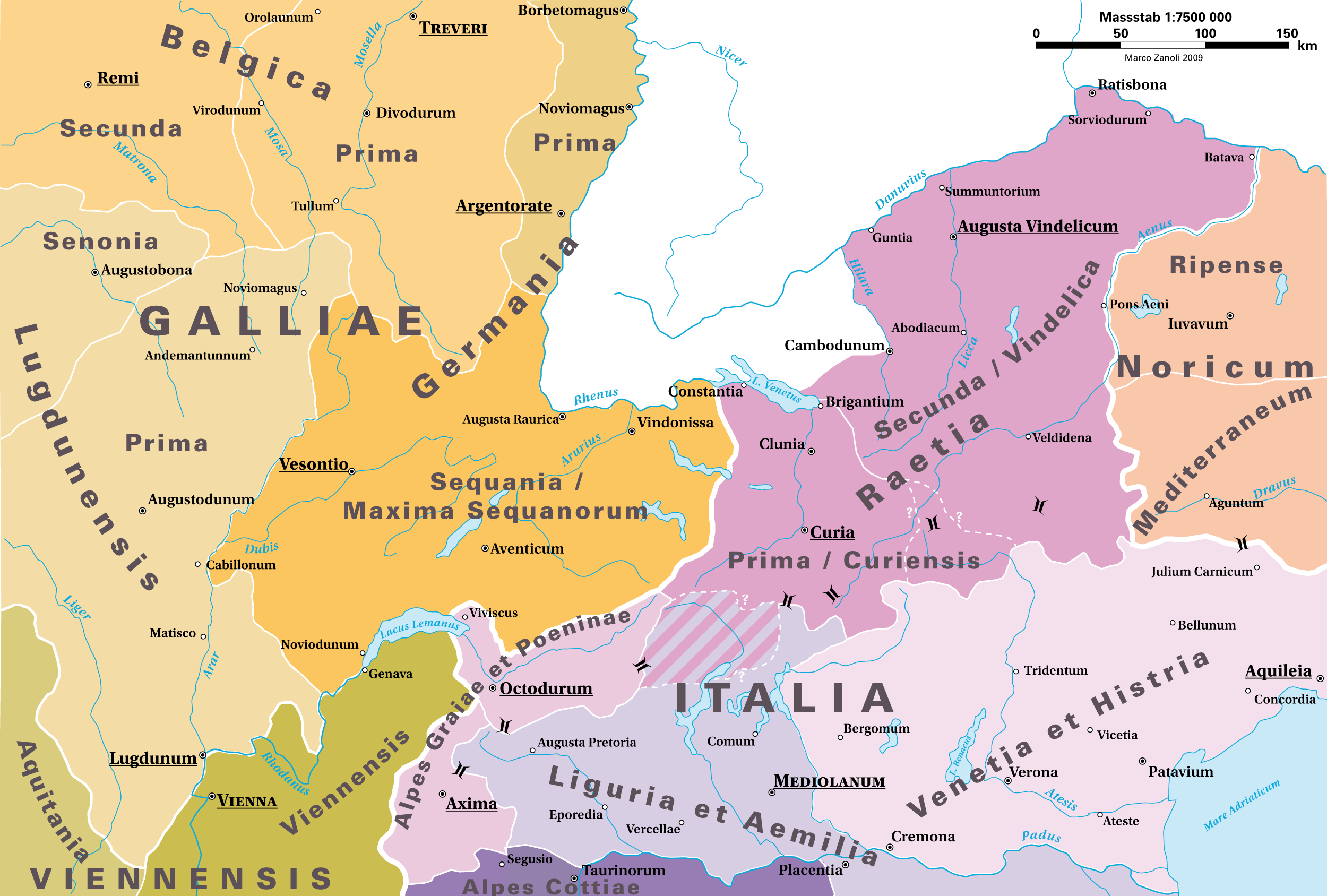
The border town of Speyer (Noviomagus) shortly before the collapse of the Western Roman Empire around 395

In the beginning of the 5th century AD the whole Roman Rhine border disintegrated under the onslaught of Germanic tribes pushing across the river. In 406, pursued by Huns, Germanic Suebi, Vandals and Sarmatian Alans set over the river and also overran Speyer on their way into Gaul. A richly endowed grave of a prince found in Altlussheim near Speyer attests to the presence of Alans, Huns or Eastern Germanic tribes at that time. This invasion was not the immediate end of Roman life and culture in the area west of the Rhine. It is assumed that Romans and Romanized country folk left sooner and that people in the towns held out longer. The Romans tried to hold the border by handing its defence to Germanic Foederati, friendly tribes who settled in the areas west of the Rhine. In the province of Germania superior in the area of Speyer these were the Franks, but they also were unable to prevent invasions such as in 406.

Initially, the tribes crossing the Rhine continued further west into Gaul. As of 450 the acquisition of land for farms can be observed around Speyer. Three such settlements were found at the Woogbach and in the Rosssprung area. From 454 on, the Romans gave up holding the Rhine as a border and the troops of the Speyer garrison were integrated into the Roman army. Immigration of Germanic peoples increased. Thus, the decline of Roman lifestyle between Speyer and Strasbourg proceeded much faster than further north between Worms and Cologne.

Around 475 there was a new small settlement called Winternheim, 2 km south of the fort, right at the edge of the high banks of the Rhine. Surprisingly, this site contained finds from the northern Germanic tribe of the Saxons. Because of similar finds further north near Mainz and Trier, it is assumed that tribes other than Alamanni settled in the area. Winternheim, probably a village of weavers, existed until the 12th century and had its own parish church, St. Ulric. Around the same time another settlement, Altspeyer, developed in the area of today's main train station, also called Villa Spira. The fort most likely still existed around 500 but the extent of the Romanized population is not known. The population change is reflected in the name of Speyer: antique Noviomagus / Nemetum became medieval Spira, indicating that Latin was no longer spoken.

== Emperors, bishops and urban citizens ==
In the battle Zülpich 496/497 and another one near Strasbourg in 506 the Franks under their King Chlodwig (Clovis I) beat the Alamanni and Speyer became part of the Frankish Kingdom. Administratively, the Franks followed the example of their Roman predecessors and Speyer became the seat of the Speyergau (county) with roughly the same outlines as the previous Roman Civitas Nemetum. Romanized civil servants and bishops from southern Gaul were transferred to the Rhine.

The eastward expansion of the Frankish kingdom beyond the Rhine also ended a time of economic isolation for Speyer as old and new travel routes opened and trade relations developed. The area was eventually settled by Franks permanently and became part of the emerging Frankish Empire. Around 500, many new settlements sprung up; in the area of Speyer these were Altspeyer, Winternheim, Marrenheim, Heiligenstein, Mechtersheim, Otterstadt and Waldsee. The town's name ‘’’Spira’’’, introduced by the Alemanni, was first mentioned in the Notitia Galliarum in the 6th century.

The Alemanni were heathen and it is assumed that the bishopric of Speyer had succumbed in the migration period. The Franks, whose King Chlodwig converted, re-established the diocese in the 5th century and extended its territories east of the Rhine. Bishop Hilderic of Speyer is mentioned in the records as a participant of the synod of Paris in 614 (national council of the Frankish empire reunited by Chlothar II). The first churches and monasteries in Speyer including a cathedral were built in the 6th and 7th centuries, Among them was the earliest verifiable church of St. Germain. St. Germain was to the south of Speyer outside the town and, considering the time, was quite large (length: 19.7 m, width 15.5 m), but its purpose is not quite clear. Another church was St. Stephen on the site of the modern day state archives south of the cathedral, also outside the town. For some time it was the predecessor of the cathedral and the burial site of the bishops. A fourth church was St. Maximus of which the site is not known.

With the establishment of a bishopric and the construction of a fortified residence for bishops Speyer became a centre of worldly and spiritual power. Around 650, the Frankish King Sigebert III, granted Bishop Principus the tithe of all royal estates in the Speyergau and the church was exempt from paying taxes to the comes. In 664/666, Sigebert's son, Childeric II, granted ‘’immunity’ to the church of Speyer under Bishop Dragobodo I. This included a number of revenues and was confirmed to Bishop Freido on 25 June 782 by Charlemagne during the Saxon wars.

The granting of privileges was to become an important means of kings and emperors to create loyal supports across the country against the local nobility. The increasing power of the bishops in turn created growing tensions with the ascending bourgeoisie and the county nobility and the emperors. The resulting feuds would shape the history of Speyer for almost six centuries.

The Carolingians established a royal palace (Königspfalz) in Speyer which served as a temporary seat of the kings and emperors. Charlemagne visited Speyer several times and in 838 Louis the Pious for the first time held court in town, the starting point of 50 diets held in Speyer in the following 600 years.

== Lord Bishops ==
See also Bishopric of Speyer

Lord of the town was the comes (district count – Gaugraf) appointed by the king. But power gradually shifted to the bishops because of various rights and privileges granted by the king. In Carolingian times, Speyer was of no great importance. The kings only spent a short time there, e. g. Charlemagne in August 774, Lothair I in 841 or Louis the German in 842, but the power of the church in Speyer continued to grow. Apart from the royal privileges, the economic basis for Speyer's bishops were their acquired possessions, substantial estates, customs and ferry levies as well as the prerogative of coinage received in the 10th century. The bishop owned possessions in a complete circle of about 8 km around Speyer.

The immunity privileges granted to church and bishops, confirmed and extended in 969 by Emperor Otto the Great and by Henry IV in 1061 placed Speyer under the protection, control and rule of the bishops. The increasing power of the bishops and the church led to repeated tensions involving the nobility of the Speyergau and the emperor in which the emerging bourgeoisie was to become a fourth party. The struggle of the town with the bishop and the church would become a recurring feature of Speyer's history during the ensuing six centuries. In this respect, Speyer is exemplary for the history of many cities of the former Holy Roman Empire.

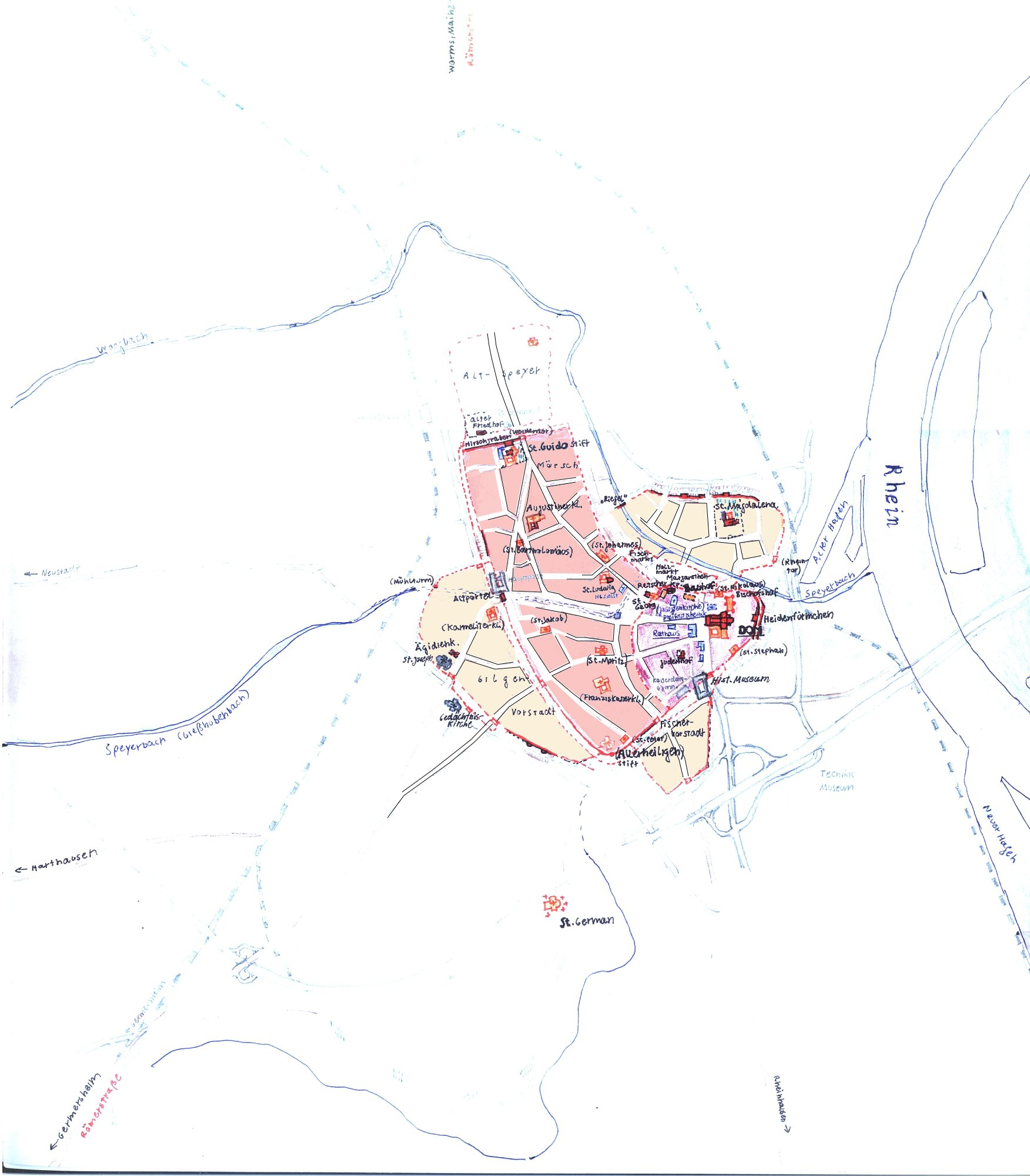
Urban development of Speyer

According to scriptures, through the times, there were several cathedrals in Speyer. The first one was built by Dagobert I around 636 for the bishops of Speyer. In the end of the 8th century St. Stephan's was either renewed or totally reconstructed. For 782 there is mention of a cathedral with the traditional name “Church of St. Mary or St. Stephan”. In 846 Bishop Gebhard (846–880) consecrated a second cathedral. For 858 there is mention of a “cathedral of the sacred virgin Mary, which stands in the town of Speyer”, “cathedral of sacred Maria, built in the town of Speyer”, or “the before mentioned sacred cathedral”. Other scriptures of 853/54 mention a “cathedral of Speyer”. Therefore, the existence of a Carolingian cathedral in Speyer is assumed but remnants were never found.

When Louis the Pious died, the empire was partitioned among his three sons. According to the Treaty of Verdun in 843 Speyer became part of East Francia under Louis the German. With the rapid development of the stem duchies within the kingdom, Speyer became part of the Duchy of Franconia. In the following years Speyer bishops participated in numerous synods and engaged in negotiations in Paris and Rome at the request of the emperor. Rhenish Franconia became the cradle of the Salian Dynasty which brought forth four German kings and Holy Roman Emperors.

In 891 Bishop Gebhard I received an endowment from King Arnulf for the cathedral Stift. Arnulf died without an heir and kingship passed to the Franconian duke Conrad I.

The first major conflict between bishop and count is known to have occurred during Conrad's reign in 913. Einhard I of Speyer and other bishops supported Conrad I in a struggle with opposing dukes. District count Werner V, progenitor of the Salian dynasty tended to expand his territories at the expense of the church and had Bishop Einhard blinded on 12 March 913. The bishop never recovered and died in 918.

Conrad I was followed by the Saxons Henry I in 919 and Otto I.

On 13 March 949, the Salian Conrad the Red, duke of Lorraine and count of Speyergau, son of Werner V and son-in-law of Otto I, granted Bishop Reginald I rights and possessions which included important sources of income for the church, e. g. the right to mint coins, half of the toll, market fees, the “salt penny,” wine tax and other taxes. This decisively strengthened the position of the bishop because already three years before he had received jurisdictional and commercial rights and other taxes. Speyer effectively came under the reign of the bishop. It is also considered a landmark in the urban development of Speyer that the content of the charter of 949 was made public to the clergy as well as to the townspeople. The bishops were also in control of the Speyer Rhine ferries.

Yet, the increase of the bishop's power did not end there. Otto I also counted on the support of the bishops, expanding a kind of imperial church system. On his campaign in Italy in 969, where he was accompanied by the Speyer Bishop Ottgar, he granted ecclesiastical immunity to the church and bishops of Speyer including an own jurisdiction, total control of the mint and tolls. This privilege was confirmed by Henry IV in 1061 placing Speyer firmly under the protection, control and rule of the bishops. By the 12th century Speyer was one of the most important mints in the empire. Bishop Balderich (970–986), a renowned academic of his time, founded the Speyer cathedral school after the example of the Abbey of Saint Gall, which was to become one of the most important school in the empire. Bishops and students from this school more and more often took on the roles of an imperial stewards and this reflected the political importance of Speyer, not the modern meaning of the term.

The first wall of the yet small town is confirmed in 969 and was commissioned by the bishop. The town covered an area of around 8–14 ha between the cathedral, today's Dreifaltigkeitskirche and Webergasse. There is first mention of a suburb in 946 settled by tradesmen and merchants and the village of Altspeyer in the immediate vicinity to the north of Speyer. Although these settlements were outside the walls, they were also under the jurisdiction of the bishop. Yet, Ottonian Speyer was still largely an agricultural settlement. In 980 the bishop recruited 20 armed horsemen for Otto's I campaign in Italy. Worms, e. g. recruited 40, Mainz and Strassburg even 100 each, giving an indication of city sizes and economic power.

In the 10th century, after a time of stagnation, the population grew and the economy picked up again. A harbour developed at the Speyerbach estuary, adjoined by a wood market and a fish market. The Ottonian layout of the streets disappeared completely and within the following 200 years the urban layout developed which is still present today. It was the start of Speyer's most glorious era which was to last into the 15th century. The history of Speyer was at the same time the history of the empire.

The development of the town in jumps and strides is reflected in two quotations from the 10th and 11th centuries, although they should not be taken verbally. In a dedication to his teacher and predecessor, Bishop Balderich (970–986), a pupil of the cathedral school (973–981) and later bishop of Speyer, the poet Walter of Speyer called Speyer a “vaccina” (cow town).

Only 150 years later, at the funeral of Henry V, the English monk Ordericus Vitalis described Speyer as metropolis Germaniae. This is not to be understood in the modern sense, but as a reference to the town as a centre of political gravity.

== The Salian dynasty, the imperial cathedral and urban expansion ==
The year 1024 marked a decisive event in the history of the town. On 4 September 1024, near Oppenheim, Conrad II, a Salian from the county of Speyergau, was elected King of Germany. The Salians placed the town in the centre of imperial politics and made it the spiritual centre of the Salian kingdom. They started a patronage of town and church which would be continued by the House of Hohenstaufen. When Conrad and his wife Gisela were not travelling, they usually lived at nearby Limburg Abbey in Speyergau and often visited Speyer. In his “Chronicle of the Free Imperial City of Speyer”, the city scribe Christoph Lehmann (1568–1638), remarked: “Dieweil Conrad viel und offt zu Speyer im königlichen palatio gewohnt hat man ihne Cunradum den Speyerer genannt” (Because Conrad often spent much time at the royal palace in Speyer he was called Conrad the Speyerer).

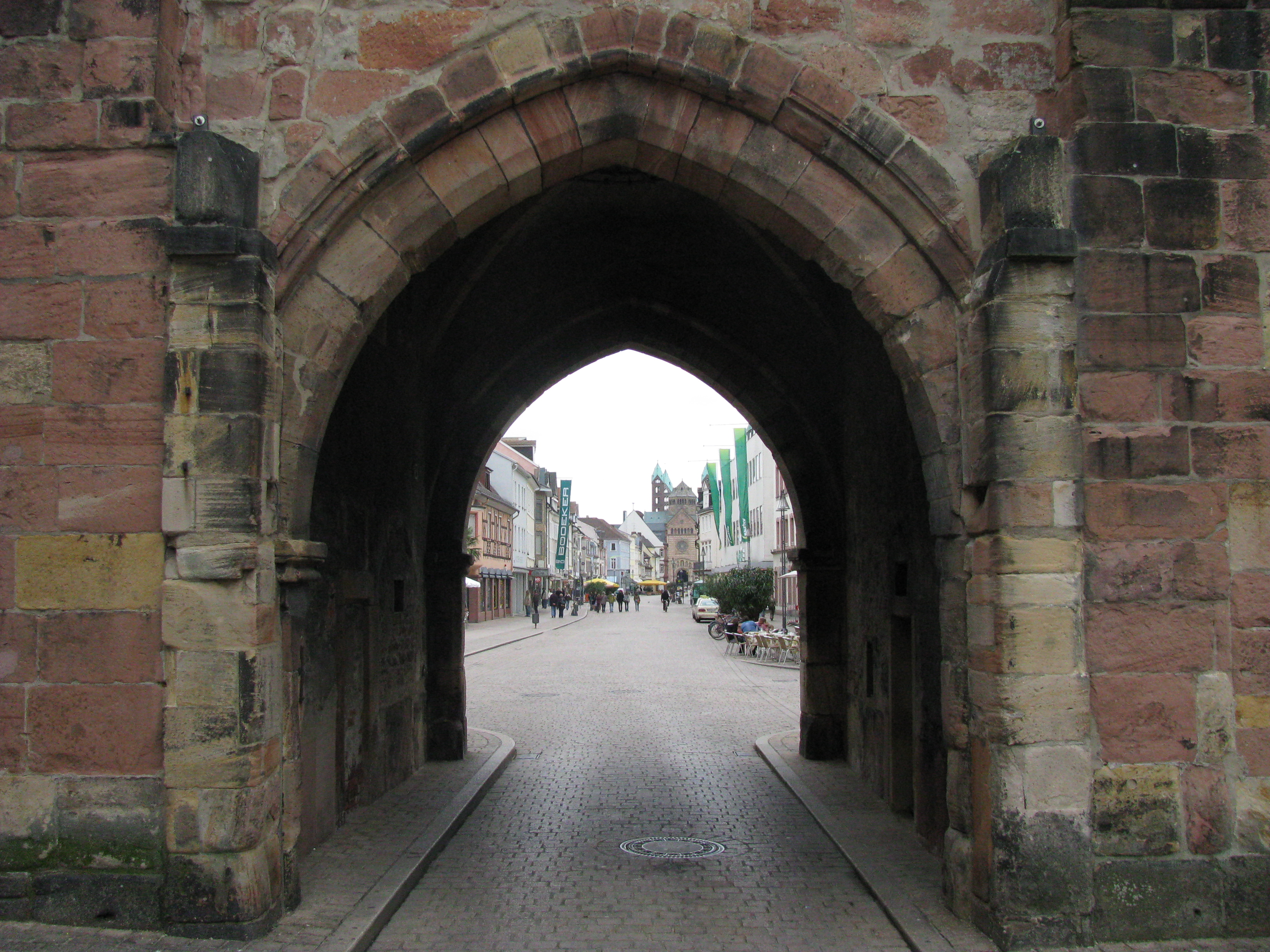
View through the gate of the Altpörtel down Maximilianstrasse to the cathedral

After he had been crowned emperor, in 1027, Conrad commissioned the construction of the Speyer Cathedral on the site of a former smaller cathedral. Work commenced in 1030, according to some sources in 1027. It is assumed that the Speyerbach was channelled to bring building materials from the Palatine Forest (sandstone and wood). The construction of a cathedral with dimensions unknown up to date underlined the increasing importance of Speyer and was the decisive impetus for the further development of the town. The construction, spanning several decades, brought many craftsmen, merchants and artists. Conrad invited experienced master-builders, such as Regimbald of Dillingen from St. Gallen, Bishop Benno II of Osnabrück and Bishop Otto of Bamberg. The crypt was consecrated in 1041, the main altar in 1046 and the cathedral in 1061. It was the largest church of its time and, in its monumentality and significance, symbolized imperial power and Christianity. It became the primary church and mausoleum of the Salian dynasty and the burial place of eight German emperors and kings. With the Abbey of Cluny in ruins, the Speyer Cathedral remains the largest Romanesque church to this very day.

At the northeastern corner of the cathedral a palace (Pfalz) was added for the bishop and visiting royalty, completed around 1044/45. It had become a custom in Carolingian times that bishops expanded their residences in order to host kings or emperors on tour. The palace was 74 metres long, 16 metres wide and had three floors with heights of 6 metres each. It had its own chapel and was linked to the northeastern corner of the cathedral. The dimensions and elaborate architectural design were exceptional for profane buildings in the Salian era. A cloister and a number of buildings for the chapter and church administration were added on the southern side of the cathedral. Altogether, cathedral and additions presented a representative assembly of stately buildings with nothing comparable in the Salian empire.

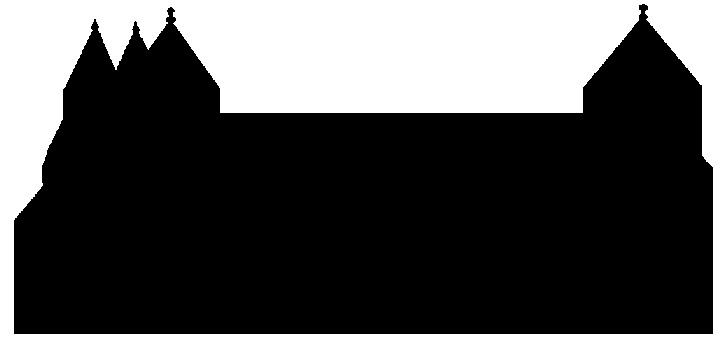
Cathedral profile northern side, Phase 1 (1061)

The extensive construction works drew many people to Speyer and expansions of the town became necessary. A new layout of streets developed that still exists today: three streets fanning out from the cathedral to the northwest, to the west and to the southwest. With its unusual width of up to 50 m the street going west from the cathedral became the “Via Triumphalis” (triumphal way), eventually with a length of 650 m (today Maximilianstrasse). Although the street has partially been narrowed, the original width is still visible on both ends, most notably between the cathedral and Alte Münz.

The first expansion of the town was by about 50 ha and the walls were completed around 1080. To the north, just east of today's train station, the suburb of Altspeyer including the Jewish quarter also had been walled.

Under the reign of the Salians three abbeys were established as endowments (see Stift): St. John's (later St. Guido) on the Weidenberg, a minor elevation between Speyer and the suburb of Altspeyer, St. Germain on the Germansberg, another small elevation outside of the town walls to the south and All-Saints within the city walls in the southern part of the town.

Conrad II died 4 June 1039 and was laid to rest in the cathedral which was still under construction. Young Henry III kept close ties to Speyer and often visited “his beloved Speyer”. He continued his father's work and endowed the cathedral generously. At the consecration of the main altar in 1046, he donated the evangelistary (gospel book) known as the Speyer Gospels (today in Madrid), in which it says "Spira fit insignis Heinrici munere regis (Speyer is awarded and elevated by the beneficial work of King Henry)". In 1043 Henry returned from his imperial crowning in Rome with the remains of beatified Guido of Pomposa. They were ceremoniously interred in the new abbey of St. John's, which later became the Stift of St. Guido. The cathedral was also presented with the skull of pope Stephanus, one of its two patron saints. Along with Goslar and Regensburg, Speyer became one of Henry's favorite residences in the empire. After his death he was buried on 28 October 1056 with great ceremony in the presence of Pope Victor II in the yet unfinished cathedral next to his father.

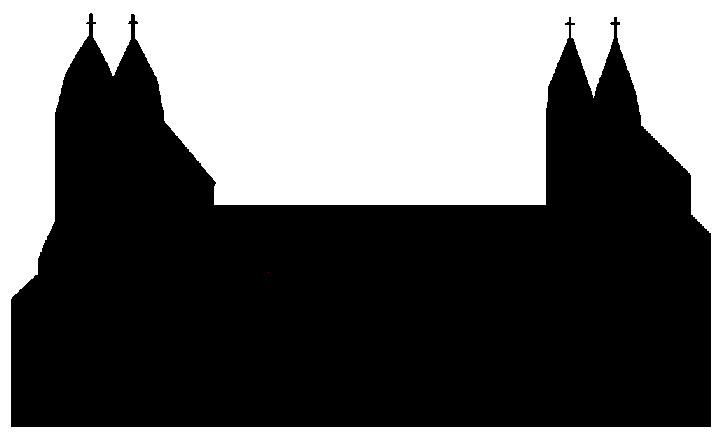
Cathedral profile northern side, Phase 2 (1135)

Work on the cathedral was continued by his widow, Agnes of Poitou and later by his son, Henry IV. He referred to the construction, embellishment and enrichment of the cathedral in the following terms: ”[...] ecclesiam Spirensem a nostris parentibus Cunrado imperatore augusto, avo videlicet nostro, et Heinrico imperatore augusto, patre videlicet nostro, et a nobis gloriose constructam veneramur et quam pluribus prediis et mancipiis diversisque ornamentis ad honorem dei sancteque dei genitricis Marie celebramus.” The cathedral received more valuable gifts from successors and other rulers. Byzantine Emperor Alexios I Komnenos (1081–1118) gave the cathedral a valuable antipendium (appendage which covers the entire front of the altar) in 1083 and Empress Beatrix (died 1184) donated a gold, silver and ivory reliquary cupboard.

The political relations between the Speyer and the empire intensified and Henry IV confirmed the charter of privileges (immunity charter) which had been granted to Speyer by his father. The Speyer bishops Heinrich I. von Scharfenberg (1067–1072), Rüdiger Huzmann (1073–1090), Johannes I., Graf im Kraichgau (1090–1104) and Bruno of Saarbrücken (1107–1123) were staunch supporters of Henry IV and Henry V in the Investiture Controversy. It was Bishop Huzmann who handed Pope Gregory VII the letter of deposition from Henry IV in 1076. Huzman also accompanied Henry IV in December that same year on his voyage from Speyer to Canossa and Bishop Bruno in his capacity of imperial chancellor who negotiated the Concordat of Worms with Pope Callixtus II in 1122. Huzman remained excommunicated for life because of his partisanship for the emperor.

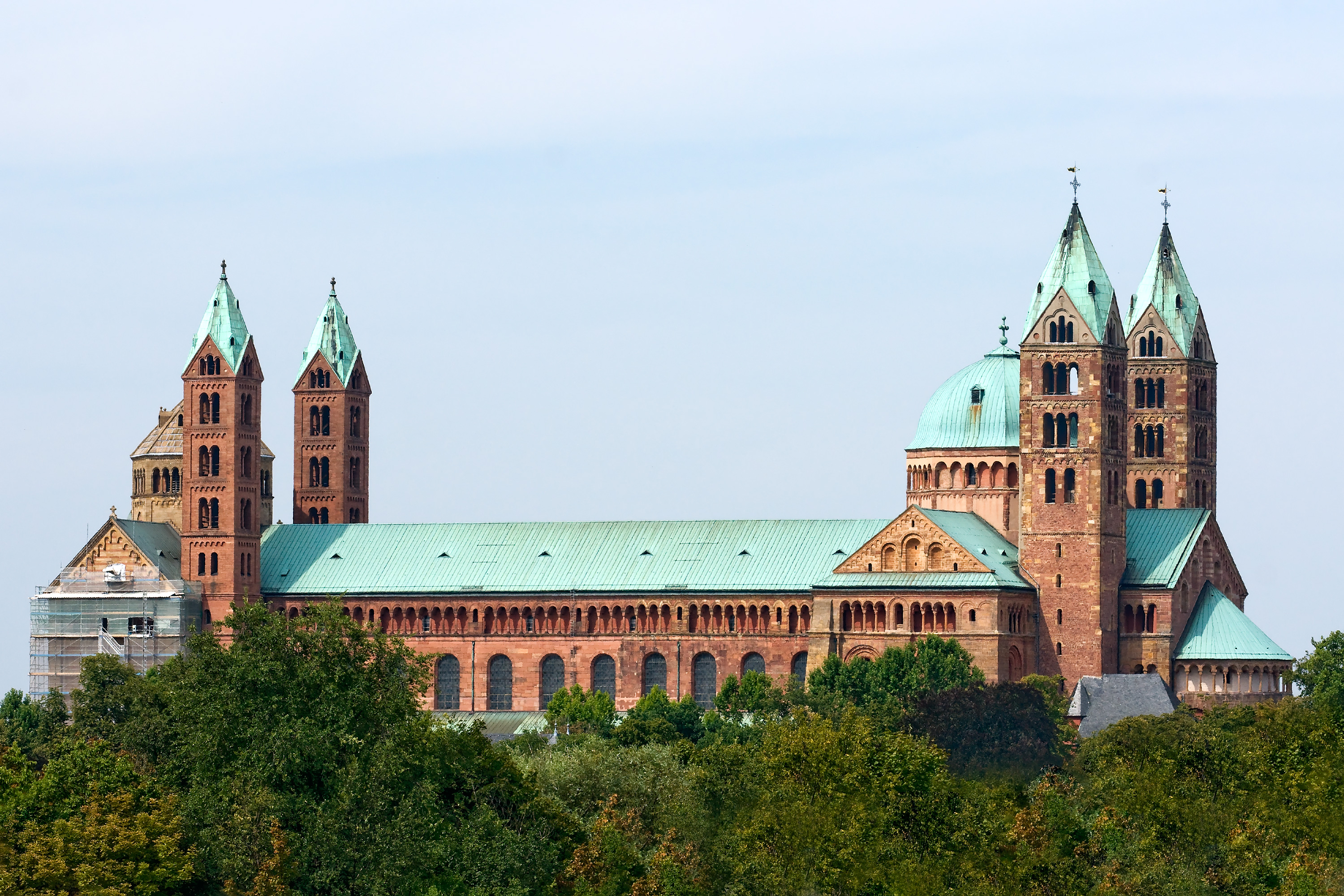
Speyer Cathedral southern side

In 1080, Henry VI commissioned considerable changes to the cathedral (Speyer II) bringing another spurt in growth for the town. Until 1102 the eastern sections of the building were demolished leaving only the lower floors and the crypt of Speyer I intact. The nave was elevated by five metres and the flat wooden ceiling replaced with a groin vault of square bays at an elevation of 33 metres representing one of the outstanding achievements of Romanesque architecture.

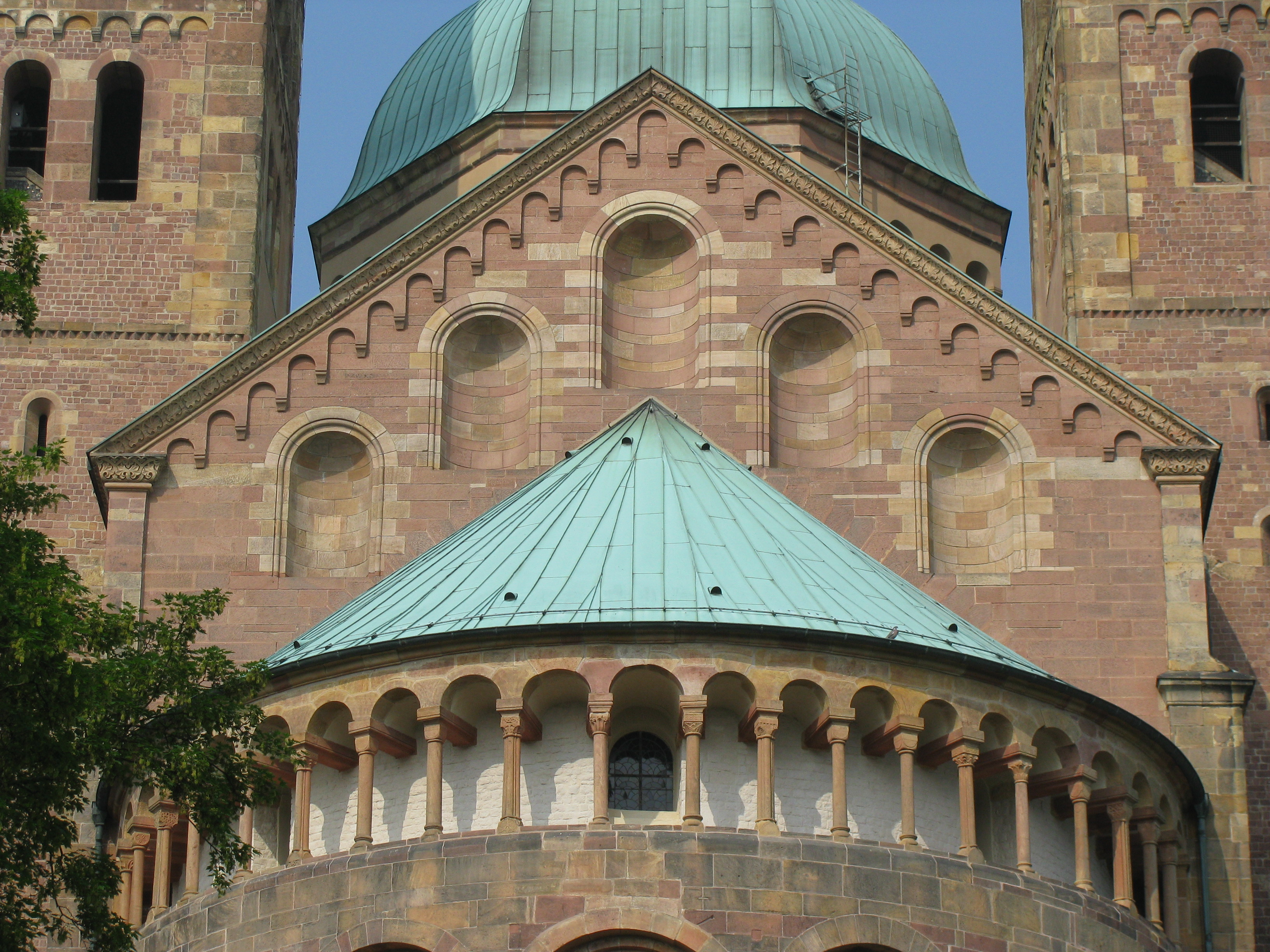
The eastern apsidal end, showing encircling gallery

The result was “an interior of monumental power, albeit stark and prismatic when compared with contemporary French buildings, but one which conveys an impression of Roman gravitas, an impression singularly appropriate for a ruler with the political pretensions of Henry IV.” With a length of 444 Roman feet (134 metres) and a width of 111 Roman feet (43 metres) it was one of the largest buildings of its time. The building became a political issue: the enlargement of the cathedral in the small village of Speyer with previously only around 500 inhabitants was a blunt provocation for the papacy. The emperor not only laid claim to secular but also to ecclesiastical power and with the magnificence and splendour of this cathedral he underlined this bold demand. The purpose of the building, already a strong motive for Conrad, was the emperor's "claim to a representative imperial Roman architecture" in light of the continuing struggle with Pope Gregory VII. Thus, the Speyer Cathedral is also seen as a symbol of the Investiture Controversy. The expanded cathedral was completed in 1106, the year Henry IV died in Liège. Because of his excommunication, he was first put to rest in the unconsecrated Afra chapel of the cathedral. It was only in 1111, when Henry IV's excommunication was revoked that his son, Henry V, had the body moved into the cathedral alongside his predecessors.

In the beginning of the following century, another expansion of the town became necessary. Between 1200 and 1230, the staple market at the Speyerbach (today Fishmarket Square) was included within the city walls. The foundation of new parish churches such as St. Bartholomew, St. Jacob and St. Peter is an indication of a growing population. As of the end of the 11th century, Spira became the only name used for the town. Until then, “civitas Spira vel Nemeta” or just “Nemetum” was used in documents.

Conrad II and his predecessors furnished the cathedral chapter with estates and reeve rights with which it had a successful and strong economical base. These assets included the area of Bruchsal with Lusshard Forest and possessions scattered along the upper Neckar River, in the northern Black Forest, in modern-day Palatine and in the Kraichgau district as well as farther away in the Hunsrück Mountains, the Nahe Hills and the Hessian Mountains. By and by, Henry IV added possessions in the Wetterau and Nahegau districts, in the valley of the river Rems, in Saxony and with the counties of Lutramsforst (southern Palatine Forest) and Forchheim. Virtually the whole district of Speyergau was gradually transferred into the hands of the church.

In 1084, in a document concerning the settlement of Jews in Speyer the inhabitants of Speyer for the first time are regarded as “cives” (citizens of a town). In the years to come, Speyer developed an autonomous municipal law. In another document of Henry IV dating 1101, this law is referred to as “ius civile” or “ius civium”. Speyer's Rhine harbour at mouth of the Speyerbach is first mentioned in 1084. Along the upper Rhine, the staple market of Speyer was third in size and Speyer was the largest trading centre for wine. Other commodities were cloth, spices, grains, fruit, grindstones, pottery and arms.

Bishop Huzmann's successor in 1090 was a nephew and confidant of Henry IV, John Count in Kraichgau. During his tenure his bishopric received additional estates in the area of Rastatt. Henry died 1106 in Liège and was first put to rest in the unconsecrated chapel of St. Afra adjoining the cathedral. His son, Henry V had him ceremoniously transferred into the royal chancel of the cathedral proper on August 14, 1111.

== Jewish community ==
In 1084, the first recorded Jewish community emerged in Speyer at the instigation of the Bishop Rüdiger Huzmann. It is quite possible that Jews already settled in Speyer in pre-Christian times. The bishop invited Jews to move to Speyer and settled them in the former suburb of Altspeyer which he had surrounded by a wall for their protection. Along with this invitation the bishop granted the Jews rights and privileges which went well beyond contemporary practice. These rights were confirmed by Henry IV in 1090 and became an example for Jews' privileges in many cities of the empire. A Jewish quarter soon also developed next to the bishops' district near the cathedral. Its centre, the Jews' Court (Judenhof), contained a men's and a women's synagogue and the mikveh. The ruins of the Speyer Synagogue are the oldest visible remnants of such a building in central Europe. The mikveh, first mentioned in 1126, has remained almost unchanged to this day and is still supplied by fresh groundwater.

For two centuries the Speyer Jewish community was among the most important of the Empire and, in spite of pogroms, persecution and expulsion, had considerable influence on Ashkenazi culture and the spiritual and cultural life of the town. Nevertheless, anti-Semitism and persecution was no less virulent in Speyer than in other places and with one notable exception the Jewish community shared the fate of most others.

The Yiddish surnames of Spira, Shapira, Spier and Shapiro probably derive from Shpira (שפירא), the Hebrew name of Speyer.

== The Great Freedom Charter of 1111 ==
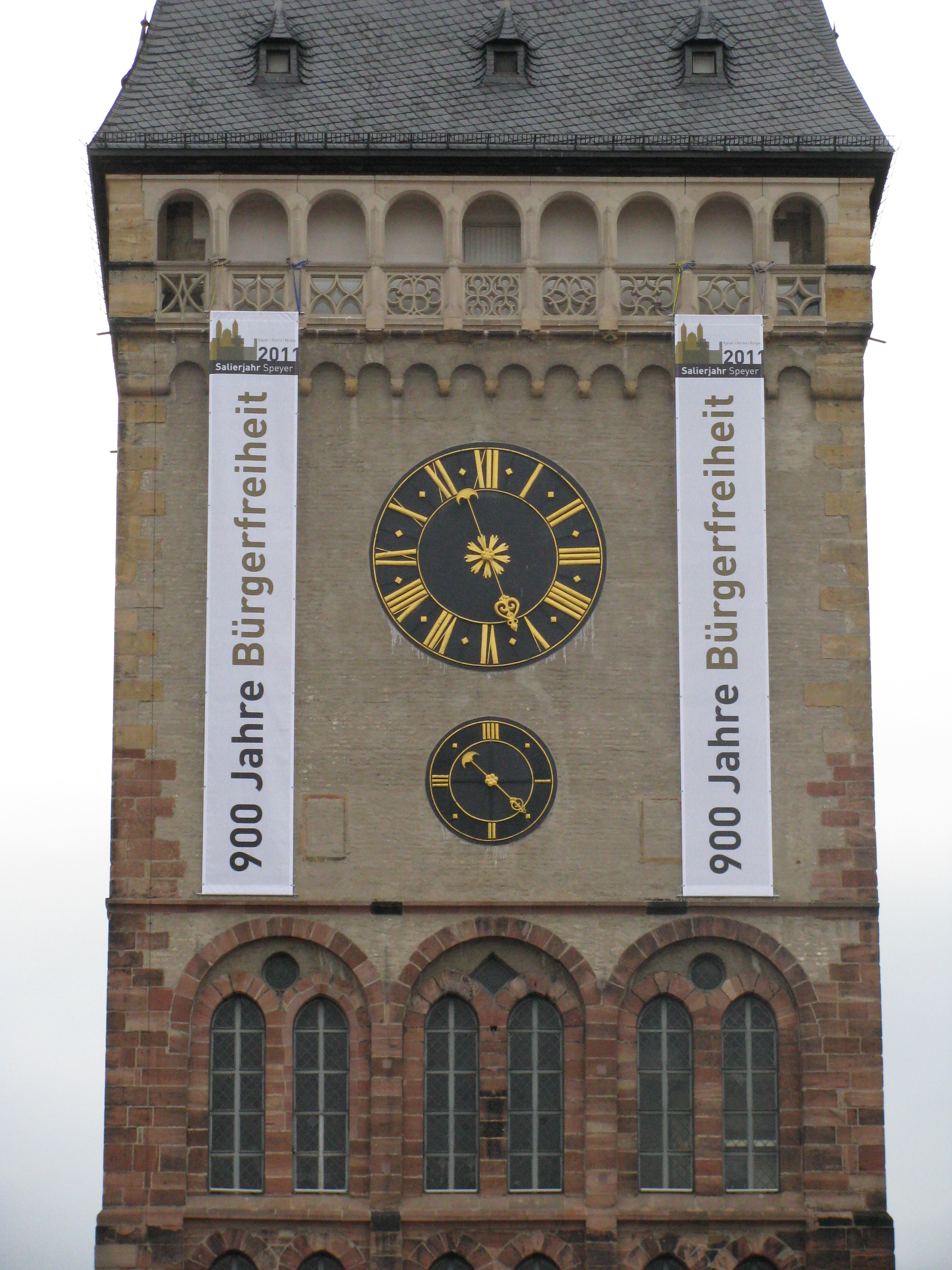
Speyer celebrating 900 years of civic freedom in 2011

On August 14, 1111, the day of his father's funeral in the Speyer cathedral, Henry V granted the city extraordinary privileges. Speyer became the first city in the Holy Roman Empire in which its citizens were granted personal freedoms as laid out in the Great Freedom Charter. For Speyer this marked a big step in the development of becoming a free imperial city. In its solemn foreword the charter said: “As, with the grace of God and the support of the city in memory of our forefathers and because of the steadfast loyalty of its citizens to us, we have resolved to rise before other cities, we decided to consolidate their rights through the power of the emperor on the council of the princes.” The emperor's image and the charter was inscribed in golden letters above the portal of the cathedral. The inscription was later lost when the cathedral was damaged.

Among other things, the charter freed the citizens of Speyer from the oppressive inheritance tax, from duties and the fees and tolls of the city and it granted the right to be heard when coins were to be devaluated. The charter became a precondition for a free citizenry with a unified legal status, e. g. protection of property. It was an example for similar rights later granted to other cities in the empire and also highlighted the emperor's interest in strengthening the citizenry as a counterweight against the power of the bishops.

In 1116, the Speyer Bishop Bruno of Saarbrücken (1107–1123) sided with the princes who opposed Henry V in the Investiture Controversy under the leadership of Archbishop Adalbert I of Mainz. The city of Speyer remaining loyal to Henry V chased the bishop out of town. This was the first recorded political action of the Speyer citizenry. As imperial chancellor of Henry V the bishop negotiated the Concordat of Worms with pope Calixtus II in 1122, ending the Investiture Controversy.

Henry, having come to terms with the pope, died 1125 without children in Utrecht and was the last Salian emperor to be interred in the Speyer cathedral. As with Henry IV, Speyer had been one of his favourite residences.

== The Staufer dynasty ==
In the ensuing struggle for the royal crown the Welf candidate sponsored by the archbishop of Mainz, Lothar III succeeded to the throne on 13 September 1125. Speyer again supported the rival Staufer king, later Conrad III, and again, chased a bishop, this time Siegfried II of Wolfsölden (1127–1146), out of town for his support of the Welf. The Staufers took refuge in Speyer. In the Imperial Chronicle it says that they expressed their gratitude by making it their principal town. In 1128 King Lothar and Archbishop Adalbert put Speyer, which by then must have been totally surrounded by walls, under siege and it had to surrender short of starvation.

Lothar III stayed in Speyer twice for longer periods of time in 1135 and 1136. After his death in 1138 the Staufer Conrad III. ascended to the throne. He continued the practice of the Salians in keeping a common residence with the bishops in Speyer and the cathedral school as an imperial chancellery. The emperor also continued to rely on the support of the Speyer bishops holding most important offices of the empire. The cathedral school evolved into the “Diplomat School” of the empire and many clerics of the cathedral endowment were also in the service of the imperial chancellery.

The Christmas sermons of Bernard of Clairvaux in the Speyer cathedral induced Conrad III, who was in town for the imperial diet of 1146, to participate in the Second Crusade. Two brass plates in the cathedral commemorate this event.

In 1182, Conrad's nephew, Frederick I confirmed and expanded the privileges for Speyer granted in 1111. The script is the oldest document in the Speyer city archives. Unlike the people of Speyer, the inhabitants of the prince-bishopric outside the city walls remained serfs of the bishop under the old inheritance law well into modern history. Frederick had planned to be interred in the cathedral after his death but never returned from the Third Crusade. Therefore, his second wife Beatrice of Burgundy and his little daughter Agnes were put to rest in the cathedral in 1184.

The crown passed to Frederick's son Henry VI whose reign was marked by the dispute with the church, opposing princes and by the secession of Sicily. In December 1192, Richard I of England was taken captive near Vienna on his return from the Third Crusade and handed over to Henry IV in Speyer on March 28, 1193, who imprisoned him in Trifels Castle for almost a year until England paid a royal ransom of 150,000 marks (65,000 pounds of silver). Presumably it was in this time, that Henry IV granted the town the liberty to elect a council of twelve citizens from their midst. The original document is lost but the privilege was confirmed in January 1198 by Philip of Swabia in a contract with the city. Thus, with the apparent approval of the bishop, Philip legitimatized the city council charter, which also made its way in Lübeck, Utrecht and Strasbourg around the turn of the century. It was another important step to become an independent city and once again underlined the emperor's interest in strengthening an urban society. It is especially remarkable, that the twelve councilors were neither appointed by the bishop nor were they required to swear an oath on him. Unless any kind of council existed before, this date marks the birth of the Speyer city council. Henry VI died 1197 in Messina and was interred in the Cathedral of Palermo.

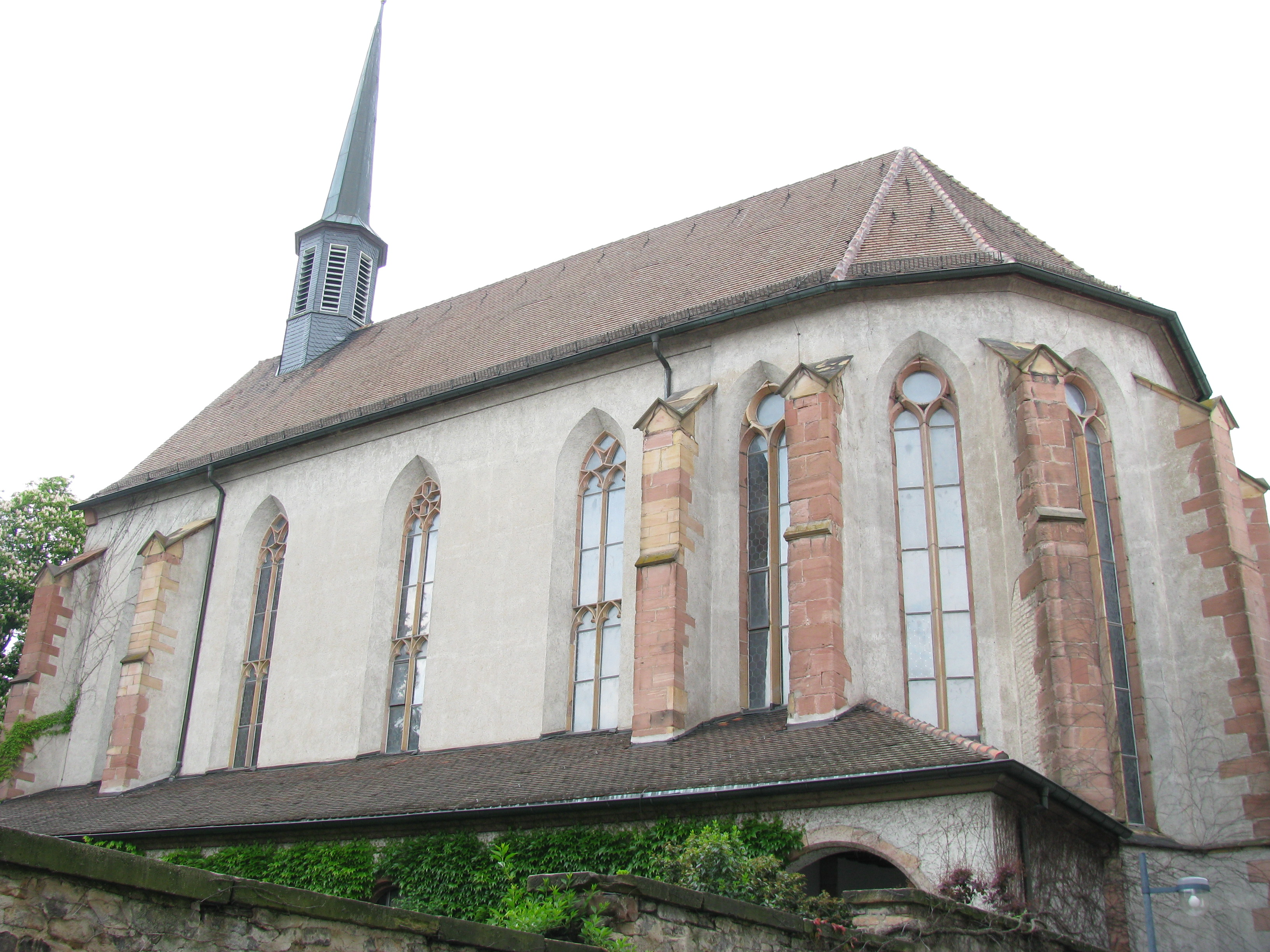
St. Ludwig church, Korngasse

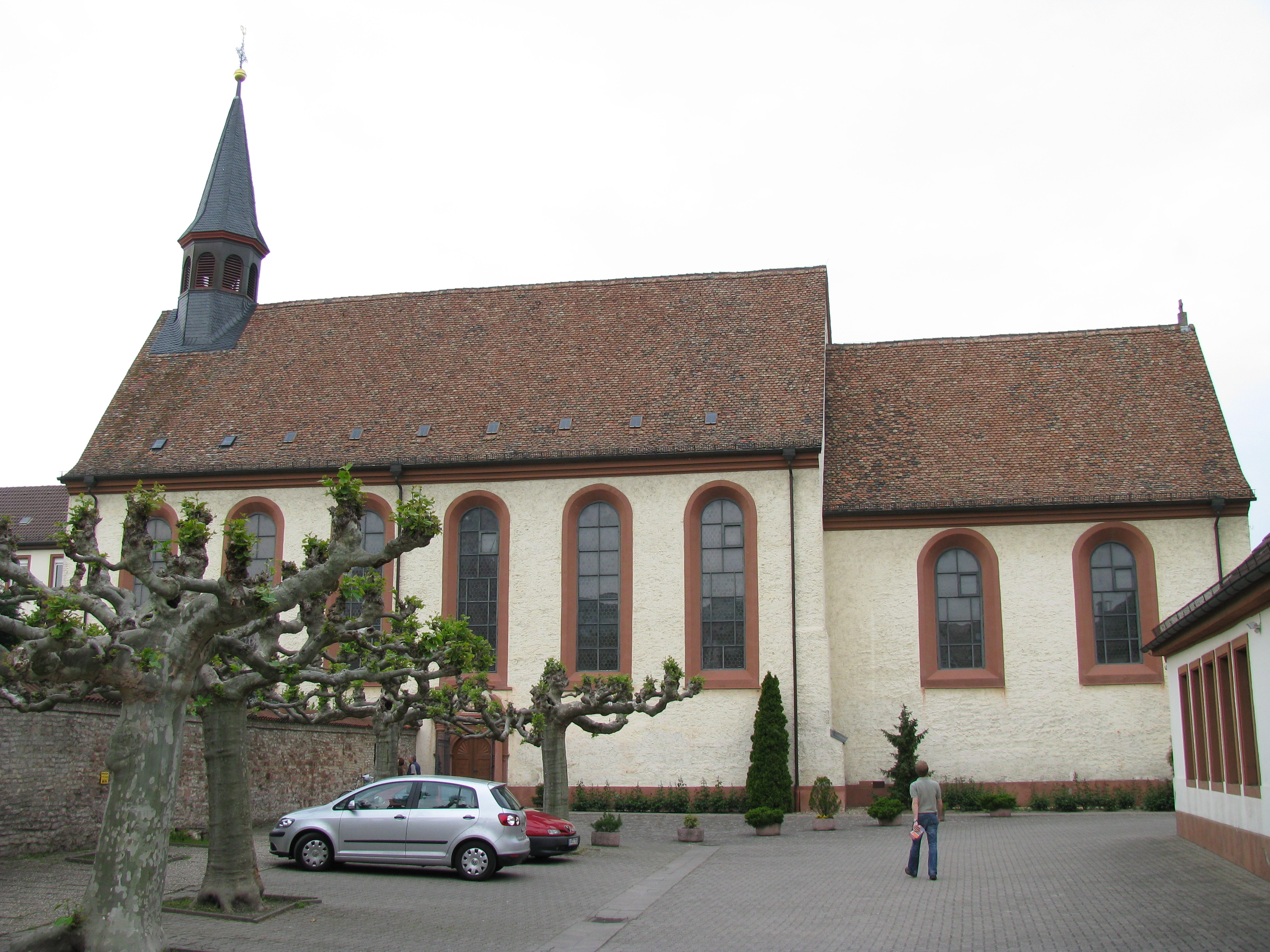
Church of St. Magdalen Monastery

Henry's three-year-old son was too young to take the crown, and a struggle between Staufers and Welfs for the throne ensued. In the treaty of 1198 mentioned above, Speyer again sided with the Staufers and agreed to mutual aid with Henry's youngest brother, Philip of Swabia. His supporters crowned him that same year, while Otto IV of Brunswick was crowned as the candidate of the Welfs. In the spring of 1199, the princes supporting the Staufers assembled in Speyer to affirm Philipp's right to the crown. In a note of protest to the pope they denounced his right to participate in the election of the German king, not to mention to declare it legitimate. They demanded that the Pope no longer infringe on the imperial rights in Italy. The princes threatened to come to Rome in order to enforce Philipp's coronation as emperor. Unimpressed, Pope Innocent III confirmed Otto's coronation in 1201 after Otto promised him territories in Italy (Oath of Neuss). That same year, Otto besieged Speyer without success, where his opponent Philip sojourned. In 1205, Philip held a diet in Speyer and, after he beat Otto in battle in 1206, the tide in the power struggle turned in his favour. Yet, in 1208, in the presence of Speyer Bishop Conrad III of Scharfenberg, Philip was killed in Bamberg by the Count Palatine of Bavaria. Otto IV, becoming king after all, tried to make amends with Speyer by confirming the privileges of 1111, but in vain. In the Treaty of Speyer of 22 March 1209 he renewed his promise to the pope (Oath of Neuss) about the territories in Italy which he never held.

As of 1207, important functions of the city were taken by citizens and from that time on the council used its own seal. With these privileges, Speyer continued to lead the way in the empire. The role of the city council consolidated during the 13th century and a city court evolved.

In 1213, at a diet in Speyer, Otto IV's successor and Henry IV's son, Frederick II had his uncle, Philipp of Swabia, ceremoniously interred in the cathedral. Under his reign, the cathedral school evolved into the diplomat school of the empire. The Speyer Bishop Conrad III of Scharfenberg, Imperial Chancellor 1200 to 1224, accompanied Frederick in 1220 to the crowning ceremony in Rome. That same year, a hospital run by the Teutonic Order is documented in Speyer. In 1221, the Franciscan Cesarius of Speyer began his mission in Germany.

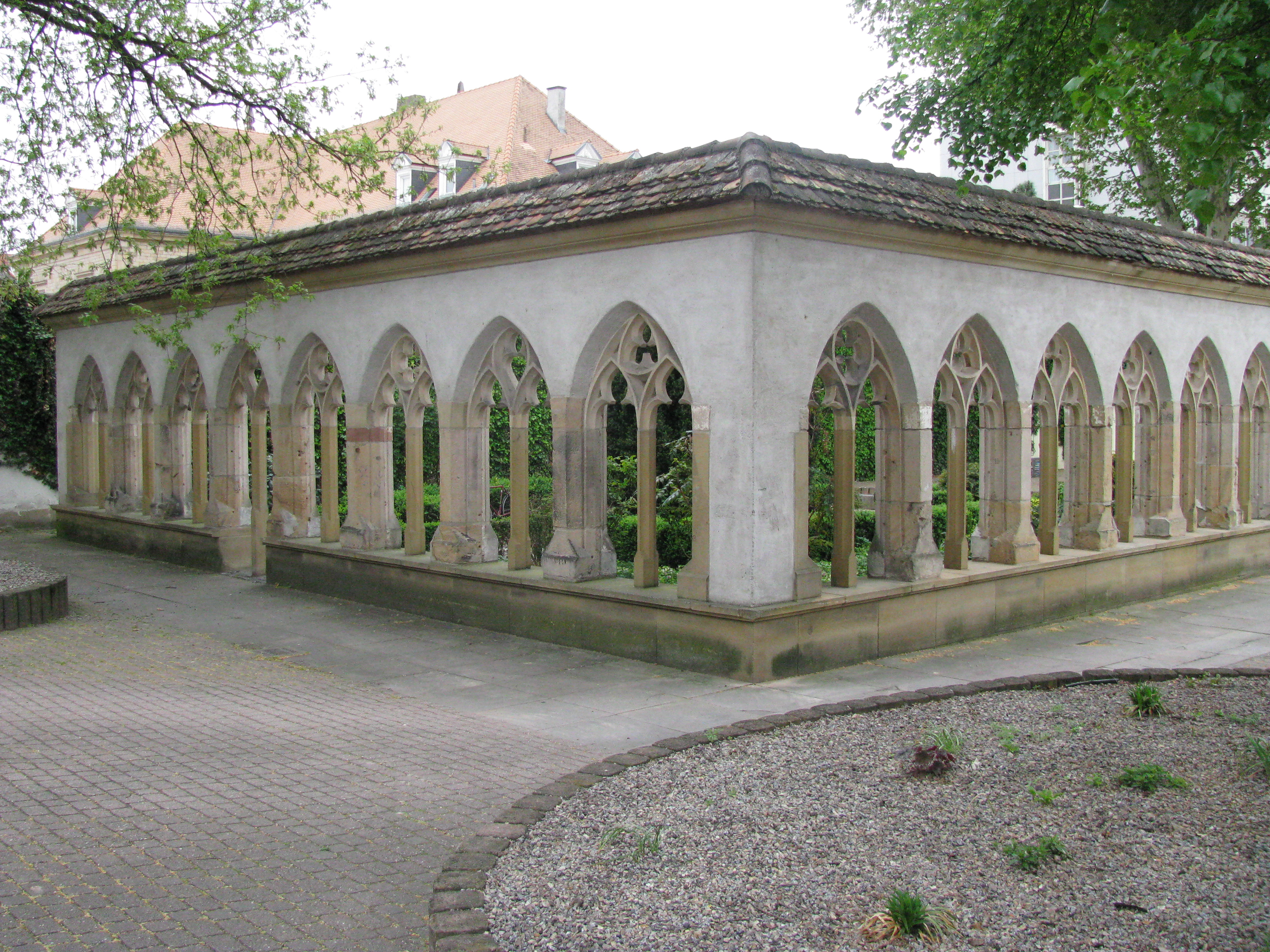
Remnants of the Augustine monastery in Hagedornsgasse

The 13th century in Speyer was characterised by the struggle for power in the city. In the beginning there were more and more signs that the city council increasingly acted independently and that its constitution took on institutional traits. In 1120, the city council was referred to as universitas consiliariorum and in 1224 as consiliarii Spirensis cum universo eorum collegio. In 1226 and 1227, for the first time, it signed contracts in its own name, e. g. with Strasbourg. Eventually, legal jurisdiction (cognisance) passed over from the church to the city. During the throne quarrel of Frederick II, the cities were encouraged to more independence. In the mid-1220s, Speyer joined a federation of cities with Mainz, Worms, Bingen, Frankfurt, Gelnhausen and Friedberg. Yet, mainly at the instigation of the church, this federation was prohibited at the diet of the new imperial regent, Louis I, Duke of Bavaria in November 1226. In 1230, with the consent of the bishop, the council decreed the first Speyer town law. It concerned violations against peace and order in the city. In that context, for the first time, two mayors of Speyer are mentioned. In 1237, the city council appears as independently acting institution, referring to itself as Consules et universi cives Spirenses.

In the 13th century a number of monasteries settled in Speyer. In 1207 the Order of the Holy Sepulchre took over the monastery of the Augustinian nuns which was located in the suburb of Altspeyer. Cistercians established a monastery on the site of today's Wittelsbacher Hof on Ludwigstrasse in 1212. It was a branch of the renowned Eusserthal Abbey in the Palatine Forest. Cistercians from the Maulbronn Monastery took over the “Maulbronner Hof” on Johannesstrasse. In 1228, Magdalen nuns from St. Leon settled in Speyer and later requested to be accepted into the Dominican Order. Their monastery St. Magdalen is the oldest still in existence in Speyer today. By 1230 there was a Franciscan monastery on today's Ludwigstrasse and that year Teutonic Knights took over a hospital on the site of today's consistory. In 1262 the Dominicans came to Speyer; their church was today's Ludwigskirche in Korngasse. Augustinians built a monastery at today's Willi-Brandt-Platz around the middle of the century, Carmelites had a monastery at today's Postplatz and in 1299 Poor Clares started one on St. Klara-Kloster-Weg. Many monasteries maintained trade posts in other cities; in Speyer alone there were 19 such posts, 12 of which belonged to various Cistercian abbeys.

== Speyer cathedral chapter ==
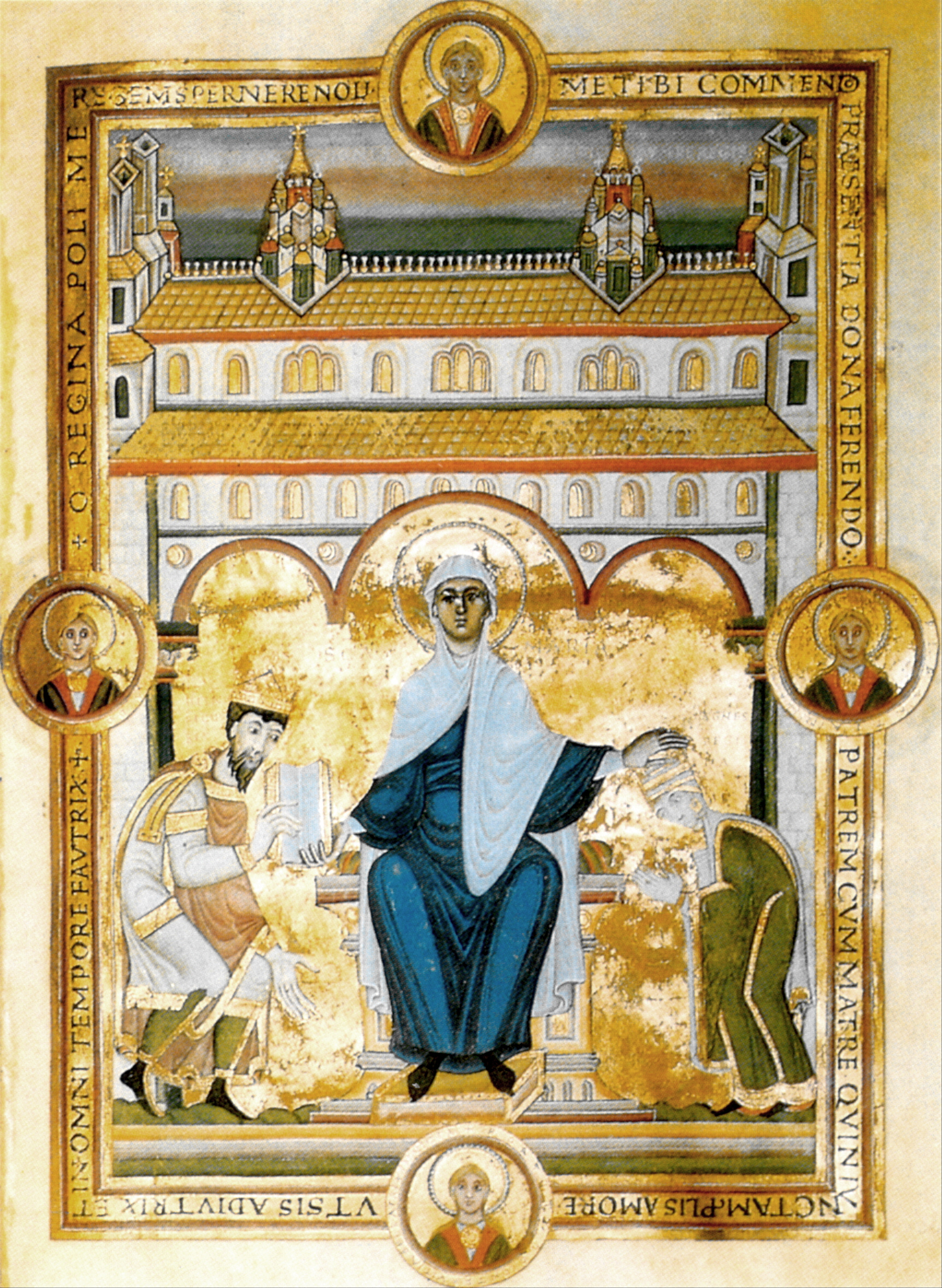
Codex Aureus (Speyer Gospel Book) (1043–1046), Henry III. and Agnes kneeling before the Virgin Mary and the Speyer Cathedral in the background. This precious work was kept in the chapter library and today is in Madrid.

The Speyer cathedral chapter (Domkapitel, capitulum) was an ecclesiastical corporate body of approximately 30 canons, or clergy ordained for religious duties in the church. The chapter mainly assisted the bishop to govern the diocese, but formed a body distinct from him, with the authority to make its own statutes and regulations. The chapter elected the bishop and ruled the diocese during episcopal vacancies. The chapter eventually became wholly aristocratic in composition and in 1484 the pope decreed that only members of the nobility or aristocracy were to be admitted. The nobility of the city strove to have a family member in the chapter.

The chapter owned property and appointed officials to administer its possessions which were not under the control of the bishop. Henry III, who made several donations of property to the chapter in 1041 and 1046, even specified with the first of these that the bishop was to be excluded from its administration. Each capitular canon (Domkapitular or Domherr, canonicus capitularis) had the right to a prebend (Pfründe) or income and was required to reside near the cathedral church, unless granted leave. Each canon had to perform his duties personally, including choir service. Head of the chapter was originally the cathedral provost (Dompropst, praepositus), the highest dignitary after the bishop. From the end of the 12th century, leadership passed to the cathedral dean (Domdekan, decanus). The chapter was an important factor in the city's economy because it operated various administrative departments (cellar, barn, granary, portal, factory, ornaments, and bakery), staffed by cathedral vicars (Domvikare, vicarii) who carried out their duties under the supervision of a capitular canon. There were approximately seventy vicars associated with the Speyer cathedral.

Library of the cathedral chapter

Three libraries were associated with the cathedral: the cathedral library, comprising liturgical books and books forming part of the cathedral treasure, such as the codex aureus, the palace library of the bishop (as of c. 1381 in Udenheim) and the library of the cathedral chapter, the largest of the three. In August 1552 Speyer was occupied by troops of the margrave of Brandenburg-Kulmbach. They plundered the cathedral and its associated buildings. The margrave had in mind to hand the books to his stepfather and had them brought to the nearby house of the Deutsche Orden. But the books were saved for the library owing to the hurried departure of the troops on 24 August. All the known and extant copies of the Notitia Dignitatum, a unique document of the Roman imperial chanceries and one of the very few surviving documents of Roman government, are derived, either directly or indirectly, from the Codex Spirensis which is known to have existed in the library of the cathedral chapter. The codex contained a collection of documents (of which the Notitia was the last and largest document, occupying 164 pages) that brought together several previous documents of which one was of the 9th century. It is last attested in the available documents in 1550–1551.

== Escalating controversy between city and church ==
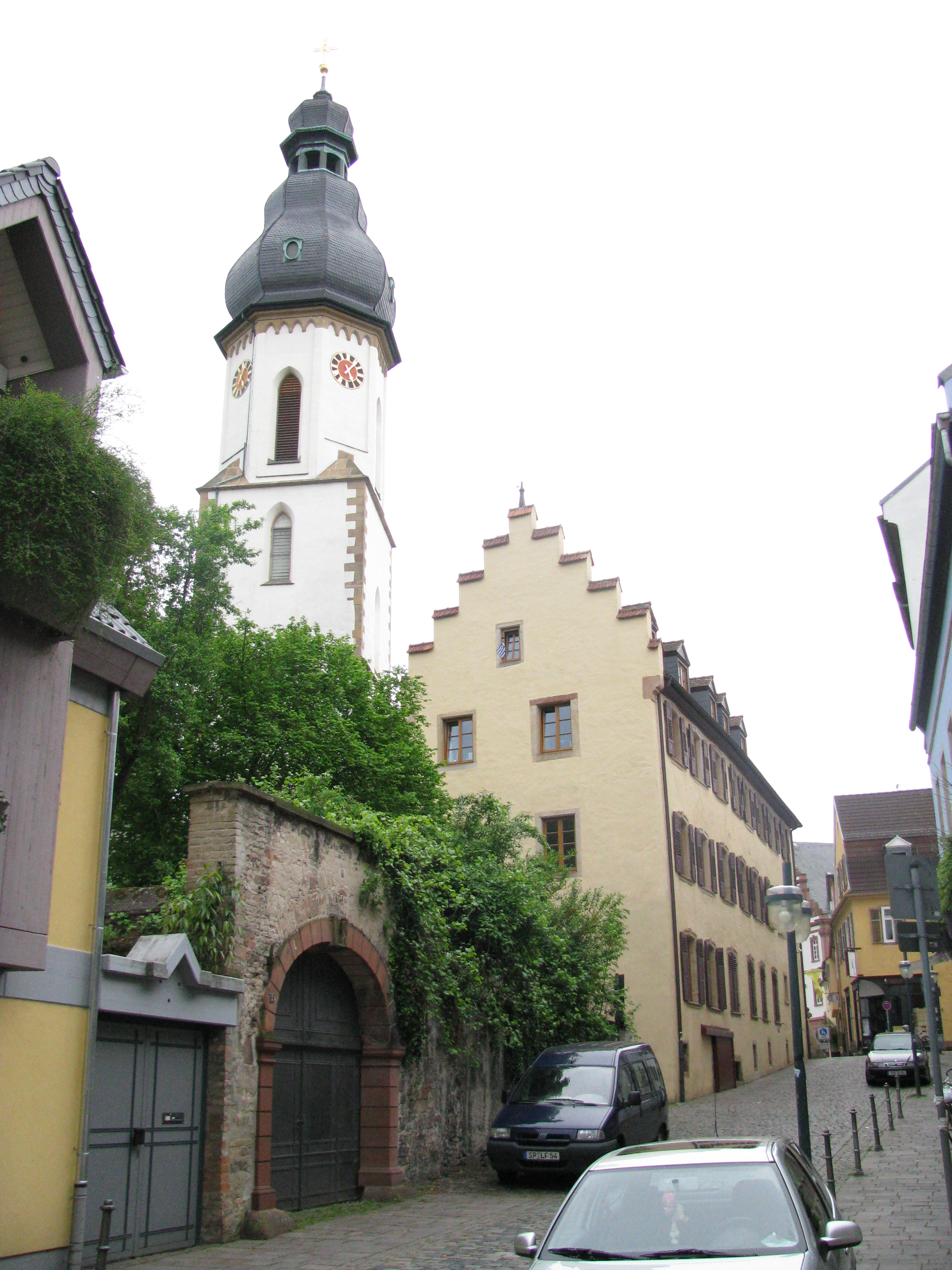
Former town hospital, founded 1259 (back entrance) and bell tower of St. George's Church in the background

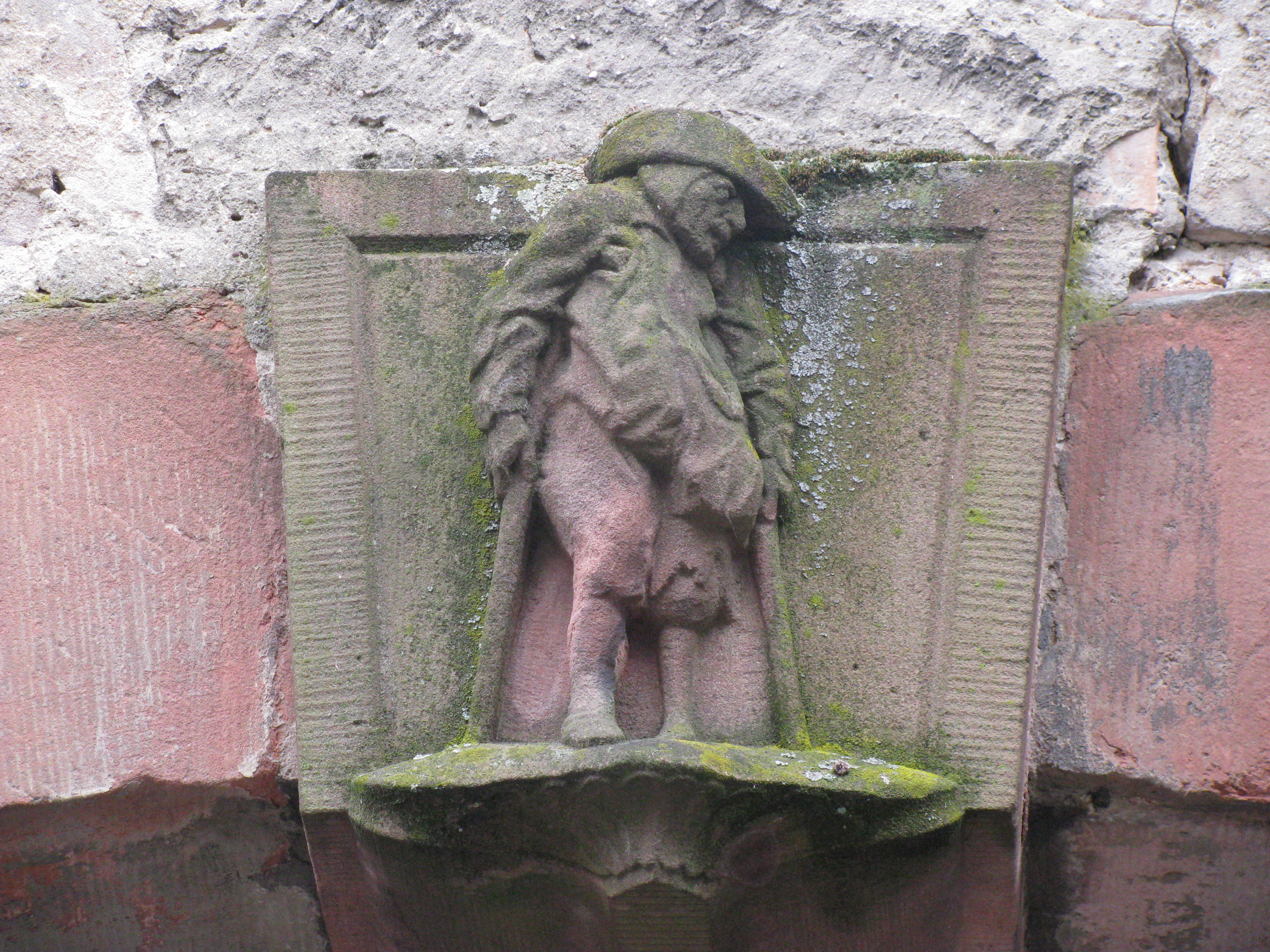
Keystone in the gate of the former town hospital depicting a beggar with stilts

The second half of the 13th century was characterised by the fierce disputes between city and bishop and, most of all, between city and the ecclesiastical endowments. The disputes were yet intensified by the Investiture Controversy. The four Speyer collegiate endowments (Cathedral Chapter, St. Germain, Weiden Stift and Trinity Stift) were a major unified force in the city representing all the priests as ecclesiae Spirenses and vying with the bishop and the city for power. They didn't even shrink from adulterating their own history to achieve their aims which were not always the same as the bishop's.

Especially the cathedral chapter evolved into the actual adversary of the Speyer citizenry. There were frequent threats against each other, economic sanctions, punitive and counter measures concerning taxes and revenues. The church neither wanted to forego revenues nor pay dues to the city. In turn, the citizenry refused payments to the church. Bishop Beringer of Entringen, for example, threatened to excommunicate those citizens that did not fulfill their interest payments to the Speyer canons. The power struggle between the pope and the emperor added to the heat of this conflict. The citizenry always sided with the emperor while the clergy took sides with the pope. Emperor and pope rewarded their followers with privileges. Thus, in 1239, Frederick II returned the Speyerbach to the city and permission for the fall fair in 1245 must be seen in that light. In 1239 and 1244, the popes Gregory IX and Innocent confirmed estates in Heiligenstein and Deidesheim and extensive rights for the cathedral chapter. On July 30, 1246, Pope Innocent even took people and estates of the cathedral under his special protection. At this, Frederick II ordered the expulsion of the clergy from Speyer. It is not known whether this order was executed.

A time of uncertainty and insecurity followed after Pope Innocent deposed Frederick II in 1245 and especially after the death of Frederick II and of his successor, Conrad IV in 1254 (Interregnum), lasting until Rudolf I of Germany was elected in 1273. In July 1254, Speyer and 58 other cities created the Rhenish League of Cities and Princes which proclaimed a general Landfrieden for 10 years. The cities also signed an agreement about taxes. This league put the cities in a position to demand the confirmation of privileges from the king and or pope for conduct in their favour. This was the case with William II of Holland in 1254 and 1255 and Richard of Cornwall in 1258. Yet, the alliance dissolved again in 1257. In 1258, Speyer arranged with Worms to acknowledge the ambivalent election of Alfonso X of Castile instead of Richard of Cornwall. Should Alfonso not accept the election, Speyer and Worms would vote for another king.

In the mid-13th century it is documented for the first time that there was “public property” in the form of city-owned real estate. The city councillor and member of the minters guild, Ulrich Klüpfel, bestowed the city with estates and rights in Böhl and Iggelheim (today: Böhl-Iggelheim which became the base of the first civic endowment in Speyer, the “Spital” (infirmary).

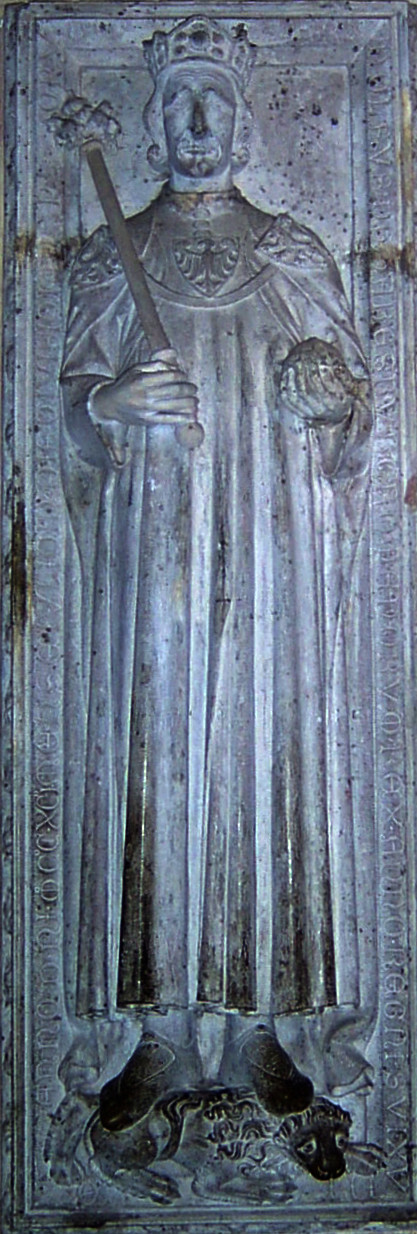
Rudolf of Habsburg, tomb slab in Speyer Cathedral

In the eyes of the collegiate endowments, it was the bishops' leniency towards the city that caused the erosion of church power in the city. This leniency was vehemently opposed, especially by the cathedral chapter which felt impaired by the octroi levied by the city. Bishop Henry of Leiningen had yielded to the city the right to collect octroi on wine for 5 years. In return, the city council abstained from the free election of the council which had been conceded to it long ago. Yet, for the collegiate endowments this concession by the bishop went too far and in 1264 they formed an alliance against this agreement. The occasion was that citizens of Speyer allegedly destroyed buildings and plantations of the endowment clergy and that the church felt exposed to harassment. As a counter measure they decided that neither council members, other citizens or their relatives down to the fourth generation would be allowed to become canons or friars of the Speyer church or to receive benefices. The octroi still would not be paid. In 1264/65 some council members and citizens revolted, in part also against the council's compliance with the bishop. Not only the endowment clergy but also the episcopalian court house, citizens and Jews were subject to violence. This revolt constituted the first open and serious resistance of at least a part of the citizenry against the bishop and the clergy. The leaders with their families and backers were banished from the city in December 1265 and found refuge with the Count of Leiningen. Yet, the tension between clergy and citizenry continued.

In 1265, the Imperial immediacy of Speyer was confirmed which implied that the city was considered a “shining example” for other cities. Pope Clement IV in turn confirmed all privileges so far given to the Speyer church which included exemption from worldly dues.

Shortly after his election, King Rudolf held a diet in Speyer in 1273 in which he confirmed the 1182 privilege of Frederick II to “his citizens”. Without success he advocated the restitution of the rebels which had been banished from the city. Under the reign of Rudolf, Speyer served as an example for city foundations and elevations of city statuses, e. g. Neutstadt (1275), Germersheim (1276), Heilbronn (1281) or Godramstein (1285). With Otto of Bruchsal, provost of St. Guido, clergyman from Speyer became court chancellor of the king.

In 1275, the city chamberlain tried to bring the cathedral clergy before a secular court. In turn, he was banished by the church, yet without consequences, as he remained a member of the city council. In the meantime there were quarrels not only about the octroi but about wine serving and dues on the export of grain. As the church continued to refuse any payments the city decreed a ban on exports. On Good Friday in 1277, cathedral deacon Albert of Mussbach was murdered. The perpetrator(s) were never caught and possibly even covered by the city. The pope demanded the investigation of the complaints by the church of Speyer and the city expanded its measures against the clergy. The citizens were forbidden to buy wine from the church. Bakers were not allowed to grind their grain in mills owned by the church. In addition, the city began construction of 2 towers by the cathedral and next to the houses of the endowment clergy. In 1279, the endowments complained to the pope that the city demanded payment of a buying and sales tax, that it forbade its citizens to buy wine in their buildings and that it banned the export of wine and grain for the purpose of avoiding the market and sales taxes. On April 13, 1280, the bishop felt impelled to yield. With his pledge to respect all privileges of the city, for the first time he unconditionally acknowledged the privileges of Speyer. The city immediately proceeded to safeguard its power by engaging the military service of knight John of Lichtenstein against all enemies for 1 year. Lichtenstein loaned 1/3 of Lichtenstein castle and Kropsburg castle (both in Palatine Forest) to the city. On this occasion, the 4 endowments again unified their forces to defend their rights and privileges in Speyer.

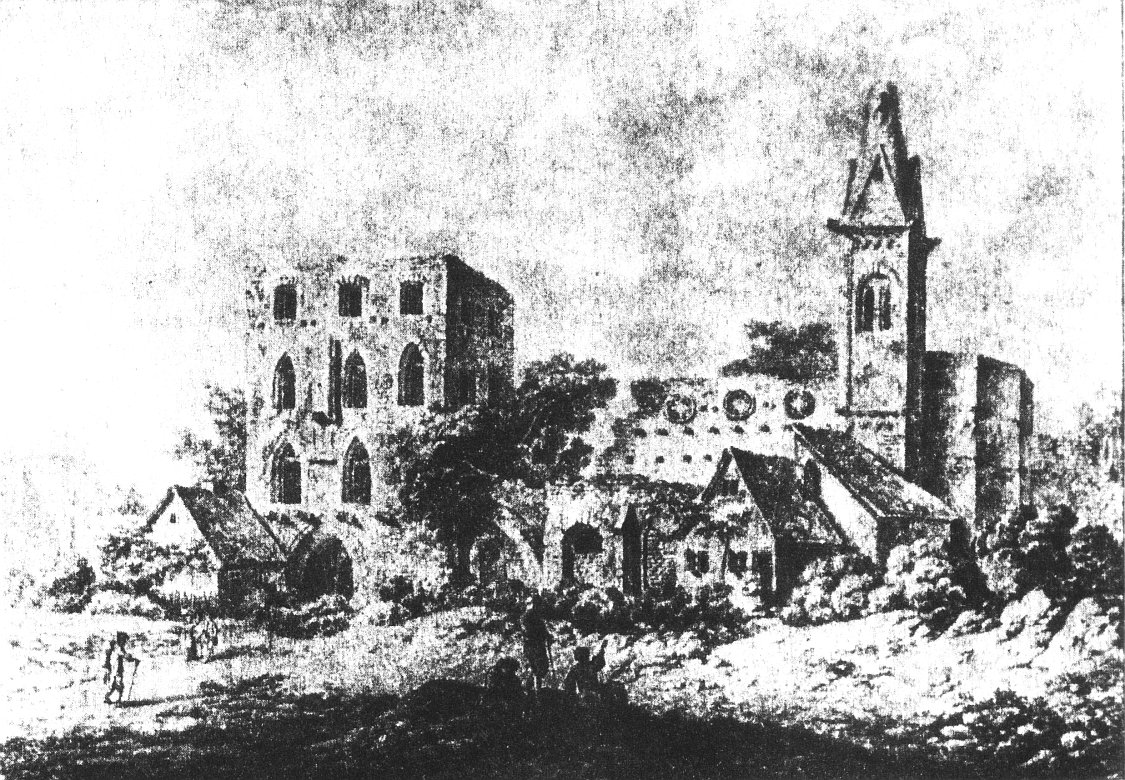
Nikolaus chapel and Domstaffel tower

This economic warfare grew in intensity. In an arbitration by King Rudolf on October 21, 1284, it is stated that the ban on the export of grain was renewed after the clergy wanted to sell it outside of Speyer at a higher price. Also, the city banned the import and sale of wine by the clergy with the intention to undercut the price of wine within the city and make a profit. The citizens refused payment of the “small tenth” to the church and construction of the 2 towers by the cathedral was continued. Thereupon the clergy left town and the bishop, in vain, declared an interdict. He also dismissed the episcopal office-holders and dissolved the judicial courts. The offices were taken up by citizens. But a compromise found in the context of the arbitration could not solve the old conflicts. For the time being, wine serving and jurisdiction were left aside. Therefore, the city decided in 1287 that council members could not have certain offices at the same time: chamberlain, Schultheiß, Vogt, mint master and tax collector. This effectively excluded the holders of the most important episcopal offices from the city council.

Rudolf I died on July 15, 1291, in Speyer and was entombed in the cathedral. The sculpture on his tomb slab is a true-to-life depiction of the king created only shortly after his death and is considered an outstanding artistic accomplishment of that era.

== Speyer receives the status of free imperial city ==
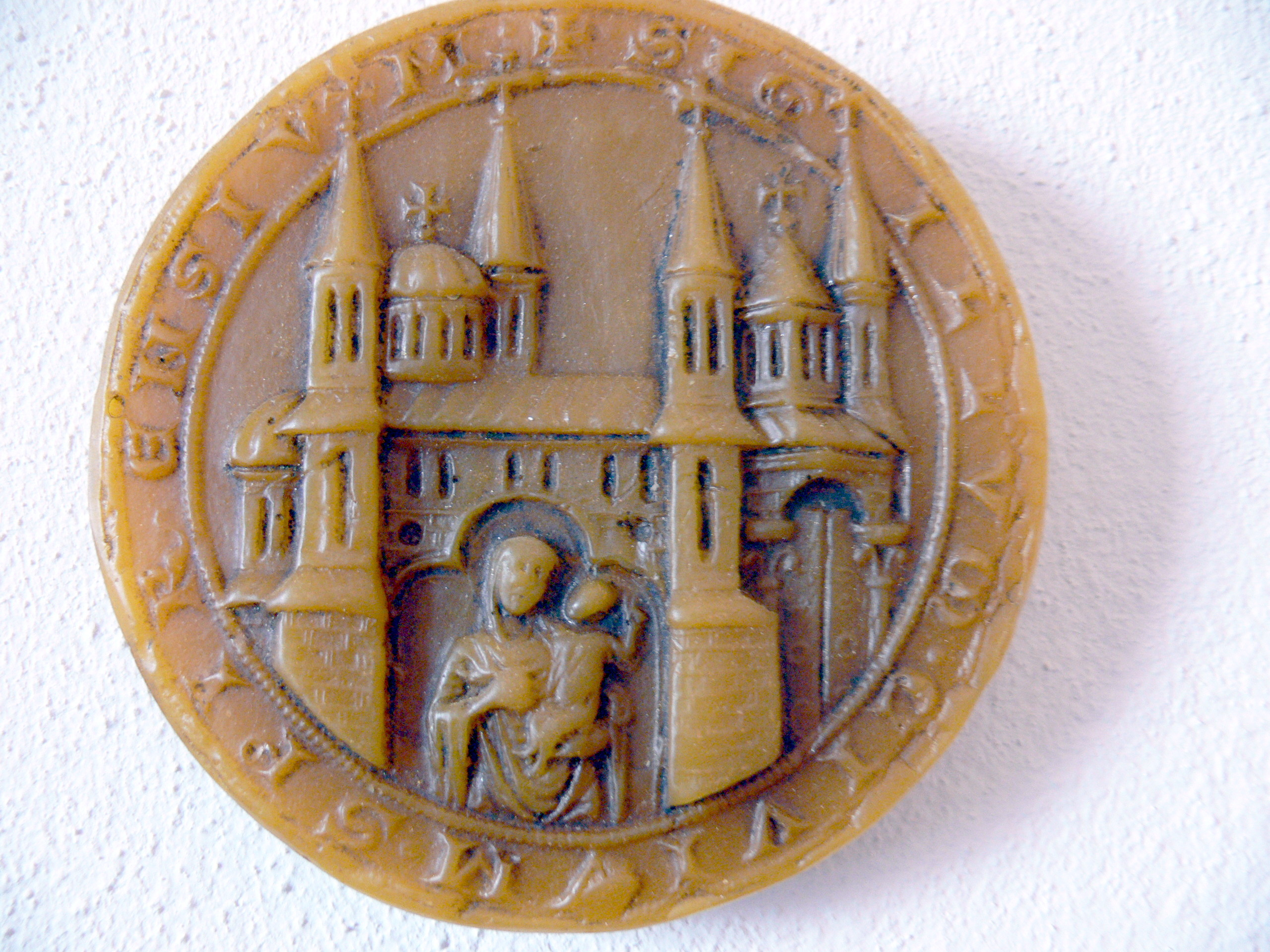
City seal of Speyer 1293

In 1293, the cities of Speyer, Worms and Mainz formed an “eternal” alliance to assert their rights against the bishops and the king. In September 1294, the council of Speyer submitted a solemn protest concerning the bishop's overbearing actions. It was read out in all churches of the city. On October 31 that same year, Bishop Frederick of Bolanden and the city signed a contract in which basically all the longstanding demands of Speyer were met and which codified the termination of episcopal power in the city. The citizens and their property were released from church dues and taxes, from accommodation duties (herbergas), from “Bannwein” (obligation to buy wine only from the church), from war tax, from alms-giving to the church, from precaria and from other services. The bishop would staff law courts and offices at the recommendation of the city council. He could arrest neither clerics nor laymen without proof of guilt. An arrangement for the sale of wine was yet to be found. The contract also contained a passage, that the banishment of the insurgents in 1265 was unjust and that the heirs would be allowed back into the city. This contract ended the domination of the city by the bishops and Speyer became a free imperial city. Yet the conflict with the endowments about the privileges was far from settled.

In connection with the century-long conflict between city and church there is one of the earliest records of Carnival in Germany. In his 1612 chronicle of Speyer, Christoph Lehmann mentions a report in old files: „Im Jahr 1296 hat man Unwesen der Fastnacht etwas zeitig angefangen / darinn etliche Burger in einer Schlegerey mit der Clerisey Gesind das ärgst davon getragen / hernach die Sach beschwerlich dem Rhat angebracht / und umb der Frevler Bestrafung gebetten.“ (In 1296, the mischief of carnival was started somewhat early / in it a number of citizens sustained bad injuries in a brawl with the servants of the bishop and the cathedral chapter / after which a complaint was brought before the council / requesting the punishment of the evildoers). The clergy accused a number of council members of various violent acts, e. g. forceful entry into the courts of cathedral clergy and into the area of immunity around the cathedral and attacks on the servants of the church. Apparently, these assaults were reason for the cathedral chapter to file suits against the council and the citizens and to threaten with excommunications. Because of the determined reaction of the city, the matter fizzled out. Yet, it is telling that in this time of great religiousness, people were not sufficiently deterred by such threats of the church as not to partake in such carnival mischief.

On February 2, 1298, Bishop Frederick agreed not to impose any excommunication, inhibition or interdict before the accused was duly cited and found guilty. Thus, the resentment of the endowments was directed at the bishop and they continued to oppose the loss of their privileges. It was only in 1300 that the archbishop of Mainz worked out a mediation. In the meantime, King Adolf granted Speyer additional privileges. In a document of 1297 he put the citizens of Speyer and Worms directly under his protection. In return, the 2 cities promised the king their support. The citizenry was granted the right only to be tried in their own town. In addition, ownership of the diverted Speyerbach was returned to Speyer. In 1298, Speyer was adjudged the proceeds of the Jews in the city. On July 2, 1298, a contingent from Speyer participated in the Battle of Göllheim on the side of King Adolf against anti-king Albert. King Adolf was killed. Speyer soon allied itself with King Albert against the Rhenish electors and in 1299 he confirmed the privileges of the city which became his favoured place of residence. In 1301, Albert officially granted Speyer the right to levy the sales tax.

In spite of the mediation efforts by the archbishop of Mainz, the quarrels continued. Sigibodo of Lichtenberg, a follower of King Albert, succeeded Bishop Frederick as bishop of Speyer. King Albert had to promise to the Speyer clergy (capitulatio caesarea) that he would rescind the concessions made to the city. Also, a squad of 60 mounted soldiers was assembled to fight against the Speyer citizenry. Speyer denied the bishop homage as well as entry into the city and banned the sale of wine by clerics and the payment of interest to the church. In the following 7 months, warlike operations laid waste to the countryside in the vicinity of Speyer and the courts of the church. On October 4, 1302, the warring parties signed a treaty in which all the demands of the citizenry were met. Even the ban against selling wine to the clergy remained in force. The power of the bishops was confined to the area of immunity around the cathedral resulting in two distinct political entities within Speyer's city walls.

== Hausgenossen (minters' cooperative) and guilds ==
The controversy in Speyer between citizenry and clergy ("generalis discordia") played only a minor role in the 14th century. In the contest for the throne between the House of Wittelsbach and the House of Habsburg, Speyer again stood in the centre of imperial policies. Against this background, a power struggle in the city council ensued between the minters' cooperative and the guilds.

In the beginning, the development of an urban establishment was a by-product of the bishop's rule of the city. The aristocratic and common servants as well as the experienced and rich citizens evolved into an administrative ruling class which was of decisive importance in the development of the cities. The minters' coop had a long-time monopoly for monetary transactions, making them very influential with established close links to the monarchy. From 1270 on, the ruling class merged with the merchants, the local nobility of the area and mainly the minters coop into a new establishment with hitherto unknown economical power.

The beginnings of the guilds in Speyer are not documented. When they were first mentioned in the beginning of the 14th century, they were already highly organized. Cloth manufacturing in Speyer was pivotal. For that purpose the area of Speyer had turned into a centre for growing dyer's madder. The guild citizenry made up the largest portion of Speyer's population. Professions organised into guilds were bakers/millers, fishermen, gardeners, tillers, and butchers; these make up about one third of all entries in historic documents. Another fifth each refers to textile manufacturing and services (trade, serving wine, transportation, and markets). Then there was fur and leather processing and trade, building trade, metal working and, not least, city employees and supervision staff. Some trades were located predominantly or only in a certain area of Speyer. The tanners were in the western part of the suburb of Hasenpfuhl, the boatmen (Hasenpfühler) around the harbour area along the Speyerbach, the gardeners in the Gilgen-suburb, the fishermen in the Fisher-suburb. The guild houses of the chandlers, shoemakers and blacksmiths settled south of the big market street, the bakers, butchers, tailors, wine sellers, weavers and masons on the northern side.

As a result of increasing pressure by the guilds, in 1304 it was agreed to compose the council with 11 members of the minters' coop and 13 of the guilds and that each group would furnish a mayor. Yet, by 1313, through skilled manoeuvering the minters' coop managed to hold all the council seats in their hands.

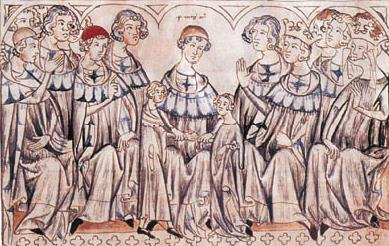
Wedding of John of Luxembourg and Elisabeth of Bohemia in Speyer 1310

During a diet in 1309, Henry VII had the remains of Adolf of Nassau and Albert I, opponents in the battle of Göllheim (1298) transferred to Speyer and entombed next to each other in the cathedral. These were the last two kings to be buried in Speyer. In the following year, on September 1, 1310, Henry VII had his son of 14 years, John married to Elisabeth of Bohemia in the cathedral.

On March 20, 1327, 13 guilds of Speyer joined into a confederation for mutual aid and enforced new council rules. There would be 16 guild members and 15 members of the minters' coop, successfully ending the sole reign of the latter. From that day on, documents were certified by the 2 mayors alone, not by the whole council. On the night of 22/23 October (Severin's Day) 1330, the coop members attempted to undo the new rules occupying the city, hoping for the approval of Louis IV. The revolt of Severin's Day was thwarted and the instigators were banished from Speyer. In December 1330, the cities of Mainz, Straßburg, Worms, Frankfurt and Oppenheim brokered a contract of atonement which stated that the council of Speyer would have 28 members evenly filled by coop members and guilds.

The minters lost their last privilege in 1349 when a pure guild constitution for Speyer was accepted. From then on, the coop members had to organise themselves along the lines of the guilds which made them one group among 14 others.

Speyer took up fifth place among the imperial cities on the Rhenish Bench and it had a seat and one vote in the Upper Rhenish Circle. In 1346 and 1381 Speyer hosted the association of imperial cities.

== Independence in peril ==
The agreement on the balanced council did not end political conflicts in Speyer. The second half of the 14th century started with the destruction and expulsion of the Jewish community, epidemics and Flagellant campaigns. The following decades were characterised by the power struggle between various factions of influential Speyer families. The city was under heavy financial burdens because of various payments it had to make for its alliances. The bishop and disempowered minters played upon the people's dissatisfaction. The citizens were outraged at the power games of Rudolf of Offenburg, councillor in 1352 and one of the mayors in 1358. He was banished from town for disturbing the peace, slander and forming malicious power groups and found exile with Margrave Rudolf IV of Baden. His opponents, the Frispecher family, filled in the influential vacancies, facilitated by the council election rules of 1375. This, in turn, led to an open revolt against the city council headed by the minter Henry of Landau. Together with 13 citizens he sacked the council and asked Rudolf of Offenburg back into the city. Yet, the revolt failed as they couldn't secure the formal approval by the citizenry. Everybody was in arms and a fight was only avoided after arbitration by city councillors from Mainz and Worms. Heinrich of Landau and Rudolf of Offenburg both fled; some followers were apprehended and executed. Heinrich of Landau found refuge with Speyer Bishop Adolf of Nassau who had been in a feud with the city since 1372. Their attempt to lay siege to Speyer in 1376 failed. Henry's contacts in Speyer were discovered and executed. Count Palatine Ruprecht the elder had to broker a contract of atonement between the city and the bishop.

In 1386, a conspiracy within the city council was uncovered. Background was the rivalry between the families of the Frispechers and the Fritzes. After this coup was thwarted the power of the council somewhat stabilized but it was increasingly engrossed by the oligarchy of the guilds.

The controversy between city, bishop and clergy continued to smolder in the background. To the displeasure of the council and the citizenry, the clergy still enjoyed many privileges such as wine serving, jurisdiction and the accumulated property of the “dead hand” (property transferred to the church and thus not subject to taxation). Because of this the city suffered from the considerable loss of revenues. Therefore, in 1323, it prohibited citizens to buy wine from the clergy outside allocated times. In 1345, this ban was expanded. In 1343, members of the cloth were excluded from citizen's rights which was meant to impede the function of the clerical court. At least some of the clergy then applied for citizen's rights.

In the second half of the 14th century it also became apparent, that the Speyer bishops would never give up their claim to lordship over the city. While the bishop managed to get the support of Charles IV and particularly of the Count Palatine, the city could not anymore count on the unlimited backing of the emperor. Speyer lost Karl's benevolence after, as most imperial cities, it had sided with Louis IV against the House of Luxembourg. In addition, Speyer had opposed a candidate favoured by Karl, Lamprecht of Brunn, who became bishop of Speyer in 1336. Lamprecht, in turn, got Karl to confirm the contract detrimental to Speyer arranged by King Rudolf in 1284. This enabled the bishop to challenge contracts of 1294 and 1302 which again were detrimental to the church. Karl went even one step further: on April 20, 1366, in the “Magna Carta of the bishopric” he confirmed all the rights and properties of the church in Speyer, ignoring all existing conditions, and he demanded that Speyer accept the bishops spiritual and secular authority. Yet, the city also managed to take advantage of conflicts between emperor and bishop. When Bishop Adolf of Nassau who unsuccessfully laid siege to Speyer in 1376 got into a political argument with Karl IV in 1378, the emperor confirmed the city's taxation rights and the right to change the wine units.

The quarrels between Speyer and the bishops were to become more vicious yet. Bishop Nicolaus of Wiesbaden, inaugurated in 1381, in league with the powerful Count Palatine, was very uncompliant, yet he was followed by an even more unyielding bishop, Raban of Helmstatt in 1399, who almost made Speyer lose its independence. Raban was a close confidant and chancellor of King Rupert III. During his tenure of 30 years, Raban managed to trim back the privileges of the city piecemeal, a fate that also struck the city of Worms where another follower of Rupert, Matthew of Kraków, became bishop and many other imperial cities. In 1401, Raban received an extensive confirmation of episcopal privileges which simultaneously abrogated all conflicting rights. With the king's support, Raban subjected Speyer to reprisals by blocking grain imports in order to force the retraction of city laws against the clergy. In turn, the citizenry refused payment of the tithe whereupon the cathedral chapter excommunicated Mayor Fritze. In the following years, city and clergy heaped lawsuits upon lawsuits on each other.

In 1411, the city obtained a set of protection and confirmation certificates from antipope John XXIII. Another proven leverage of the church against Speyer was for the city clergy to leave town. In 1414, Speyer managed to convince King Sigismund to confirm privileges which Raban again managed to undermine with another affirmation of church rights the very same year. An attempt to arbitrate the conflict before the king at the Council of Constance totally failed. The fights intensified when Speyer's former mayor, Conrad Roseler, in a battle of words, gave Raban a piece of his mind: “The king is our lord/Not you/You have no jurisdiction over us/We owe you no obedience/.............” (Der Koenig ist unser Herr/Ihr nicht/habt auch kein Gebott über uns/wir sind euch Gehorsam nit schuldig/So hant wir gegen euch als Obrigkeit nichts/ und nur wider unseren Gegentheil gehandelt). In 1418, the clergy again moved out of the city.

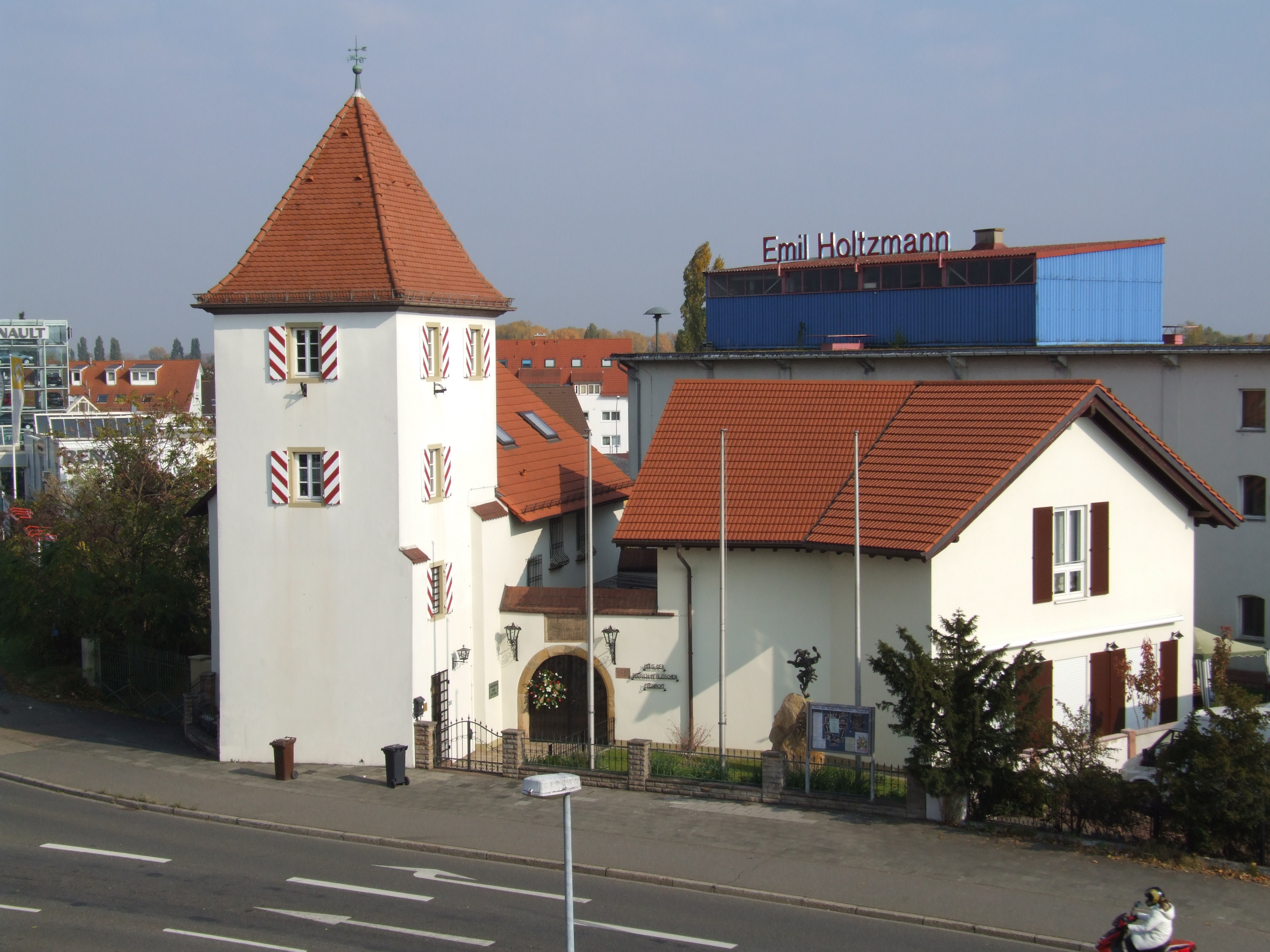
Watchtower on the road to Worms (Wormser Warte) in Speyer

It dawned on the council that negotiations, lawsuits and arbitrations wouldn't get them anywhere. As of 1419, Speyer sought military assistance which it found in count Stephan of Zweibrücken, an opponent of Bishop Raban. Already in 1410 the city had begun construction of a defensive dike around the city territory outside the walls. It consisted of a ridge with a hedge and a moat with watchtowers made of wood or stone at intervals. Speyer also set up a squad of mercenaries as core of the city defence force. These measures had actually become necessary because of increased feuding in which Speyer more often became involved. With the support of Count Stephan, in 1419, the citizens of Speyer demolished the bishop's Marientraut castle, which was under construction at the Speyerbach in Hanhofen. They used the stones to fortify their own city walls. A long process of lawsuits and arbitrations ensued in which Raban questioned the independence of Speyer and demanded 450,000 guilders compensation. The arbitral Elector Palatine Louis III on October 3, 1419, was basically all in favour of the bishop and devastating for Speyer. He not only awarded the clergy the right to taxation in the city, to import grain and serve wine, to fill posts of courts and offices but also confirmed the bishop's secular lordship.

Raban succeeded in thwarting a petition for help by Speyer to Pope Martin V and having the appeal assigned to Archbishop Conrad III of Mainz. Conrad's verdict of May 27, 1420, essentially conformed to the arbitration by the Count Palatine and partially even went beyond. Eventually, in 1421, Raban managed to have the 1419 confirmation of privileges by Emperor Siegmund annulled.

Speyer's last resort was active resistance by the citizenry. The council ignored Conrad's verdict, declined further arbitrations and continued in its efforts to find political and military support. It signed alliance and aid treaties, e. g. with Count Emich VII of Leiningen and Bernhard I, Margrave of Baden. Hereupon, Raban pursued the conquest of Speyer, assembling an army with the help of Count Palatine Louis III, his brother, Count Palatine Otto I and the archbishops of Trier and Mainz. The siege began in June 1422 and Speyer's resistance dwindled after 2 months. Yet, Emperor Siegmund intervened and prevented the subjugation of the city. But Speyer was compelled to accept the 1420 verdict of Conrad, to pay 43,000 guilders compensation and to raise the pay of almost 60,000 guilders for the army. The city introduced an extraordinary tax and mustered the last installment in November 1426.

In letters of complaint to Emperor Siegmund, Speyer endeavoured to have the verdict abrogated or at least attenuated. It closely explained the activities around the bishop and the disadvantages they entailed for the empire. Eventually, Siegmund did scrap the verdict and fully restored the rights of the city, but the document was never issued. Raban, together with the archbishop of Mainz, again managed to foil a positive judgment for Speyer. The city at least received a formal confirmation of its privileges and customary law but Conrad's verdict nevertheless remained in place for all newly upcoming disagreements and couldn't be altered without the clergy's consent. For Speyer this constituted in considerable financial losses, constraints in its previous rights and thus in a setback in its urban development. The loss of its imperial freedoms was staved off only narrowly. The legal distinction between citizens of the city and its ecclesiastic inhabitants remained. Bishop Raban's struggle for dominion in the city failed and Speyer slowly recovered from this crisis.

In 1434, Speyer signed a 10-year-protection treaty with Elector Palatine Louis III. As of 1439, the region was threatened by marauding Armagnacs from France. The cities of Speyer, Strassburg, Worms and Mainz aligned to put up a force of 100 armed horsemen (30 from Mainz and Strassburg, 20 from Speyer and Worms). Possibly because of this danger, the church and city moved closer together. The bishop also contributed to the defense of the city and hired a gunsmith who could also make gunpowder and train soldiers. On April 25, 1440, even a friendship treaty was signed. In 1441, the council of imperial cities met in Speyer to deliberate the threat, in 1443 the city walls and the perimeter defensive dike were strengthened and another protection treaty was signed with the new Elector Palatine Louis IV. Affairs with the emperor improved and Frederick III came to town in July 1442. In 1444 he called on Speyer to send deputies to the imperial diet in Nuremberg where the danger of the Armagnacs was to be deliberated. On November 1 that same year another diet with the same topic took place in Speyer, but the Armagnacs retreated to Lorraine.

In these years Speyer was time and again entangled in military conflicts or feuds, either because of its own direct involvement or because it had to support allies. It was drawn into a greater conflict in 1455 when a war broke out between Electorate of the Palatinate and Palatinate-Zweibrücken. Speyer contributed 50 marksmen to the side of the Palatinate.

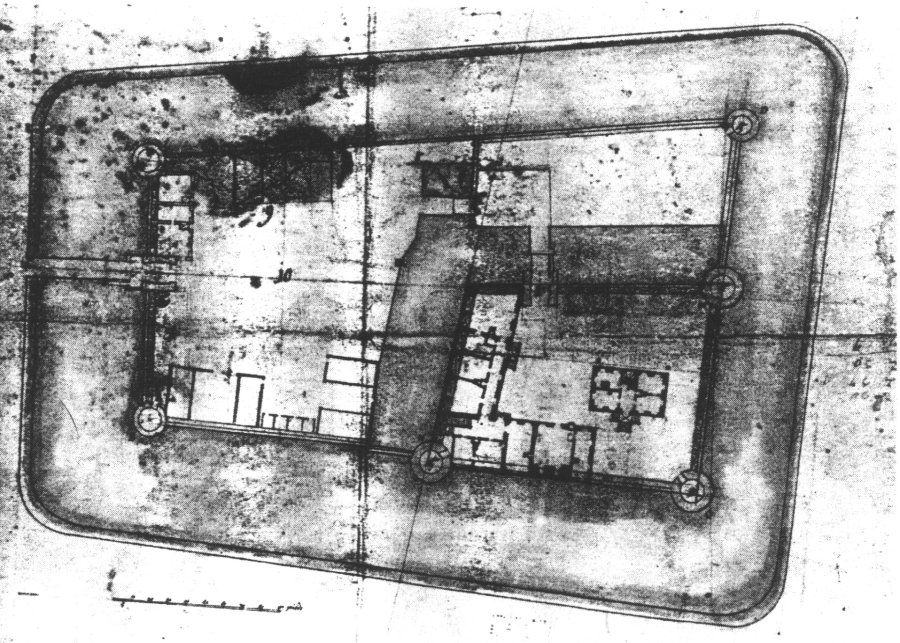
Marientraut Castle, Hanhofen (layout plan of 1720)

From 1459 to 1462, Speyer again had to side with the Palatinate in the “Palatinate War” and the “Mainz Collegiate Feud” against Electorate of Mainz. Allies of the Palatinate were also the bishop of Speyer, the Landgrave of Hesse and the cities of Weissenburg, Strassburg, Heilbronn and Wimpfen. Speyer contributed 200 marksmen which were sent on short notice to Mannheim. Shortly after, it supplied the Palatinate army with 30 armed men, 60 marksmen and 10 armed horsemen. Many villages and towns in the region were devastated. Speyer participated July 4–7, 1460, in the battle of Pfeddersheim with 60 marksmen and one army wagon. On August 24 it participated with 50 marksmen in the escalade of the Leiningen castle in Hassloch; a year later the castle was totally razed. Allies of Mainz, Veldenz and Leiningen, were decisively beaten in the battle of Meisenheim in June 1461. But matters hadn't been settled, yet. There were 2 parties in a struggle for the archbishop's seat in Mainz. Speyer was in the uncomfortable position that its bishop sided with the pope and the emperor against the Palatinate and Hesse, the latter two banned and excommunicated. The city was fiercely courted by both parties but it managed to keep itself out of the conflict even though the citizens supported the Count Palatine Frederick I and there were violent clashes with the bishop. After the Battle of Seckenheim, victorious for Frederick, the city reconciled with the count and the bishop. But for Speyer it was very disquieting that the new archbishop of Mainz took possession of the city of Mainz on October 28, 1462, and the city lost its independence as a free imperial city.

The new bishop of Speyer, Mathew of Rammung, took over in 1464. He also strove to expand or regain the authority of the church. In the process Speyer, through no fault of its own, came into a conflict with the church. In 1465, at the behest of the imperial judicial court, it was to restore a citizen to his right against the bishop. In the bargain, in the escalating dispute the Count Palatine sided against Speyer. He even considered capturing the city. It was only on December 21 that the emperor intervened and a contract ended the dispute. Relations between the city and the bishop improved and in 1467 even a friendship treaty was signed. This did not end tensions with the clerics and Speyer grudgingly had to accept the completion of Marientraut castle in Hanhofen.

In 1470/71, Speyer again struggled to remain neutral, this time in a dispute between the Count Palatine and the emperor. The count had taken possession of the Abbey and the town of Weissenburg. Both emperor and count demanded military support of Speyer.

== A prosperous city ==
After the political setbacks in the first half of the 15th century, Speyer recovered in the later second half. The lists of 1514 contained 8 whole and 8 half guilds. The whole guilds were:

1. minters' coop or minters
2. chandlers incl. chemists, glaziers, bagmakers, wet white tanners
3. weavers incl. blue and black dyers
4. clothmakers incl. hatmakers
5. tailors
6. blacksmiths incl. goldsmiths, locksmiths, barber surgeons, knife makers, farriers, armourers
7. butchers
8. gardeners

Half-guilds were:

1. Salzgässer incl. dealers, rope makers, oil vendors
2. Hasenpfühler, incl. sailors, ship builders, carters
3. furriers
4. carpenters incl. joiners, wainwrights, turners, potters, masons, stonecutters
5. bakers
6. fishermen
7. cobblers
8. tanners

The number of guilds in Speyer changed over time. The given order reflects on their importance which was also subject to change. The minters provided the patricians of the city because of their importance for economy and politics resulting from their predominant role as wholesale merchants and moneylenders. Speyer resumed a remarkably strong role in the money market of southwestern Germany.

The main pillar of the economy was production of and trade in cloth on which about 15% of the population depended. Including the supporting trades, such as spinning, dyeing, churning etc., the share was even higher. The Speyer cloth trade extended as far as the North Sea, the Baltic, Silesia, Transylvania and Switzerland. Speyer was also a major trading centre for wine. Wine from the Palatine and Rhenish Hesse was shipped all over, usually by boat on the Rhine. By the end of the century, two renowned printers opened shop in Speyer, Peter Drach and Konrad Hist.

In 1486, the Dominican Heinrich Kramer published his book Malleus Maleficarum, a treatise on the prosecution of witches, in Speyer. Although soon condemned by the Catholic Church it was later used by royal courts and contributed to the increasingly brutal prosecution of witchcraft.

Speyer played a prominent role in the city politics of the empire. From the middle of the 15th century on, the emperors usually asked the imperial cities to participate in the diets. As of 1489 they regularly took part, even though they were long from being considered equal to the other territories. In the end of the 15th century, the registry of the Rhenish League of Cities was set up in Speyer.

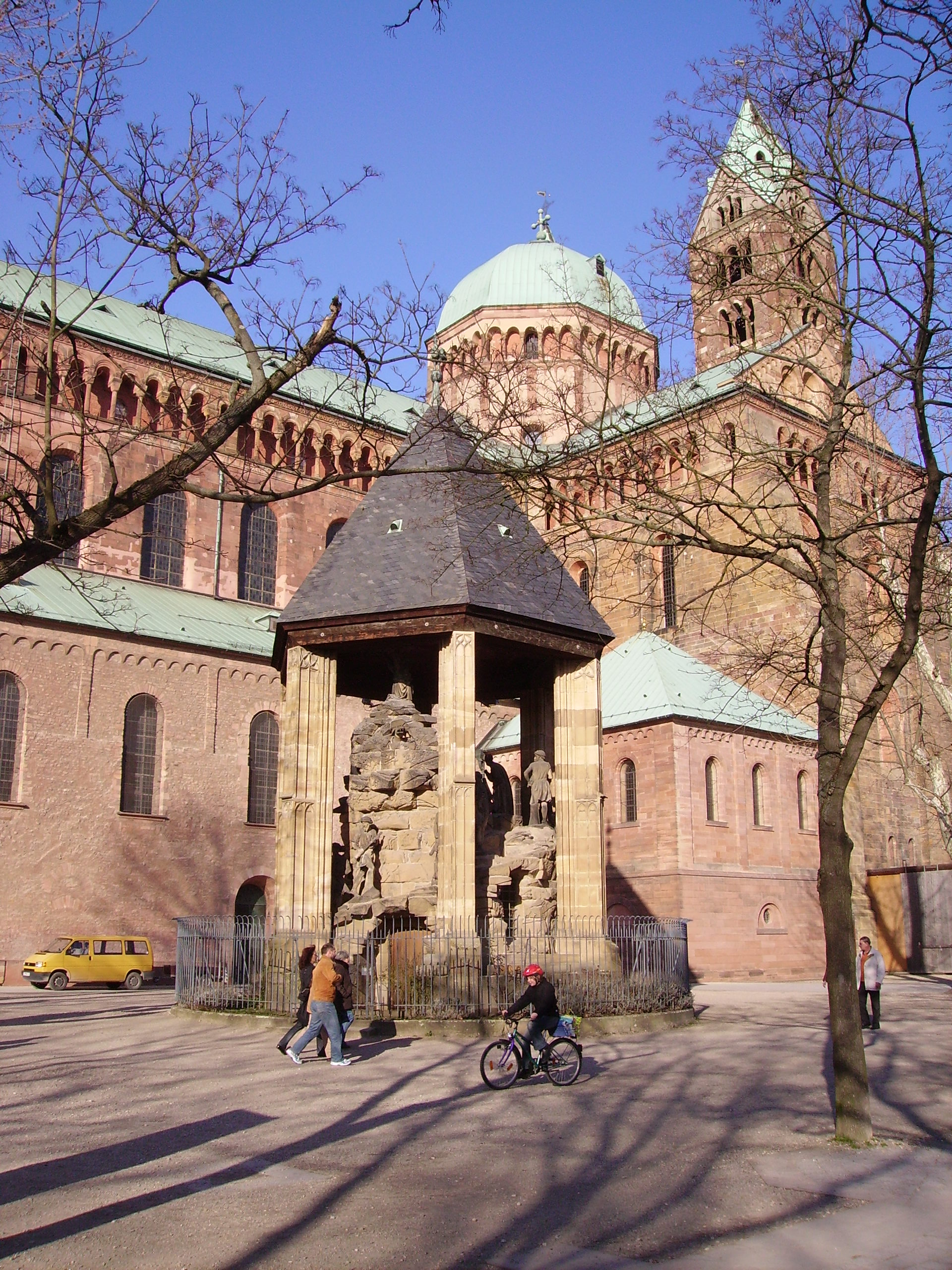
Mount of Olives, partially restored in the 19th century

Speyer was requested to participate in the diet of 1471 in Regensburg where military aid against the Turks was discussed, who had captured Constantinople. In several following meetings of the Rhenish cities association, one of them on August 1, 1473, in Speyer, the cities argued against the war tax levied by the emperor but he prevailed in his demand, that the cities contributed 1,396 men to an imperial army of 10,000. For Speyer, this translated into 22 men, 6 on horse and 16 on foot. These kinds of contributions are an indication of the rank of a city at that time: Worms had to supply 15 men, Weissenburg 9, Nuremberg 42, Frankfurt 45, Strassburg and Cologne each 60. On occasion of the diet of 1474 in Augsburg, there was another assembly of the cities in Speyer on November 30, 1474, to discuss further support against the Turks. Again, the cities were indignant but they approved aid for a war against Duke Charles of Burgundy who had attacked the bishopric of Cologne. Speyer supplied 200 men of which 10 did not return after 6 months. In Frankfurt in 1486, it was decided that the cities support the cause against the Turks with 527,900 guilders. Speyer paid 4,000, Weissenburg 800, Worms 2,000, Heilbronn 2,000, Wimpfen 300, Frankfurt 10,000, Strassburg and Nuremberg each 12,000. In 1487, in Nuremberg, again payments were required: 1,500 from Speyer, 300 from Weissenburg, 600 from Worms, 2,000 from Frankfurt and 3,000 from Strassburg. 1489 saw another demand for manpower to supply an army of 29,487 men against France and Hungary. Speyer sent 85, Worms 58, Weißenburg 17, Strassburg 137 and Frankfurt 167. In 1488, Speyer again supplied 74 mercenaries for a campaign of the emperor against Flanders in order to liberate heir apparent Maximilian from captivity.

Maximilian I acceded to the throne in 1493 and visited Speyer only a few months later until July 1494. In his company were not only his wife but also Albert III, Duke of Saxony, the legate of Naples and allegedly King Richard III of England.

In 1509, a life-size sculpture of the Mount of Olives by Hans Seyffer was completed in the centre of the cloister on the south side of the cathedral. From 1512 to 1514, the western main gate (Altpörtel) was elevated to the height it has today (without the roof), making it one of Germany's highest town gates. The rounded late-Gothic arcades were already influenced by the Renaissance.

== Citizens’ revolt of 1512/13 ==
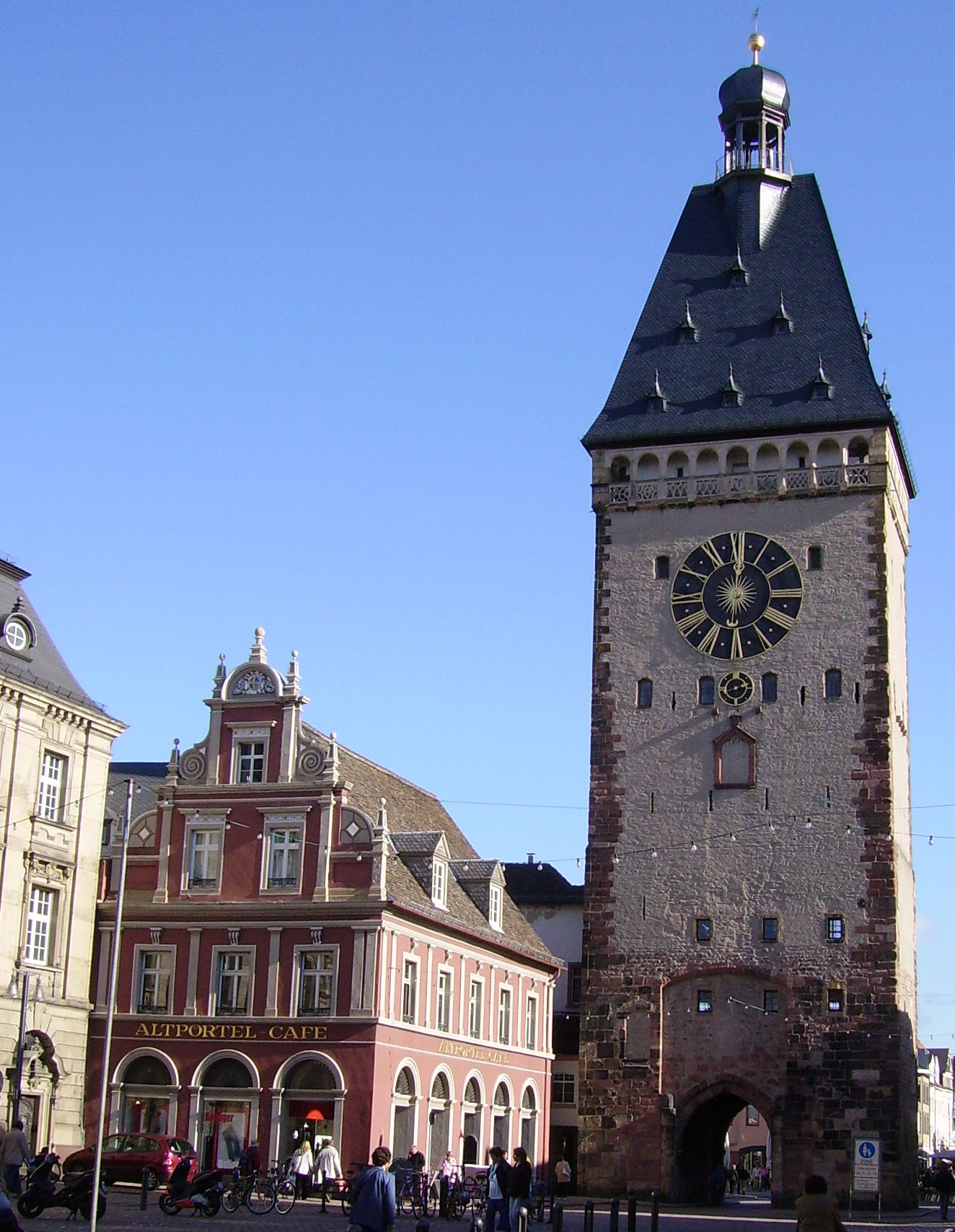
Altpörtel, western side. The lower part was built between 1230 and 1250, the top floor with the gallery from 1512 to 1514. The roof was added in 1708.

Speyer's continuous obligations to the empire were a heavy burden on its citizens. The tax system was especially disadvantageous for smaller assets. Increasing taxation lead to resentment also because of the tax exemptions for the clergy.

In 1512/13 this resulted in a revolt by the citizens supported by the guilds against the city council. Similar revolts broke out in at least 19 other cities between 1509 and 1514. In Speyer it was triggered by a rumour in one of the guilds that the council conspired to deceive the citizenry in order to achieve more revenues. An old letter of 1375 was found pertaining to the diminution of the wine unit. The heated atmosphere lead to arrests in June 1512 and to assemblies which were soon joined by all the guilds. A major demand was that the council present all bills of the city. The whole citizenry appeared in arms, the court of the city hall was occupied and 2 prisoners were freed. Some of the councillors sought refuge in the cathedral. On June 28, 1512, the insurrectionists selected a committee for all the guilds to take up talks with the council. The council bowed to the committee and issued a guaranty certificate transferring the unimpeded right to negotiate thereby rendering itself incapable of action. Some councillors were banished from the city and Mayor Jakob Meurer moved to the bishop in Udenheim. The emperor sent arbitrators to Speyer and succeeded in having the bills of several years presented before witnesses from other cities. Wine units and wine tax were also a bone of contention. The committee wanted the wine sold by the clergy subject to taxation. It also wanted higher tax rates for the rich. The council refused, fearing that the rich would then leave town, but made minor allowances. Again, the emperor sent arbitrators.

The true reasons for the revolt more and more came to the fore. The city had suffered losses of around 100,000 guilders because the council passively acquiesced to the 1420 verdict of Conrad. Within 30 years, the clergy in Speyer had accumulated additional assets to the value of 60,000 guilders. Among other things, the committee accused the council of evasion, embezzlement and mismanagement as well as the expensive feud with Herr von Heydeck. It summed up its complaints in 39 items to be decided upon by the emperor. Council offices, e. g., were to each be filled with 2 persons from the council and the community. The previous larger wine unit was to be reintroduced, tax on wine and flour was to be halved for one year and the rich were to pay double tax either for wine or for property. The council rejected all accusations referring to the community's duty of good faith and duty to obey. The arbitrations were in vain. Tensions in the city remained high but there was no more violence. On September 30, the emperor's decision on the 39 items of the complaint was passed to the citizenry; the major demands were refused. There were noticeable changes in the city constitution but the attempt to change the oligarchic regime failed. The differences in the city remained under the surface and the committee stayed in place. A revolt by the weavers on December 21, 1512, was unable to change anything. At the request of the council, on April 8, 1513, the guilds expressed their confidence.

In the meantime, the council continued its efforts to moderate the 1420 verdict of Conrad. Negotiations wore on through 1513. On December 19, 1514, after several attempts, a settlement was found in which some concessions to the city were made.

== Peasants’ and citizens’ revolt 1525 ==
In 1525 the Rhine region was gripped by a peasants' revolt (part of the German Peasants' War) that hit the bishopric of Speyer on April 20. The revolt was mainly directed against church possessions and the peasants turned against tithe, interest and lease payments. On April 30, they planned to move against Speyer in order to “destroy the nests of the clergy which, for many years have been nourished at the disadvantage and great damage of the poor”. The influence of Lutheran teachings on the revolt is visible. The peasants had in mind to lay siege to the city and to force the clerics within to accept the Reformation. They expected the support of the citizens which were to remain unmolested.

The peasants' discontent had also spread to the citizens. In assemblies they demanded the verdict of Conrad to be abolished. At their insistence the council presented 8 demands to the four endowments of the city. Should they not be accepted, the endowments would be attacked and the cathedral destroyed. In the face of these threats, the clerics accepted the 8 demands on April 25 and on April 28 they swore the oath of the citizens ceding all previous special rights. The clergy submitted to the general taxes and duties and even adopted a share of the defense expenses of the city. However, the council wanted to prevent the citizens from solidarity with the peasants. It took up negotiations with the peasants resulting in the treaty of Udenheim (where the bishop of Speyer resided) on May 5, 1525. The city made some concessions, it was spared and the peasants moved on.

On June 23/24, 1525, the peasants suffered a crushing defeat in the Battle of Pfeddersheim at the hands of Count Palatine Louis V. This had immediate effects on Speyer as the clergy directly set about to have the enforced commitments revoked. On July 8, Speyer had to declare the contract with the clergy null and void and again accept the 1514 verdict of Conrad. The only concession the clergy had to make was an annual payment of 200 guilders for the city's losses. With this the most serious attempt by Speyer to disempower the clergy had failed. But the city continued in its struggle for changes in its favour. On January 4, 1515, it managed to sign a new agreement with the clergy with some improvements for the city.

== Imperial Diets and Reformation ==
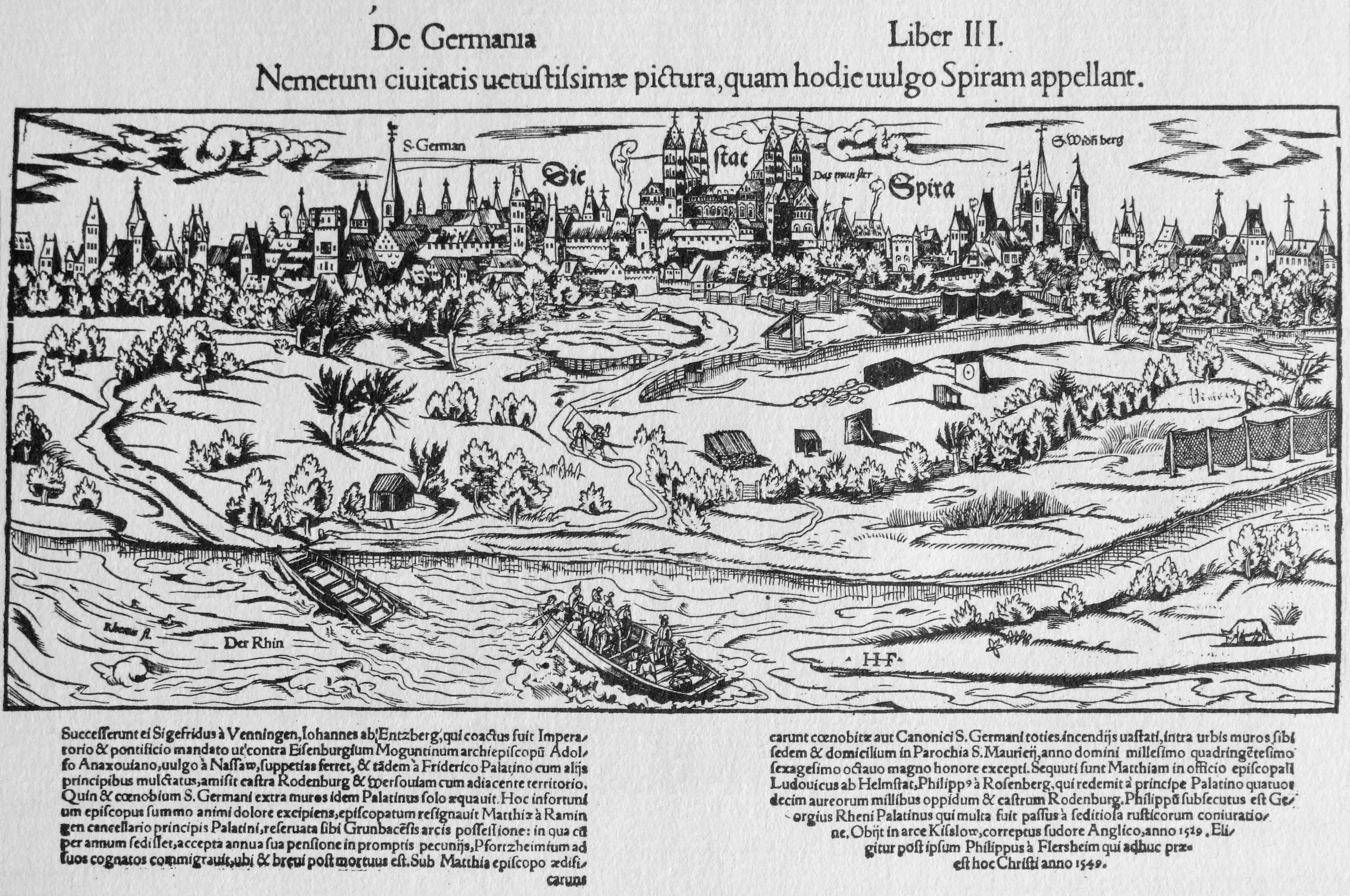
View of Speyer in the time of the diets. Xylography from Cosmographia universalis, Basel 1550, by Sebastian Münster

In the first half of the 16th century Speyer once again became the focus of German history. For one, this is expressed in the fact that of thirty Imperial Diets held in this century, five took place in Speyer. In addition, Speyer hosted imperial delegation diets, e. g. in 1558, 1560, 1583, 1595 and 1599/60, prince-elector diets, e. g. in 1588, and imperial moderation diets, e. g. in 1595.

Since Luther's posting of his 95 Theses and the Diet of Worms of 1521 creed, the Reformation and uprisings had become the dominating issues of domestic politics. The upcoming humanistic ideas in the years prior to this did not pass Speyer without traces. In the decades around the turn of the century, there was an association of humanistic minded clerics of which the bishops Rammung and Helmstatt had already been members. Helmstatt appointed Jakob Wimpfeling as cathedral preacher in Speyer. Wimpfeling's successor, Jodocus Gallus, also was a humanist. Both were members of the Rhenish Literati Society (Sodalitas litteraria Rhenania). Another member of the association was cathedral provost George of Gemmingen. The Speyer humanists were centred around the house of the provost Thomas Truchsess of Wetzhausen, a pupil of Johann Reuchlin. Another host was cathedral vicar Maternus Hatten who was in touch with renowned humanists of the empire. Erasmus of Rotterdam and Hermann von dem Busche associated with Hatten and met him in Speyer in 1518. Erasmus came to Speyer four times. Busch, in turn, was in touch with Martin Luther and Melanchthon. Hatten cultivated good relations with auxiliary Bishop Anton Engelbrecht, who held reformist views, which is why Bishop Georg disposed him and he had to flee to Strassburg in 1525. Hatten and Engelbrecht were instrumental when Martin Butzer had his monastic vows as a Dominican annulled in 1521. Butzer also was a guest of Hatten for a few months in 1520 on his flight to Strassburg from Heidelberg, where he was threatened by a heretics trial. At the instigation of Hatten, a priest came to Speyer in 1525 who preached Lutheranism. Thus, openly professing to Luther's teachings, the cathedral chapter took legal proceedings in 1527 and discharged him. Hatten also went to Strassburg. It is not clear whether this priest was the first one preaching Lutheranism in Speyer as there were other clerics during this time known for their Lutheran disposition: Werner of Goldberg who had to resign from his post in St. Martin (northern suburb of Speyer), Michael Diller, prior of the Augustine monastery and Anton Eberhard, prior of the Carmelite monastery.

Speyer print shops must have been involved in spreading Lutheran writings early on because in 1522, Pope Hadrian VI called on the city council to forbear print and distribution of such writings. At least as of 1522/23 it can be concluded that the council of Speyer was well disposed to Luther's teachings. At the imperial diets the city advocated for a general council (synod) and the cessation of abuse by the church. At the cities' associations in Speyer 1522 and Ulm 1524 it spoke out against the church obstructing Lutheran practices. At the Edict of Worms (1521), it was generally considered impractical to execute and the city council did not adhere to it. The atmosphere in Speyer must have been hostile enough that processions were not held in the usual manner anymore for fear of trouble or even ridicule as happened in 1524. The conclusion appears justified, that Lutheran ideas fell on fertile soil in most imperial cities such as Speyer not least because of their century old deep-rooted anticlerical sentiment. By 1525, Luther's teachings had gained a firm hold.

=== Diet of 1526 ===
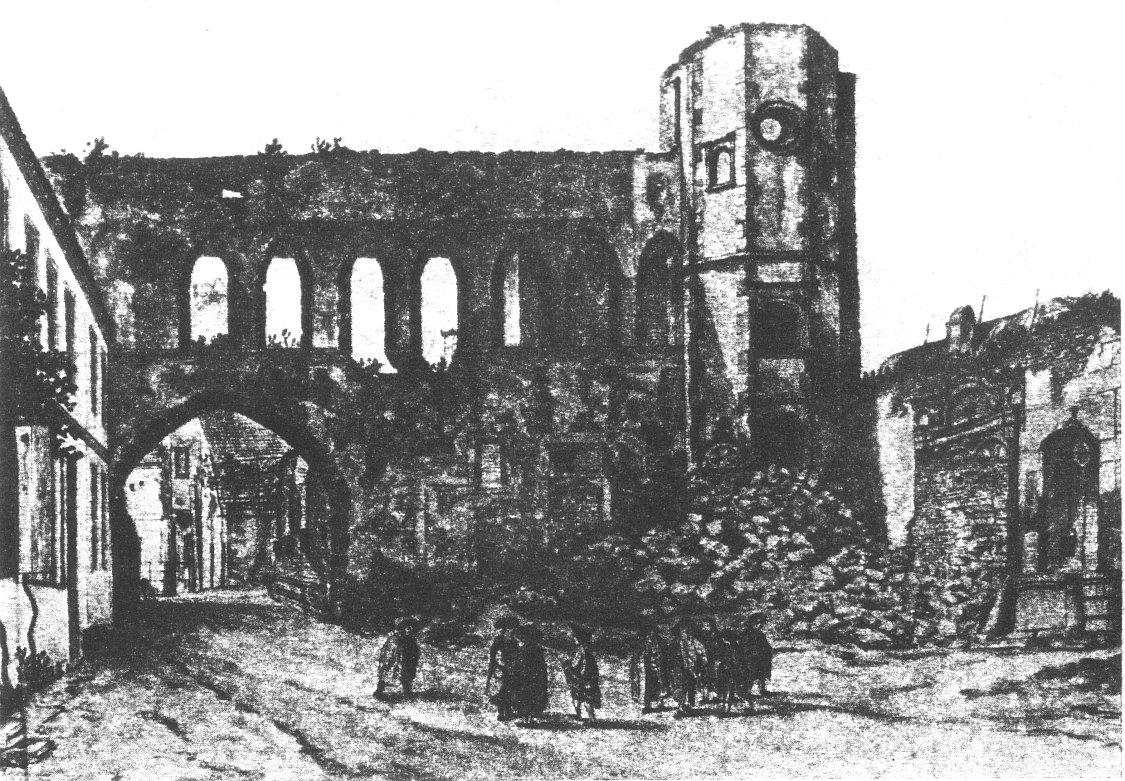
Ruins of the Ratshof in 1789, in which the Speyer diets took place; to the right the walled door to the audience room of the Imperial Chamber Court. Water colour by Franz Stöber

With pressing religious questions and uprisings as a background, the Imperial Diet of 1526 convened in Speyer. As always for the host town of a Diet, accommodation and provision for several thousand guests, the elector of Saxony alone travelling with 700 guests and 400 horses, were a challenge for the council, inhabitants and landlords. On the other hand, such events provided a town with considerable earnings.

In the previous diets, questions about faith had been amply discussed. In Speyer, Emperor Charles V was deputised by his brother Archduke Ferdinand. At the request of the emperor, official topics of the diet were religion and compliance with the Edict of Worms until a council, precautionary measures against further uprisings, defense measures against the Turks and sponsoring of the Imperial Regiment and the Imperial Chamber Court.

The diet began with a grand opening on June 25 with processions of princes and envoys to the cathedral and the ceremonious High Mass. There already was a small Lutheran group but rigid barriers had not yet formed and intercourse remained polite. No one had a schism in mind. The most distinctive Lutherans were John, Elector of Saxony and Philip I, Landgrave of Hesse. Their entourage included Johannes Agricola, George Spalatin and master Adam of Fulda who sermonised in Speyer during the meetings. The represented imperial cities also were mostly Lutheran. The most influential were Nuremberg and Strassburg but also Ulm, Frankfurt and Augsburg.

After two months of deliberation, the diet could not come to a clear decision and the pressing questions of religion remained unsolved. The emperor opposed attempts at a national church reform. Instead, there was a consequential compromise: The assembly requested the emperor to summon a general council or a national assembly within 1 ½ years. Until then, every imperial estate was to behave for itself and its country “in a manner that each can hope and trust to answer for before God and his imperial majesty”. But on this diet, the schism in matters of religion in Germany had become apparent. The ambiguous resolution that each estate basically should behave as it saw fit, favoured the expansion of Luther's doctrines.

The diet of 1526 did decide upon matters which happened to be of great importance for Speyer: the Imperial Regiment and the Imperial Chamber Court (Reichskammergericht), next to the emperor the highest ranking representatives of state power, were both moved to Speyer the following year. The emperor dissolved the regiment only a few years later in 1530 but the court was to remain in Speyer for 162 years until 1689. For the city, this had manifold economical and political implications. Apart from the high-ranking judges, many people involved with the court moved to Speyer: the court staff, the autonomous court chancellery with officers, subordinate officials and servants as well as free-lancers such as procurators and lawyers with their personnel.

=== Diet of 1529 ===
In March 1529, the Imperial Diet again met in Speyer (see Diet of Speyer 1529) where the emperor wanted to mobilise the Imperial estates against the Reformation. As in 1526, Ferdinand acted for his brother, Emperor Charles V and the topics of the diet remained the same. Charles had abrogated the 1526 resolution on faith demanding a new resolution more to his taste. The entourage of the Lutheran princes included familiar faces and new ones such as those of the reformers Philipp Melanchthon and Erhard Schnepf. Ferdinand was accompanied by Johann Faber who ardently preached in the cathedral against Luther, promulgating that Turks were better than Lutherans. The diet opened on March 15 and the meetings again took place in the Ratshof which had been expanded. The argument about religion, conscience and obedience divided the estates. Already on March 22, a committee of 18 members resolved to rescind the Speyer recess of 1526 and reconfirm the Edict of Worms. There were only three Lutheran representatives in the committee, John of Saxony, Jacob Sturm from Strassburg and Christoph Tetzel from Nuremberg to vote against it. In vain, on April 12, the Lutheran estates filed a complaint but the committee's resolution was also accepted in the main assembly.

The Lutheran princes and estates were not prepared to submit to this majority vote and on April 19/20 composed a letter of protest. They not only objected that the recess of 1526 could be annulled by majority vote but also argued that matters of religious faith could not be decided upon by majority vote at all. The diet refused to accept the appeal which then was forwarded to the emperor.

With this protestation by the Lutheran princes and cities against a resolution of the diet an incident of historical proportion emanated from Speyer: although firstly a legality, it sealed the schism of the Christian church and is considered the birth of Protestantism. From this time on the adherents of the Reformation movement were called Protestants.

On the very same day, the Electorate of Saxony, Hesse, Strassburg, Nuremberg and Ulm discussed a defensive alliance which should be joined by other reform-minded places. Yet, the alliance failed due to the disunity among the Protestants (Luther – Zwingli) and for fear of adding fuel to the religious problems.

A consequential resolution of this diet in Speyer, with the support of the Lutherans, was the mandate on Anabaptists. There had been laws against Anabaptism in various regions but now it was punishable by death in the whole empire.

In spite of the emperor's irritation, Diller and Eberhard were able to preach in Speyer unchallenged and tacitly supported by the city. More and more clerics abandoned their church and the new creed was preached in one church after the other. In 1540, the city council officially employed Diller and Eberhard as the “City of Speyer’s evangelical preachers”, thus definitely professing Lutheranism. In the aftermath, the citizens of Speyer completely converted; by 1675 there were only 42 Catholics left in town. This decision by the city was to continue to have an effect for a long time. In 1698, during the reconstruction following the War of Succession, only Protestants were allowed to settle in the city. Another decision taken in 1540 was the establishment of the Lutheran Council School (Ratsschule) as competition to the Catholic Cathedral school of the bishop.

Statues of outstanding representatives of the Reformation at the Speyer diets (Memorial Church Speyer)

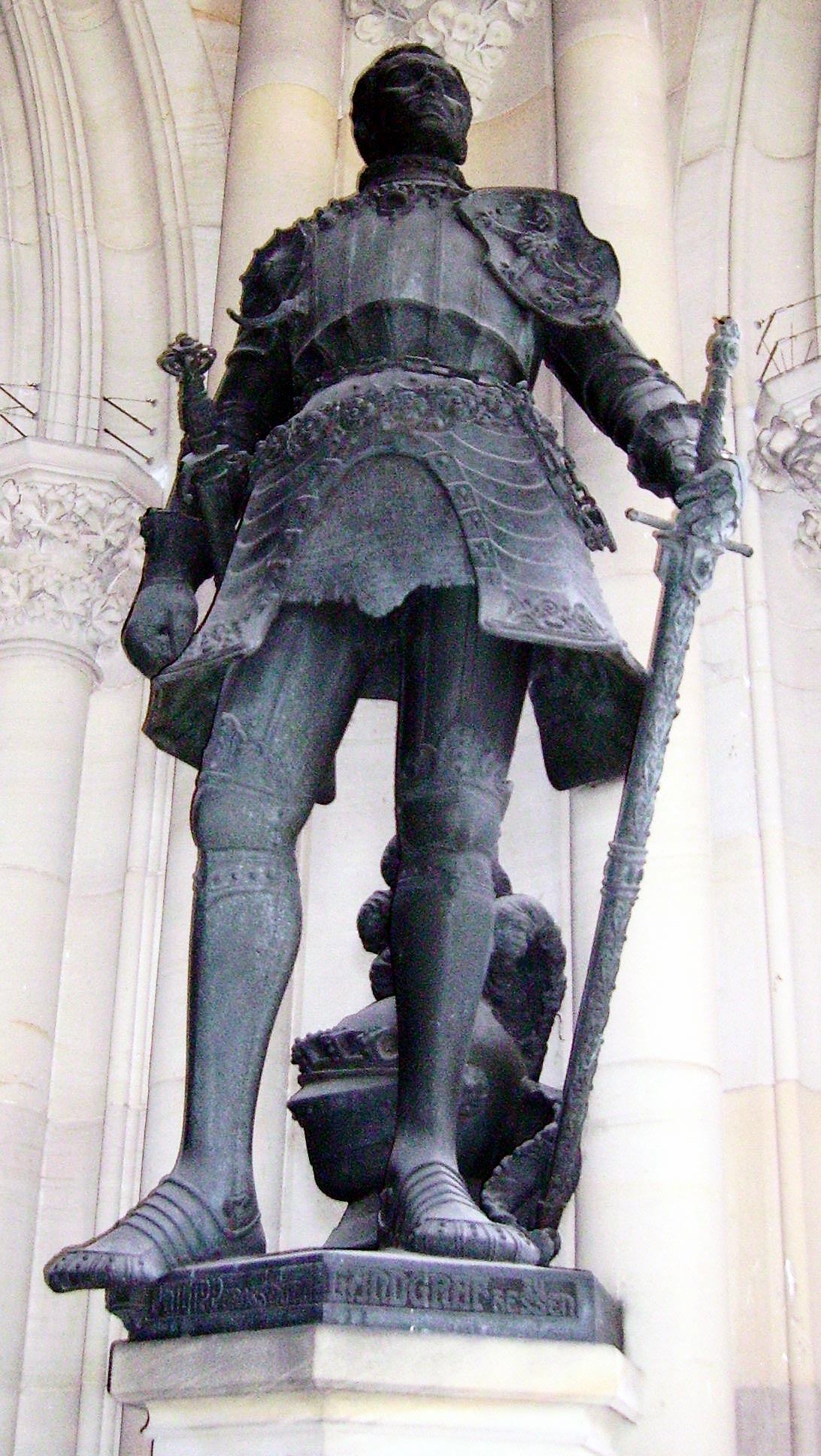
Philip I, Landgrave of Hesse

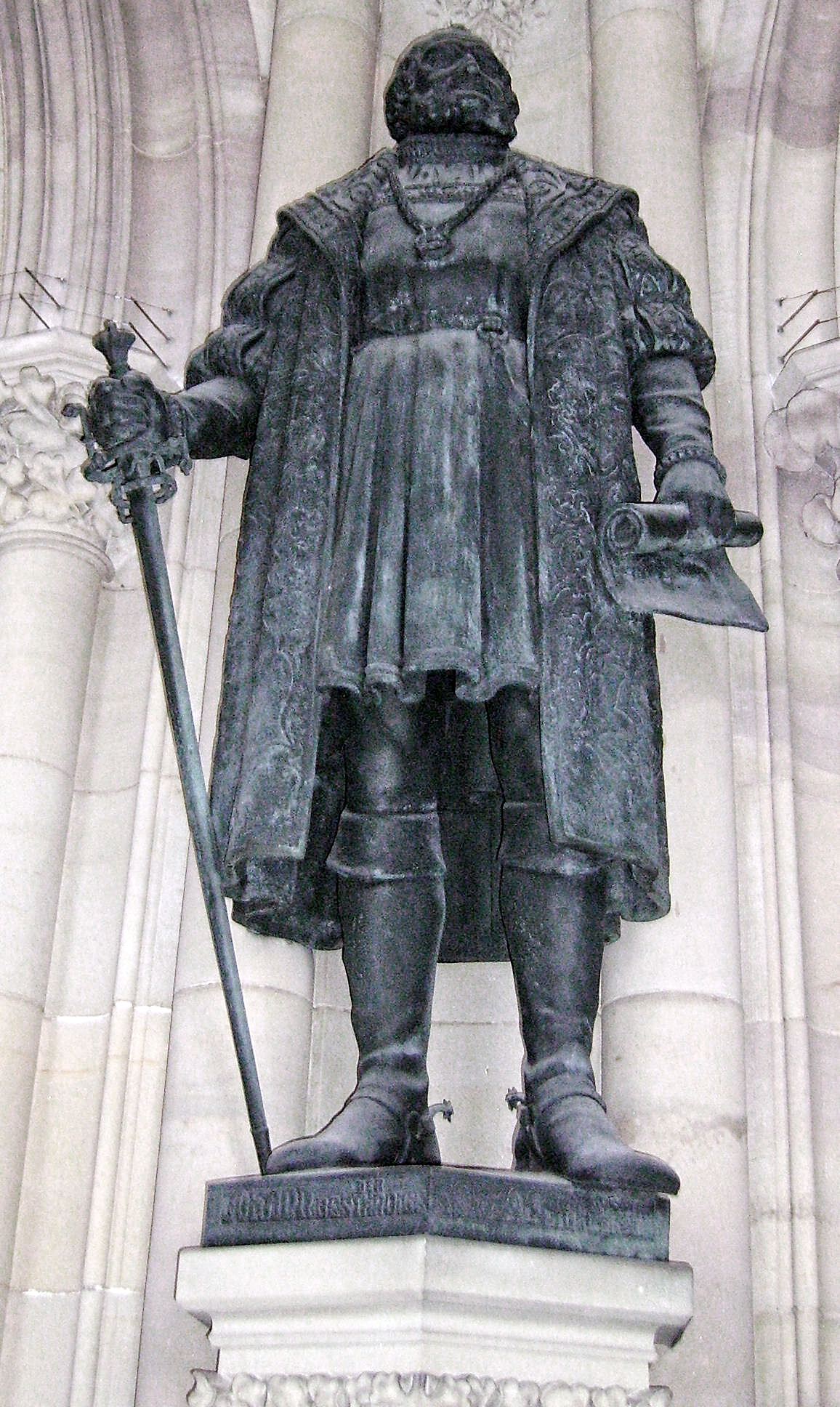
John, Elector of Saxony

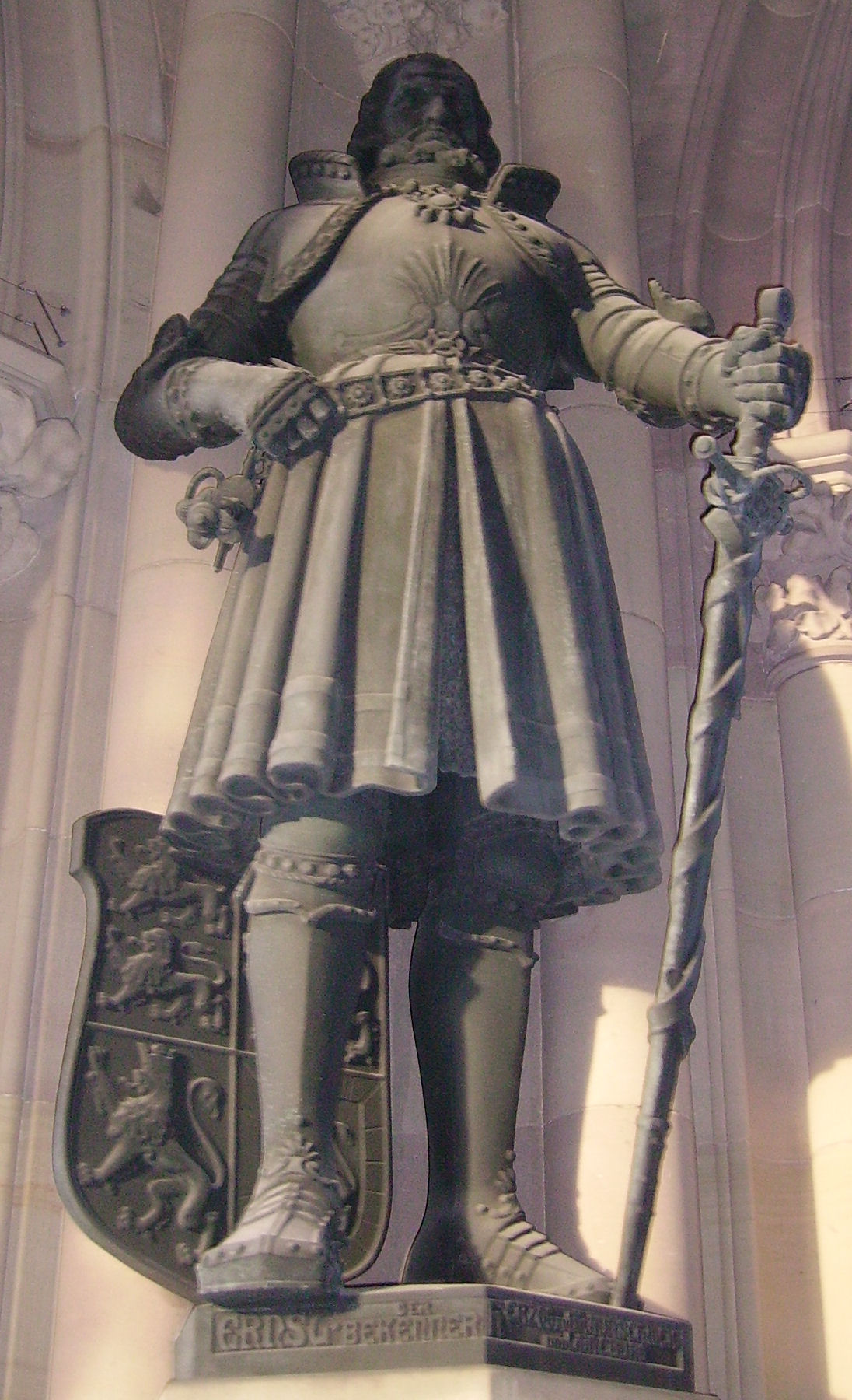
Ernest I, Duke of Brunswick-Lüneburg

=== Diet of 1542 ===
In 1542 a diet took place in Speyer from February 8 to April 11, again under the chairmanship of Ferdinand I. The major topic still was the Turkish threat on the south-eastern borders, especially after the Ottomans had just taken Ofen (today Budapest to the west of the Danube). The imperial estates agreed to a tax, the Common Penny to finance the imperial army. The diet of Regensburg in 1541 had resolved to discontinue the imperial tribunals and the banning of the Lutherans. Emboldened by this decision, the Protestants at the diet in Speyer demanded a completely renewed distribution of the posts for the totally Catholic Imperial Chamber Court excluding clerics and the acceptance of all imperial estates. But none of these demands were accepted.

=== Diet of 1544 ===
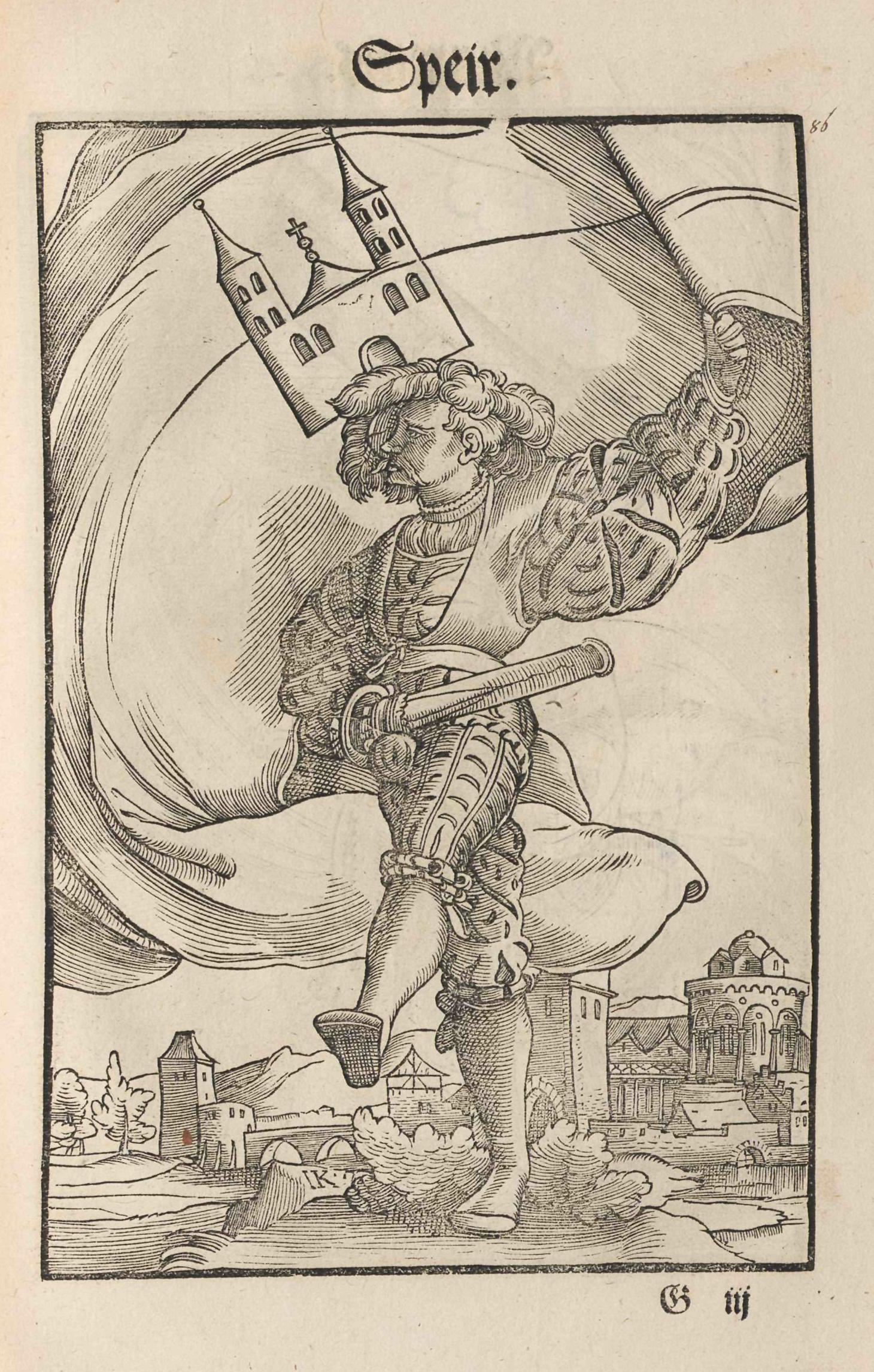
The Speyer Standard Bearer (1545). The round building in the bottom right corner is the Holy Sepulchre Church.

Great Charter of Speyer Jews of 1544, Insert in the confirmation of 1548, p. 1 of 7

The Diet of 1544 lasted from 20 February to 10 June. Concerning glamour, expenditures and appeal it surpassed all the previous diets in Speyer. This time, Emperor Charles V took part himself.

The Protestants were given an especially pompous entry into the city and Charles V could barely prevent Protestant sermons in the churches. Yet, even the Archbishop-Elector of Cologne, Hermann of Wied, allowed Lutheran sermons at his quarters in the Augustine monastery.

At the request of Charles V, topics of the diet were to be effective aid against the Turks, the support of the imperial actions against France which was allied with Turkey and, again, matters of faith. The emperor was inclined to compromises as he also sought the support of the Protestants for his policies.

The Protestants were not successful in getting the Edict of Worms revoked but the 1530 recess of Augsburg was suspended. There was no unity for funding of the imperial chamber court. As a result, the court was dissolved and it was only able to continue its work with an emergency staff at the request of the emperor.

The diet also decided upon the appropriation of secularised church assets such as churches, schools, poor houses or hospitals and held out the prospect of a national council which was to be discussed at another diet in autumn. The aid against the Turks was supported.

In the Treaty of Speyer (1544) the diet also settled a quarrel in the Baltic reflecting the decline of the Hanseatic League. At the insistence of the Dutch representatives Charles V renounced his claim to the crown of the Denmark. Therefore, the Dutch were granted access to the Baltic.

With the Great Charter of the Speyer Jews, Charles V granted the Jewish inhabitants of Speyer extensive liberties and guarantees. The charter was possibly induced by increasing restrictions and assaults on the Jews fuelled by the well-known antisemitic writings of Luther in 1543.

=== Diet of 1570 and Counter-Reformation ===
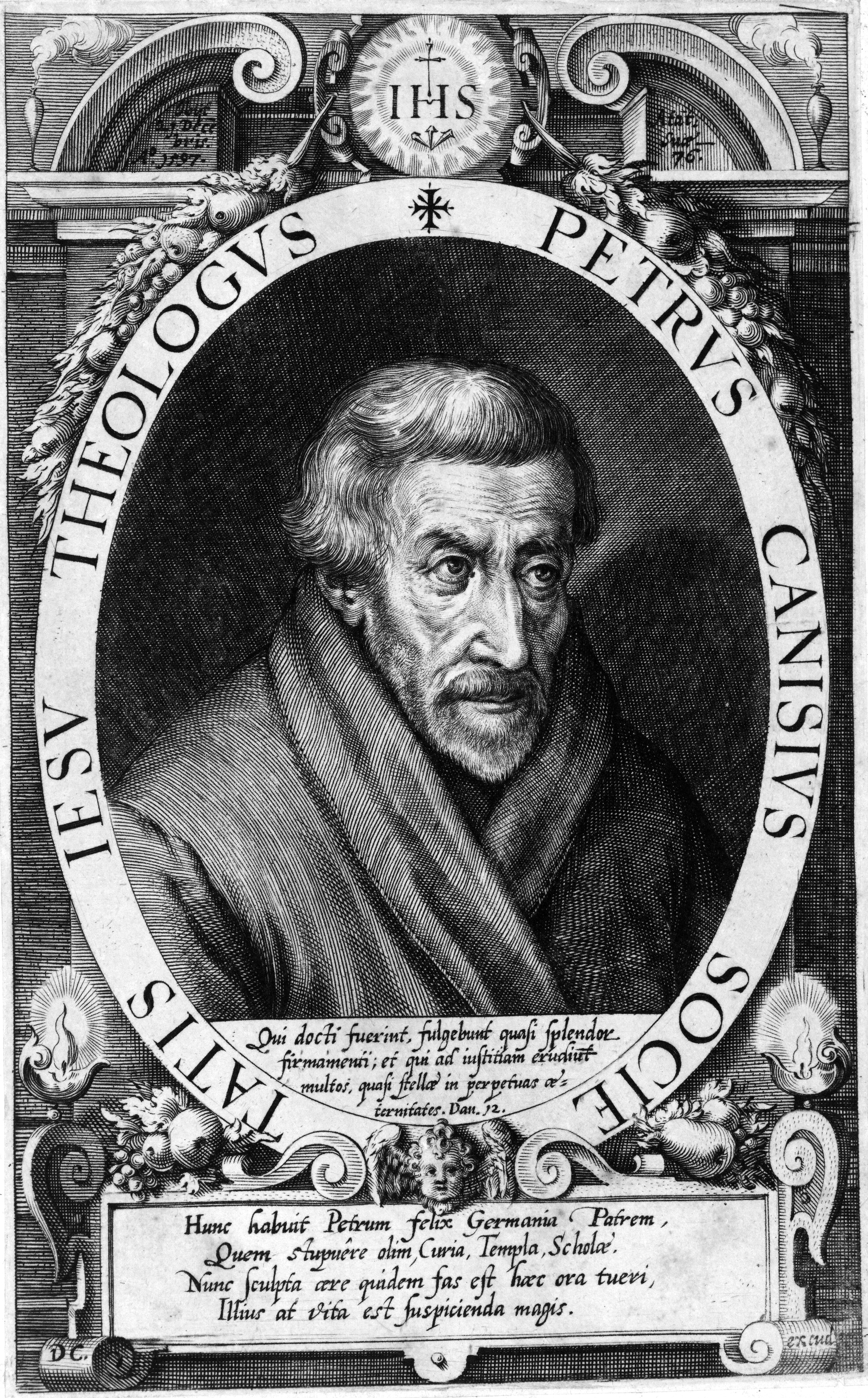
Peter Canisius

The last diet in Speyer assembled in 1570 under the reign of Maximilian II and already in full light of the Counter-Reformation instituted by the Council of Trent, which had finally taken place from 1545 to 1563 and was attended by the Speyer Bishop Marquard of Hattstein.

In Speyer, the Counter-Reformation made itself felt with the arrival of Peter Canisius in 1565. A Jesuit school with three classes was opened in May 1567. In the following year, the Jesuits opened a chapter by the cathedral with a Latin school which, by 1580, counted 230 students. The city council was concerned about religious peace in the city and vehemently opposed the Jesuits, but to no avail. Therefore, the council decreed that Catholic students were not to be given room and board.

Apart from this addition in Speyer, at the time of the diet the monasteries were in a pathetic state. The Monastery of the Holy Sepulchre was confiscated in 1567 by the count of Württemberg because the prior and convent had opted for the new creed. The council refused to return the church to the Dominicans. Their prior was arrested and excommunicated in 1576 for sodomy. The Franciscans had only one monk left and the buildings deteriorated. The church of the Augustinians was used by both confessions on the basis of a simultaneum contract. The women's monasteries were destitute and had become of no relevance to life in the city.

The diet of 1570 was the most splendid and the longest ever held in the west of the empire, far surpassing the assemblies of 1526 and 1529. Although, again, there were many princes, this diet started a trend to send delegates. At the same time, Speyer hosted an assembly of the cities. When Maximilian II entered the city, more than 500 people were counted in his entourage, including Empress Maria, the daughters Anne, Elisabeth, Eleonore, Margaret, the sons Maximilian, Mathew, Albert, Wenzel, 6 personal physicians, 27 falconers and hunters, a tamer, a guard for leopards, 2 paper hangers, 40 bakers, 15 craftsmen, an organ maker, 21 trumpeters and kettle-drummers, a band-master with 12 bassists, a Kammersänger (bass), 9 tenors, 13 alto singers, 7 discant players and about 16 choir boys.

With a population of around 8,000, this event was a heavy burden on Speyer bringing with it advantages and disadvantages. In preparation of the meeting, the council had several streets paved and temporary wooden huts built including a stable for the emperor's elephant, the first ever to come to Speyer. Compared to 1542, when the better-built houses in Speyer fit for guests numbered 210, this time there were 300. During the festivities, the emperor's daughter Elisabeth was wedded to the French King Charles IX; he was represented by the emperor's brother, Ferdinand II.

The assembly was opened on 13 July 1570 with Mass in the cathedral and dragged on for over 8 months. Major topics were a comprehensive imperial reform, further contributions against the Turks, rules for mercenaries on foot and on horse, new rules for the Reichskammergericht and rules for the imperial chancellery. Religion was no issue. There was absolutely no progress on the imperial reform. One of the decisions made was that printing presses would be allowed only in imperial or capital cities and universities. A treaty was concluded in which John Sigismund Zápolya abdicated as King of Hungary (Treaty of Speyer (1570) to become prince of Transylvania instead.

The diet took place in a time of economic crisis and famine which also affected Speyer. Bad weather caused crop failures and the heavy rains obstructed the journeys of the diet participants. The winter months from 1568 to 1573 were so cold that the Rhine froze and death rates escalated.

In 1572, St. Giles Church was left to the Calvinists. Thus, the second big branch of the Reformation took hold in Speyer.

== The Reichskammergericht (Imperial Chamber Court) ==
The decision to move the Reichskammergericht to Speyer in 1526, where it remained for 162 years, ended a time of constant moves. The building of the court stood in the vicinity of the cathedral at the site of the modern day restaurant Domhof. As an institution of the empire it was a stronghold of Catholicism in Germany at least until 1555. After it was almost dissolved in 1544 due to unsettled funding there were no court decisions until 1548. At the diet of 1548 in Augsburg the last Protestant procurator was dismissed and the court was renewed along Catholic lines. Despite increases in staff, in 1552, there were still more than 5,000 unsettled court cases which lead to the saying "Lites Spirae spirant, non exspirant".

In these decades, the court was mainly concerned with religious matters. As the staff was purely Catholic, the verdicts were markedly partisan which aggravated the religious tensions in the empire and so contributed to the formation of the Schmalkaldic League, a defensive alliance of Lutheran princes. This was not without repercussions for Speyer. Sympathies for the new creed could not be expressed with the same ardour as in other imperial cities.

In the Augsburg Settlement of 1555, it was agreed that the court would be staffed equally with Catholics and Protestants. Nevertheless, implementation took until 1648. Including families, servants and staff, it is estimated that there were between 630 and 800 people involved with the court and they made up 8 to 10% of the city's population. Clerics made up about the same proportion. On one hand, these two groups had a considerable influence on city life, on the other, they were both exempt from city taxes leading to many complaints of the city before the emperor in the 16th and 17th century. The emperor usually decided in favour of the court.

In 1577 the Reichskammergericht was made up of 129 men including 44 accredited advocates. In addition, there were trainees, solicitors and aggrieved parties.

The court's presence seems to have had a positive influence in another aspect. In Speyer, remarkably, only one woman accused of witchcraft was put to the stake. In an account from 1581 it says "Barbara, Hans Kölers burgers weib, eine zauberin, ist den 25. Januarij verbrendt wordenn" (Barbara, the wife of citizen Hans Köler, a witch, was burnt on 25 January). The reason for this influence is seen in the high level of reason and adherence to judicial procedures that distinguished Speyer before other cities of the empire. The court constantly had to deal with witch trials and mostly decided in favour of the accused. For obvious reasons it was seen as an appellate court.

== Destruction and decline ==
=== Uneasy peace ===
Apart from an event in 1552, the years from 1530 to 1620 remained comparably peaceful. Yet, Speyer was not spared from other kinds of misfortune. There were repeated epidemics of the plague, e. g. in 1539, 1542, 1555 and 1574. The Schmalkaldic War in 1546 had no direct effects. Speyer benefited from the official introduction of the Reformation in the Palatinate by Frederick II as of April 1546.

In 1552, the Protestant margrave Albert Alcibiades of Brandenburg, on a raiding tour of church possessions, did not spare the bishopric of Speyer. The city put up no resistance and opened its gates. The soldiers plundered the church estates and demanded ransom from Bishop Rudolf von und zu Frankenstein who was at his palace in Udenheim. Because of the bishop's unexpected death and the resulting delay in the negotiations the margrave continued his raids from 19 to 23 August, not only affecting the church but also the city. At least it was later able to retrieve some of the important documents and books.

Within the walls of Speyer there was a constant quarrel between the Protestant citizens and the Catholic clergy with mutual accusations, jibes, defamations and interferences. The privileges of the church, based on the mediation settlement of 1284, were still valid. Clerics and the still mainly Catholic Reichskammergericht were seen as a foreign body in the city.

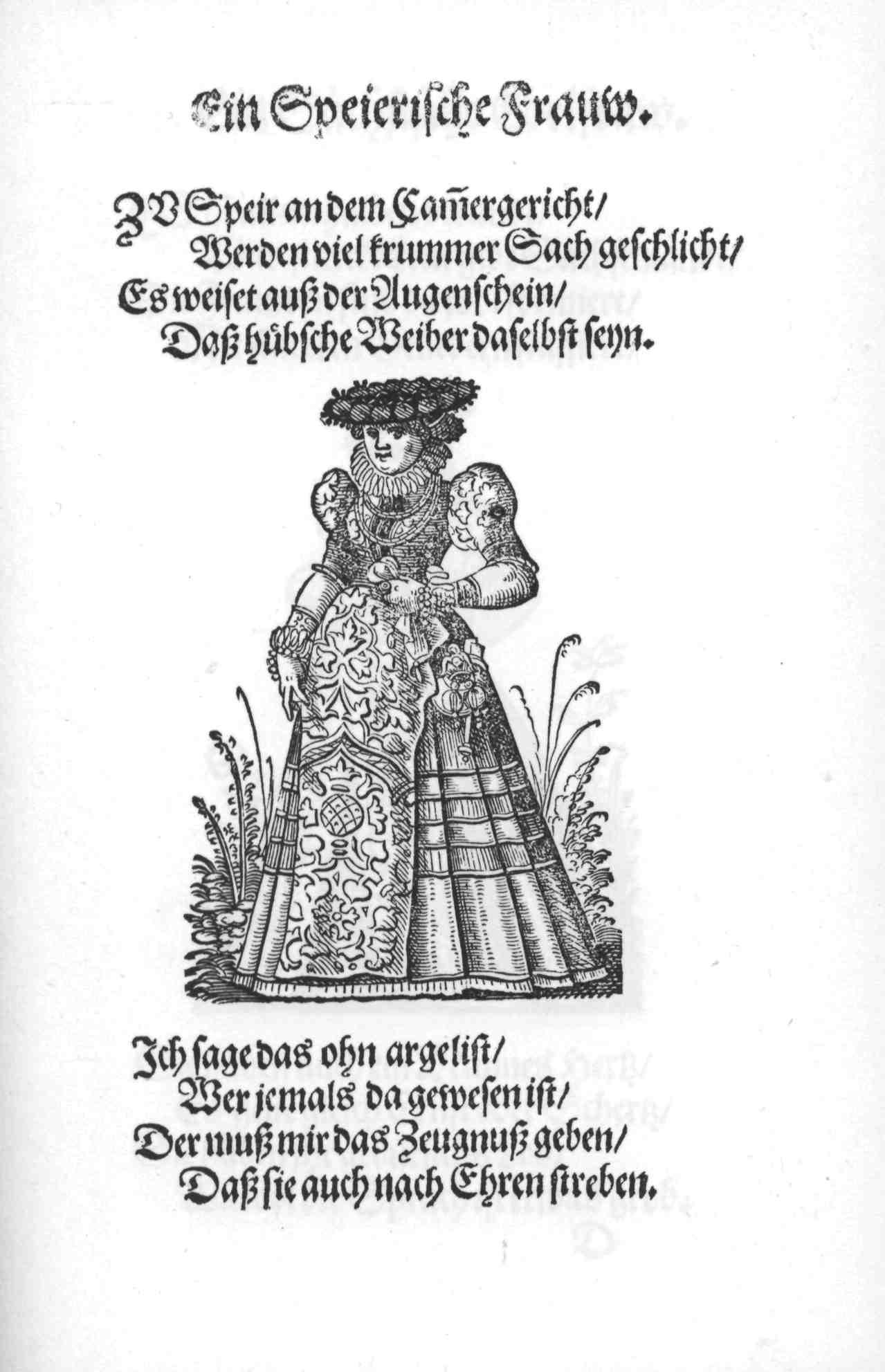
Ladies' fashion in Speyer of 1586

After siding with the Protestants, the 17th century in Speyer was distinguished by its alliance with the Protestant Union and by the influence of the Catholic League personified by the Bishop of Speyer.

Around 1600, the balances found in the compromise of 1555 at Peace of Augsburg was in crisis. The increasing success of the Counter-Reformation in turn caused a backlash by the Protestants for which the Palatinate became a leading force. The decades of adhesion in the empire, largely due to the wars against the Turks, fell away after the cease fire agreement of 1606.

In 1581, the decided Catholic Eberhard von Dienheim became bishop of Speyer. The Protestants had been thinking about filling the post with a Protestant prince and even considered the secularisation of the Speyer prince-bishopric. A visitation of the prince-bishopric in 1583 found that the life-style and sense of duty among the clerics left much to be desired. As a result, the Jesuits were asked to intensify their efforts. In 1599, the Speyer Catholic Hymnbook was introduced and in 1602 the bishop had Capuchins settle in the bishopric. The bishop lived well beyond his means and by 1605 the bishopric had accumulated a debt of 126,000 guilders. The differences between city and bishop remained continued unabatedly.

Speyer joined the Protestant Union in 1610 and maintained close relations with other imperial cities in southern Germany with mounting tensions between the Catholic League and the Union. In 1613, Bishop Philipp Christoph von Sötern began construction of the new episcopal palace in Speyer. Under protest of Speyer he also started the expansion of his main residence in Udenheim into a fortress. As of 1623, Udenheim was renamed Philippsburg. The League regarded this fortress as counterbalance against the Palatine fortress in Mannheim. On 20 July 1612, the city council decreed the construction of a Protestant consistory. In 1616, a school for Catholic girls was set up from which emerged the school of the St. Magdalen's Monastery which still exists today.

In 1612, the scribe of Speyer, Christoph Lehmann published the Chronicles of the Free Imperial City of Speyer. The book became very popular because it also shed light on the history of the empire and in the following centuries it was reprinted 4 times.

In 1618, Speyer participated in dismantling the bishop's fortress in Udenheim along with an army of Palatine and Baden but construction was soon taken up again.

=== Thirty Years' War ===
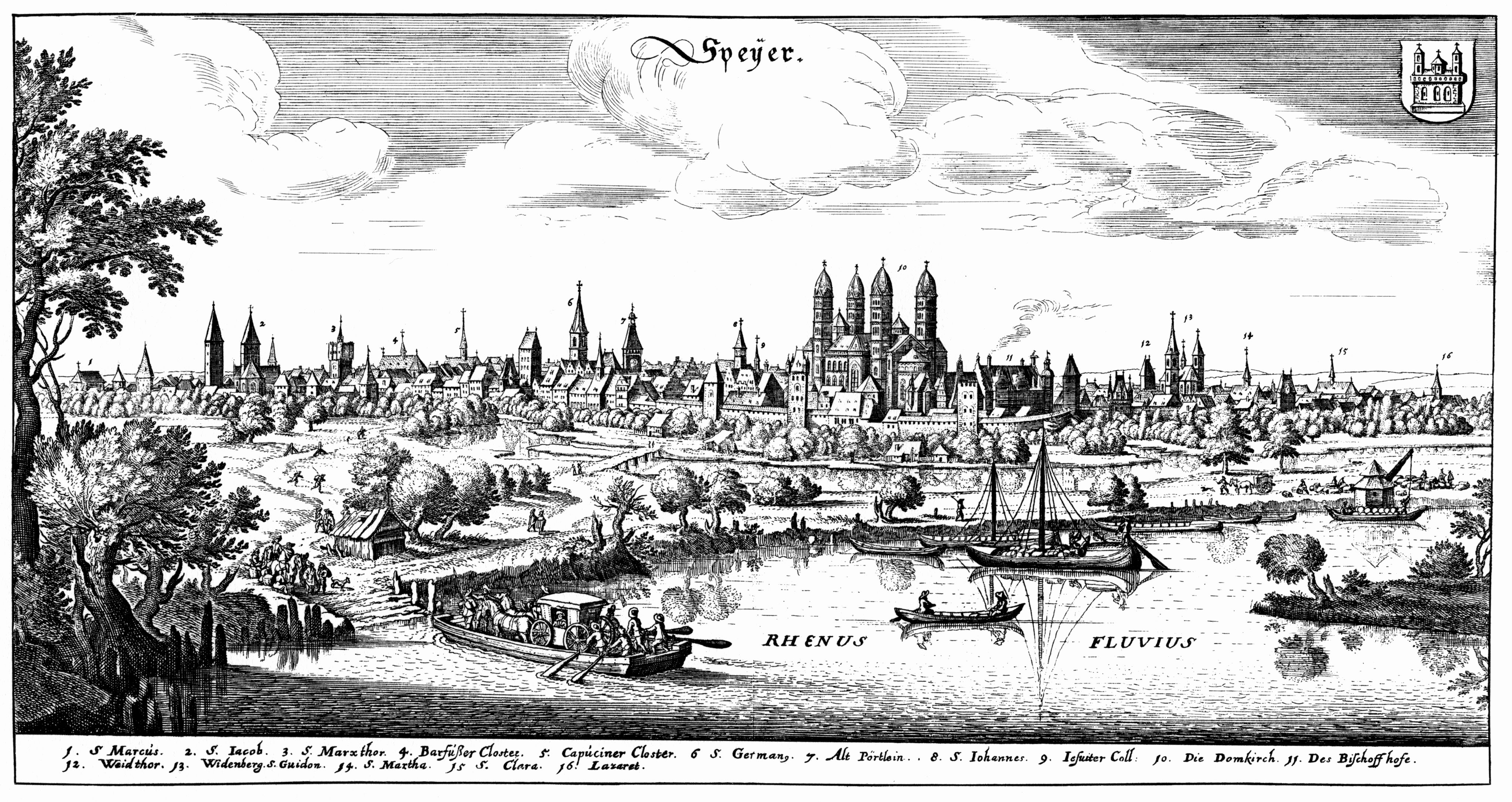
Speyer 1637, depicted by Merian

In the turmoil of the Thirty Years’ War, Speyer met the fate of most imperial cities. Membership in the Protestant Union, obligations to the empire which sided with the Catholics, ties with surrounding territories that actively fought for the Union or the League, cost the city dearly. On the one side, Speyer was constantly drawn upon for war expenses, on the other, trade and commerce was impaired by the hostilities which led to widespread indebtedness and poverty. Speyer could less and less afford to pay for its defence and, like many other imperial cities, saw itself forced to take a neutral stance. Therefore, in 1621, Speyer left the Protestant Union. Neutrality in the face of the empire was a novelty and especially the emperor insisted on the allegiance the imperial cities owed him. For Protestant cities like Speyer this resulted in a constant balancing act between the Union and the League.

Within its walls, the Lutheran magistrate of Speyer had to get along with the bishop, four endowments and a Catholic minority. Neighbouring and allied Palatine had become Calvinist. Speyer's participation in sacking the Udenheim fortress was to cost it dearly. The bishop sued for damages and 10 years after the war started was awarded 150,000 guilders. After the Protestant Union disintegrated and at the culmination of his power in 1628, the emperor passed the Edict of Restitution according to which the religious and territorial situations reached before 1555 were to be restored. Since no Catholic territories had been secularised in the area of Speyer this had little effect for the city.

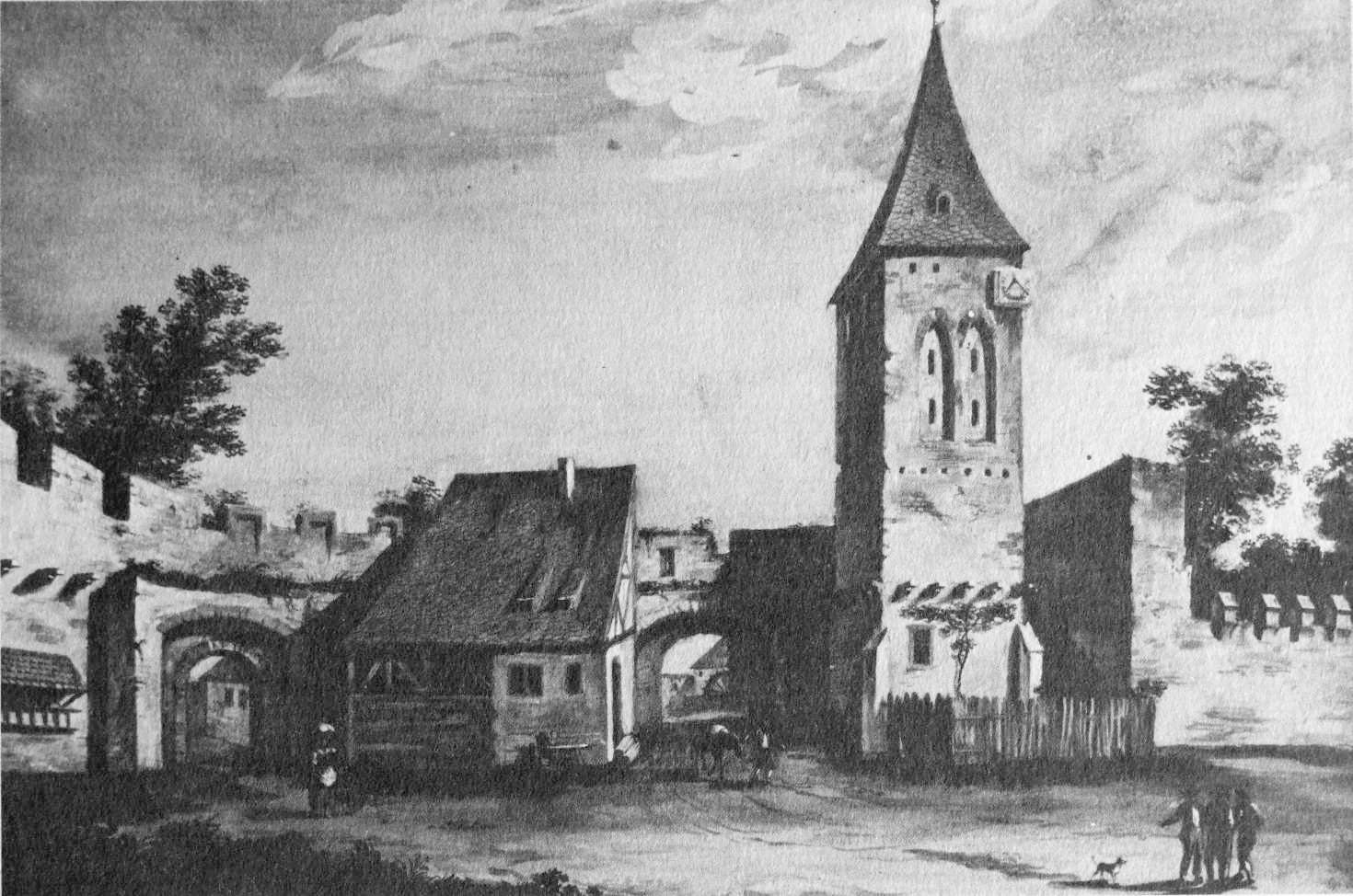
Fortifications at the Speyer Fish Market. Sketch around 1760.

Although it was a walled city, in the range of the often embattled fortresses of Frankenthal, Friedrichsburg, Philippsburg and Landau, Speyer was hardly able to defend itself. Thus, the town took on the roles of refuge, military hospital, supply post and troop camp. The Spanish, allies of the League, occupied the Palatinate. Philippsburg became a staging point for military operations by the League. Speyer had to endure troops marching through, quarterings and taxations and had to accommodate wounded and refugees. In addition, from 1632 to 1635, it was occupied by Swedish, Imperial, French and again Imperial troops in quick succession. Urbain de Maillé-Brézé who had participated in the Siege of La Rochelle (1627–1628) conquered Speyer after a siege on 21 March 1635, together with Jacques-Nompar de Caumont, duc de la Force, at the head of the Army of Germany (Armée d'Allemagne). In 1644, once more the Imperial Army occupied the city and finally the French until 1650. Every time the city was forced to make payments and supply goods. In 1632 the city was struck by the plague and in 1636/37 by famine.

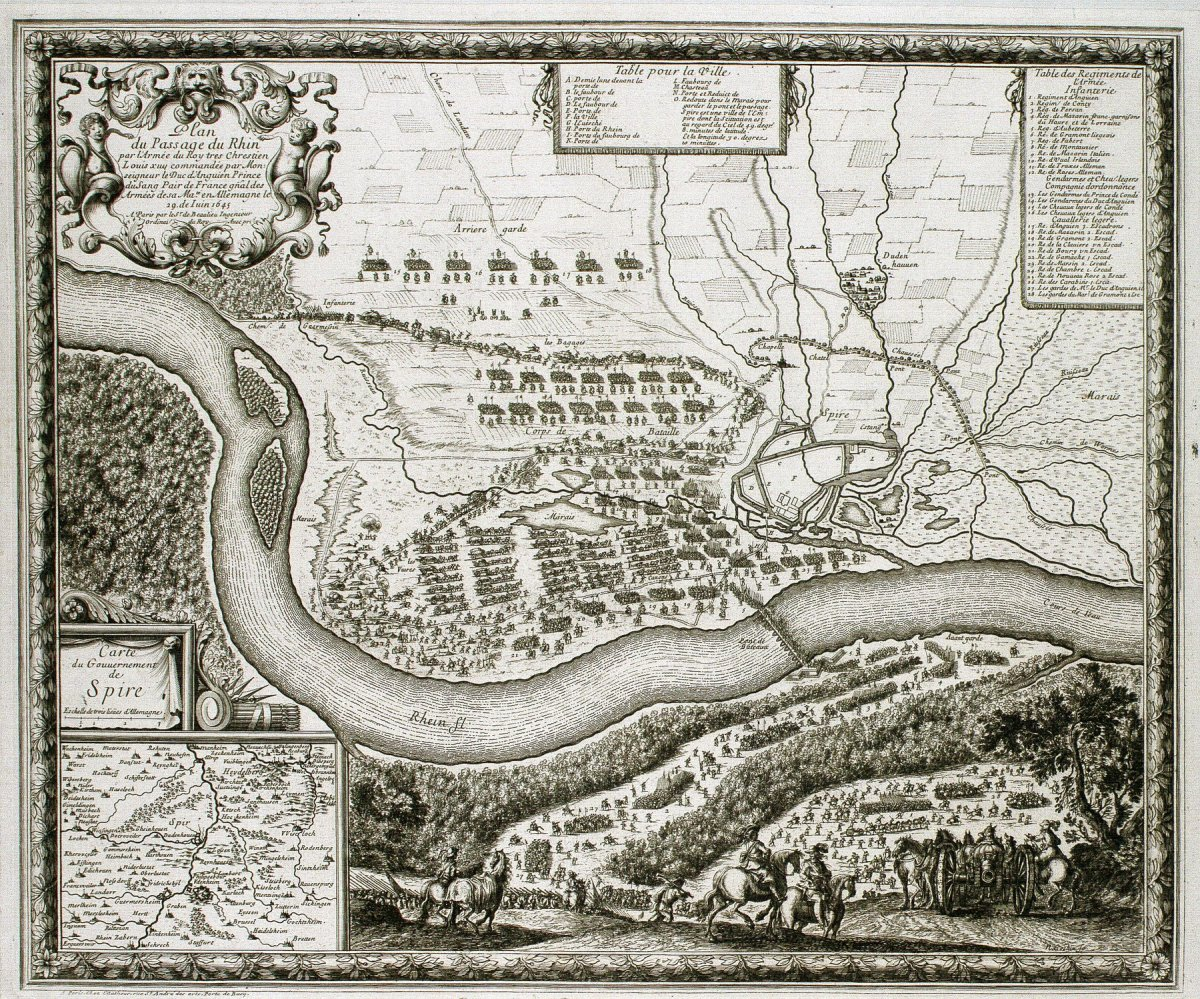
Map of the French crossing the Rhine near Speyer on 19 June 1645

Yet, Speyer was very lucky to survive the Thirty Years' War almost without destruction; nearby Mannheim had been totally destroyed. But the number of inhabitants had declined considerably and the suburb of St. Marcus was abandoned. In council minutes of 1653 there is mention of a loss of 25%. This was partially made up by refugees that settled in Speyer.

According to the peace settlement of 1648 the empire had to pay Sweden an indemnity amount of 5 million in gold (Swedish Satisfaction), of which 37,000 guilders fell upon Speyer. The imperial cities were still required to pay a levy to the empire called Roman Month of which Speyer had to pay 25, partially by force. The Spaniards demanded 500,000 imperial Talers before they retreated from the fortress of Frankenthal. This sum also had to be paid in part by the imperial cities and Speyer was constantly negotiating for loans or reduction settlements.

Speyer was not alone with its financial problems; the whole empire was affected. The modalities of the debts were defined in 1654 in the recess of the diet at Regensburg but trials and negotiations because of the indebted cities dragged on into the '70s. Matters for Speyer got more complicated when it lost its staple right along the Rhine at the instigation of the Palatinate.

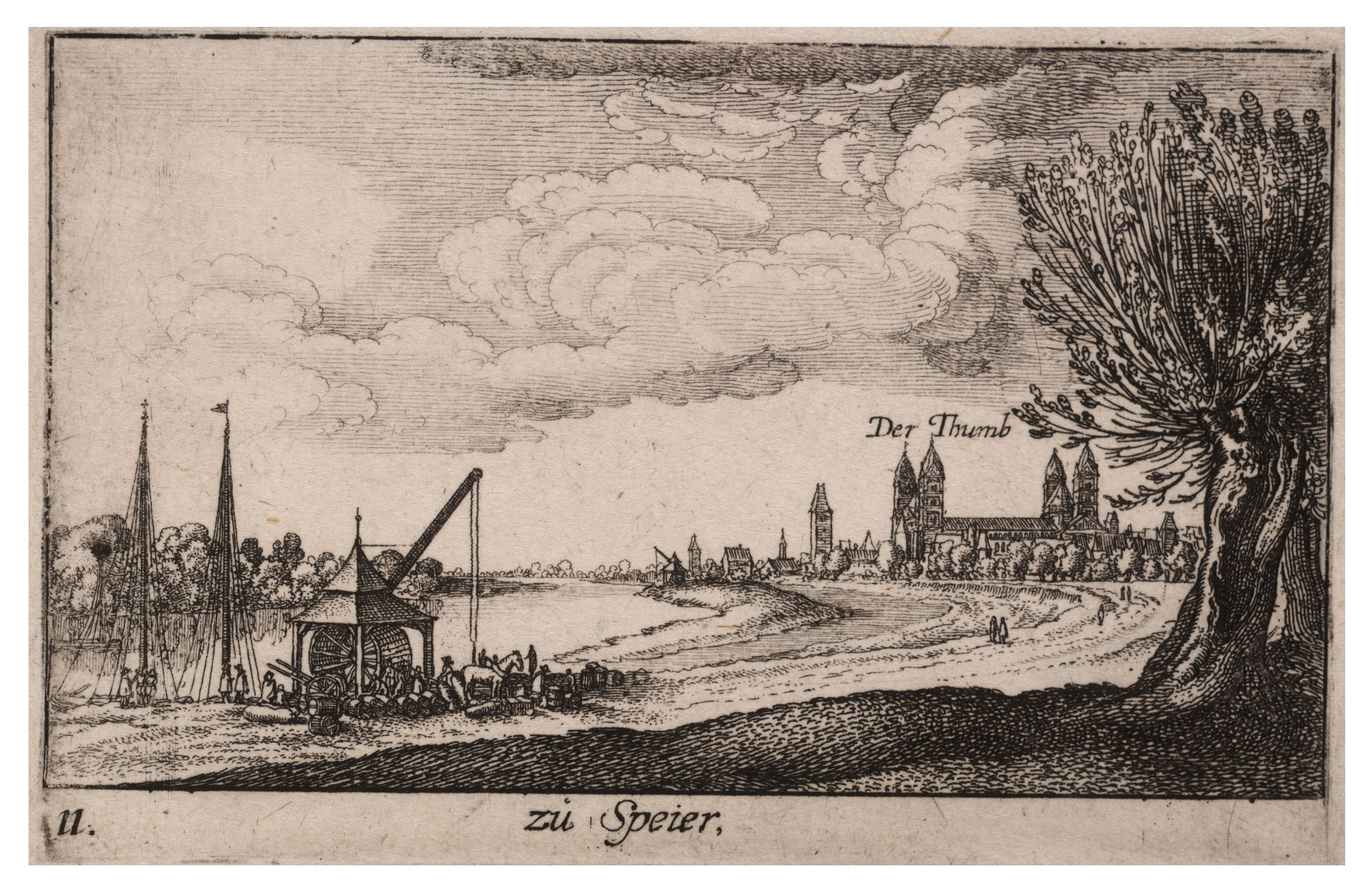
Speyer around 1650

In the years following the peace treaty, disputes between city, bishop and clerics continued as before. The bishop of Speyer still had his residence not in town but in Philippsburg (Udenheim); the city was still anxious to prevent rule by a bishop and obstructed the activities of the bishop's functionaries in any way possible. In 1653, a big quarrel ensued about the use of a road across the Rheinhausen meadow to the Rhine ferry, a connection important to the Bishop Lothar Friedrich von Metternich-Burscheid. Both parties repeatedly brought forward grievances and complaints. In 1670, Mayor Johann Mühlberger was accused of plotting to surrender the city to the bishop and deposed for treason.

In the meantime, the European balance of power had shifted in favour of France which gained pre-eminence. It set an aggressive territorial expansion in motion with a new phase of wars. Preparations became visible when the fortress of Philippsburg, in French hands, was enforced. In 1661, Landau was annexed by France and fortified; the French annexed the Duchy of Lorraine in 1670 and Strassburg in 1681. The Franco-Dutch War, in which France aimed to annex the Spanish Netherlands, brought destruction to the Palatinate and Germerheim, thus near Speyer. In negotiations with the French, the city managed to remain neutral. The Palatinate could not accept Speyer's neutrality; it occupied nearby Dudenhofen in 1676, the watch towers of the landwehr and the suburb of Hasenpfuhl, thus putting pressure on the city. In the same year, an imperial army recaptured Philippsburg. In 1683, Speyer again had to pay contributions to the empire because of a renewed threat in the southeast by the Turks this time supported by the French. The Turkish threat enabled the French to expand their borders towards the Rhine without any resistance by the empire.

=== Nine Years' War (War of the Palatine Succession) ===
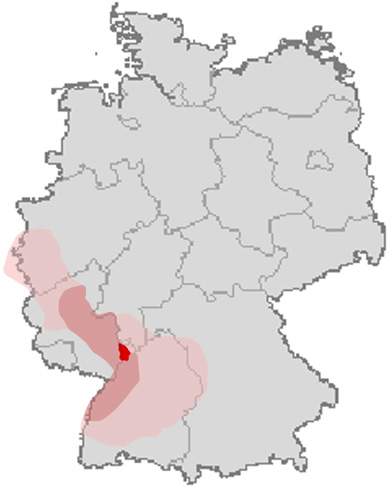
Areas affected by the Nine Years' War (imposed on modern-day borders)

The death of Charles II, Elector Palatine was another occasion for the French for their next step. King Louis XIV illegally demanded the Palatine as inheritance for Charles' sister and his sister-in-law Elizabeth Charlotte, Madame Palatine, starting the Nine Years' War (1688–1697) which affected Count Palatine and large parts of southwestern Germany. One of the first hostilities was the capture of the fortresses of Philippsburg in October 1688 and of Mainz. Having to retreat after initial successes, at the orders of war minister Louvois and his closest confidant Chamlay, the French armies systematically laid waste to abandoned areas. Settlements in the Pfalz region and northern Baden were especially hard hit.

The city of Speyer was to meet the same fate. In early 1689, on their way from the fortress of Landau, French troops under General Joseph de Montclar appeared at the gates which were opened in the hope of being spared. After the French took the city over, they established headquarters in the Carmelite monastery. Two days after they inspected the city's fortifications, Montclar ordered them to be demolished on 30 January. Large sections of the city wall and most of the towers had to be broken down. Some of the gates were even blown up. The French also had in mind to blow up the Altpörtel gate. Preparations were stopped after the Carmelites convinced the general that the explosion would endanger the dilapidated monastery.

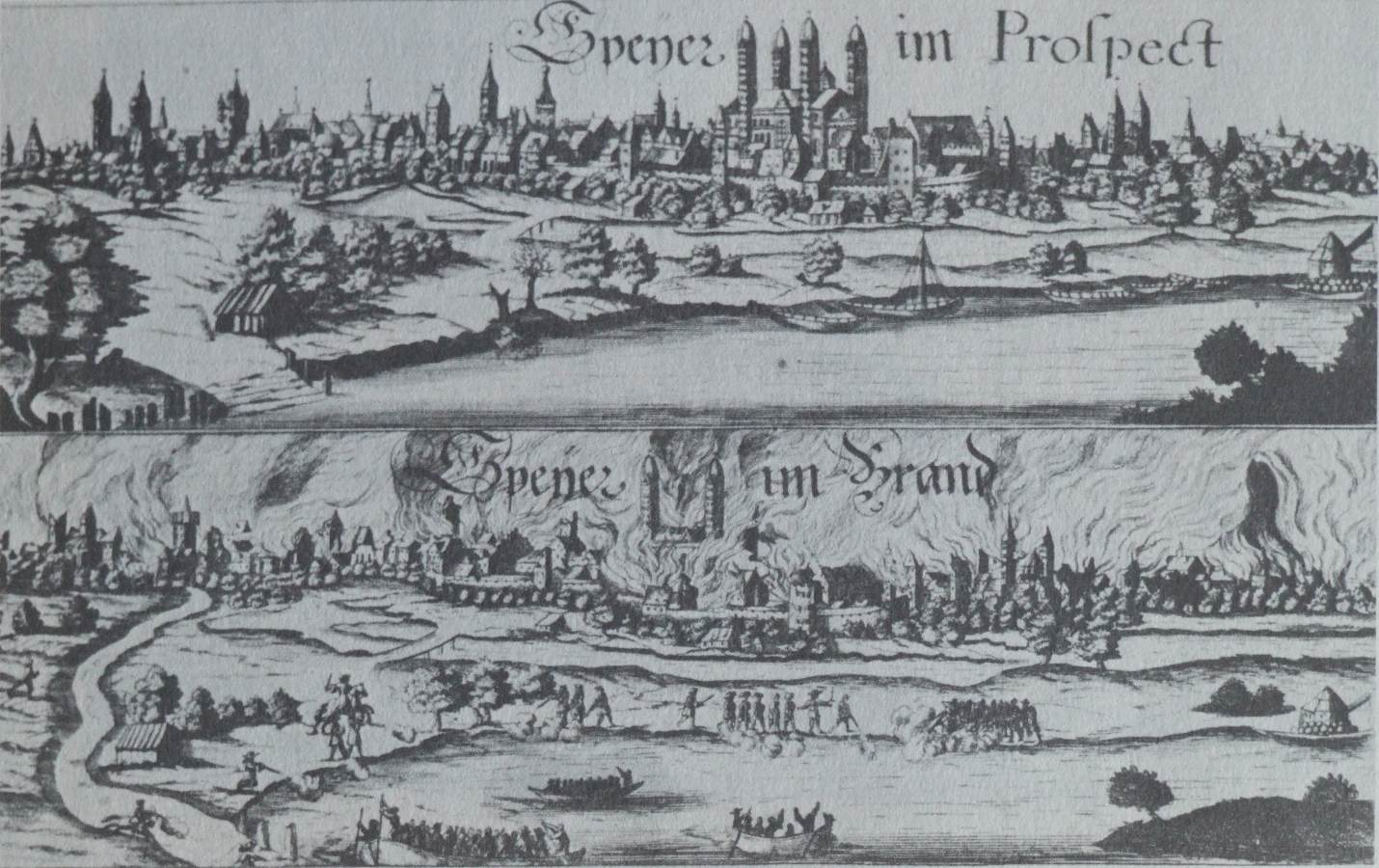
Speyer before and during the fire of 1689. Two etchings on a pamphlet by Johann Hoffmann, Nuremberg, 1689

On 23 May, General Duras ordered the city to be evacuated within one week. He let the people believe that the city would not be put to the torch. Four days later, Montclar announced to the bishop that he had received orders to burn the whole city except the cathedral. Not so happy about this order, the French generals supplied the citizens with carts to move their belongings. Whatever was left they were allowed to store in the cathedral. The cathedral chapter had the cathedral treasure brought to safety in Mainz. The French did not want the people to flee across the Rhine and offered them resettlement areas in Alsace and Lorraine including free building lots, 10 years no tax and support for transportation. As in Heidelberg and Mannheim, only few accepted this offer.

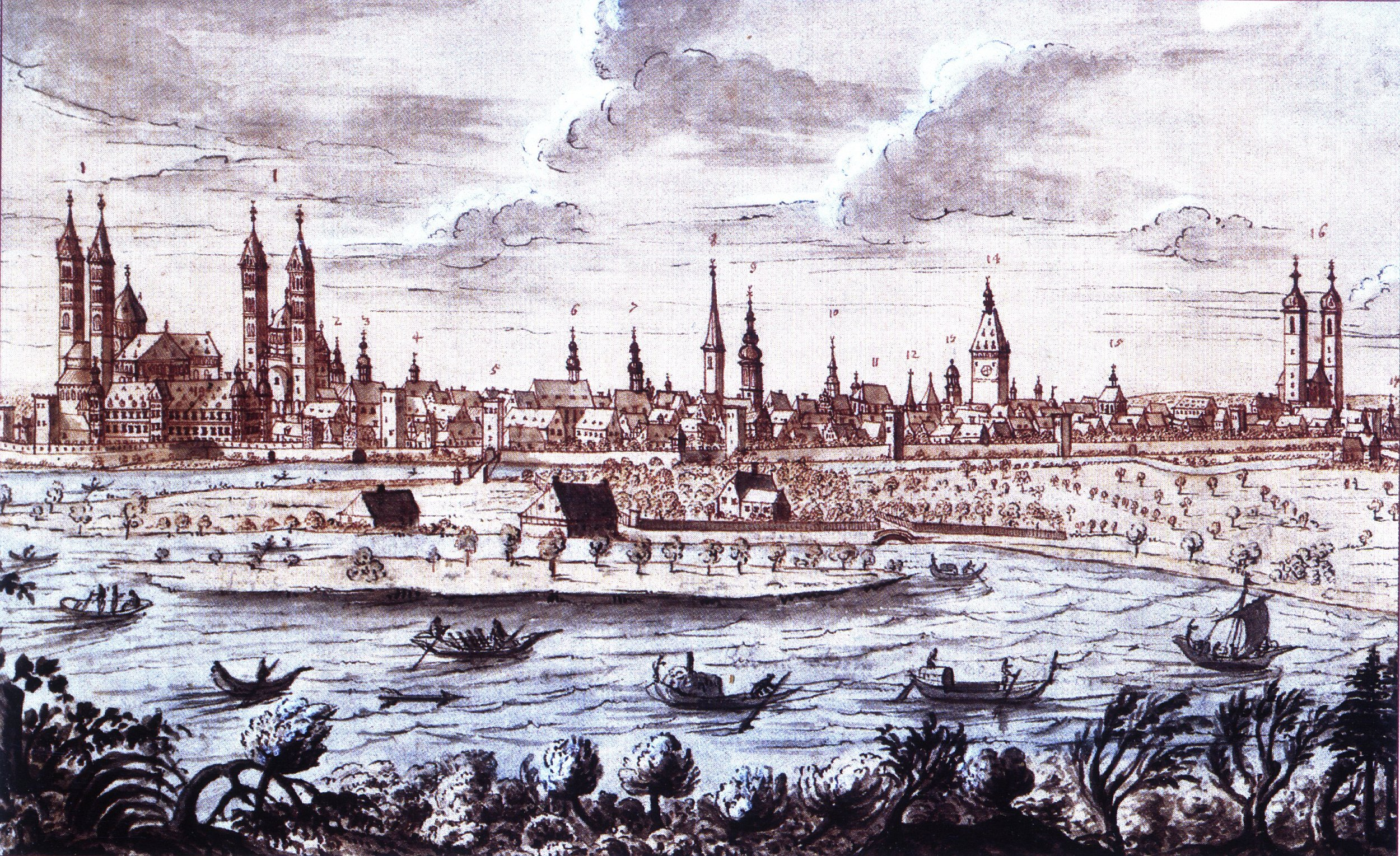
Speyer before 1750, revealing damage caused in 1689

Those who didn't make it across the river fled into the forest hoping that Speyer would be spared. From the French they had heard that German troops were close. Yet, their hope was in vain. On Pentecost Tuesday, 31 May, the French moved to a field camp on Germansberg and in the afternoon set fire to the city starting simultaneously at Weidenberg and Stuhlbrudergasse. The fire was so intense that the cathedral was in danger even though it had been deemed safe. The bishop's vicegerent, Heinrich Hartard von Rollingen, had the most precious graves brought into the deanery. On the night of 1 and 2 June, a thunderstorm whipped up the flames and the bell tower caught fire. The fire was extinguished three times, yet the cathedral again started burning. When, at last, the poorly accessible eastern dome caught fire, the cathedral could not be saved. In addition, drunken soldiers were caught in the cathedral playing with fire. In the ensuing chaos, some soldiers managed to break into the upper imperial graves only to be driven out by the fire.

After the fire had burned down the whole extent of the damage became visible. The city was almost totally destroyed. Only the Gilgenvorstadt (suburb), the St. Klara Monastery in Altspeyer (suburb), the mikwe, the Altpörtel and a few other buildings remained intact; the cathedral was heavily damaged. The Imperial Chamber Court was in ruins. As the French did not allow the population of Speyer to return it dispersed in the whole southwest German region with focal points in Frankfurt, where the council fled, and in Strassburg.

=== Reconstruction 1698–1792 ===
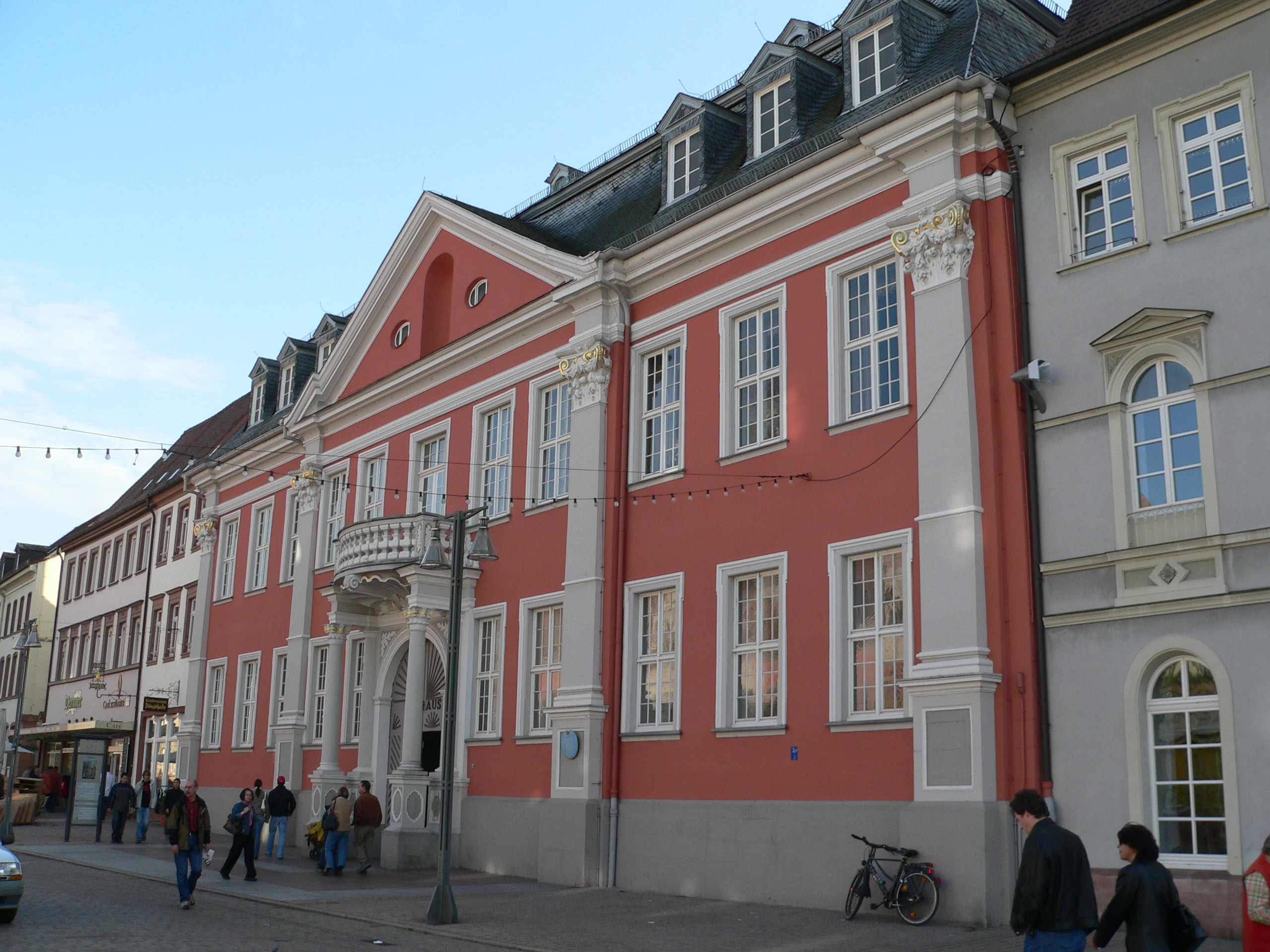
Old City Hall, 1712 and 1726 by Johann Adam Breunig

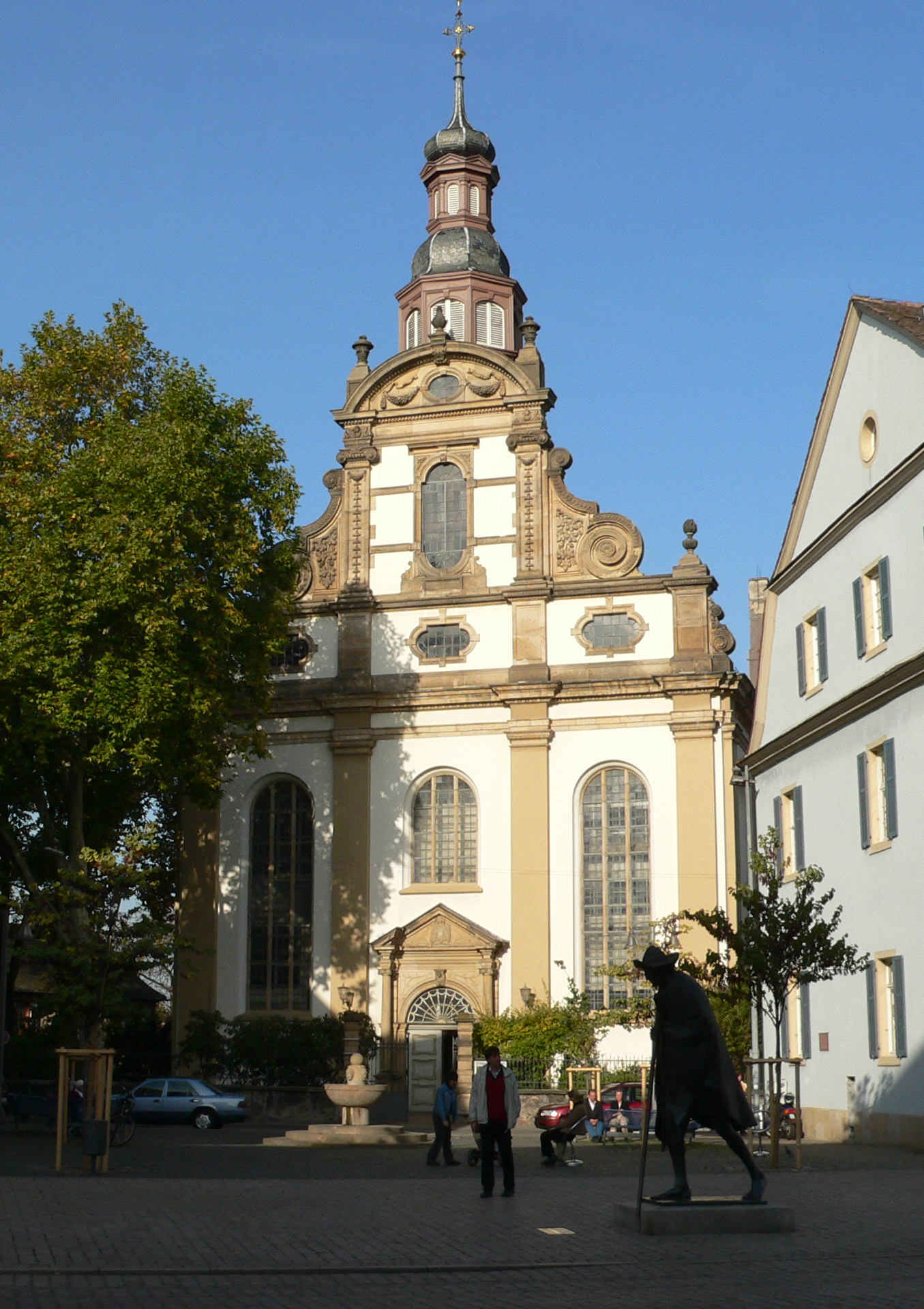
Dreifaltigkeitskirche (Trinity Church)

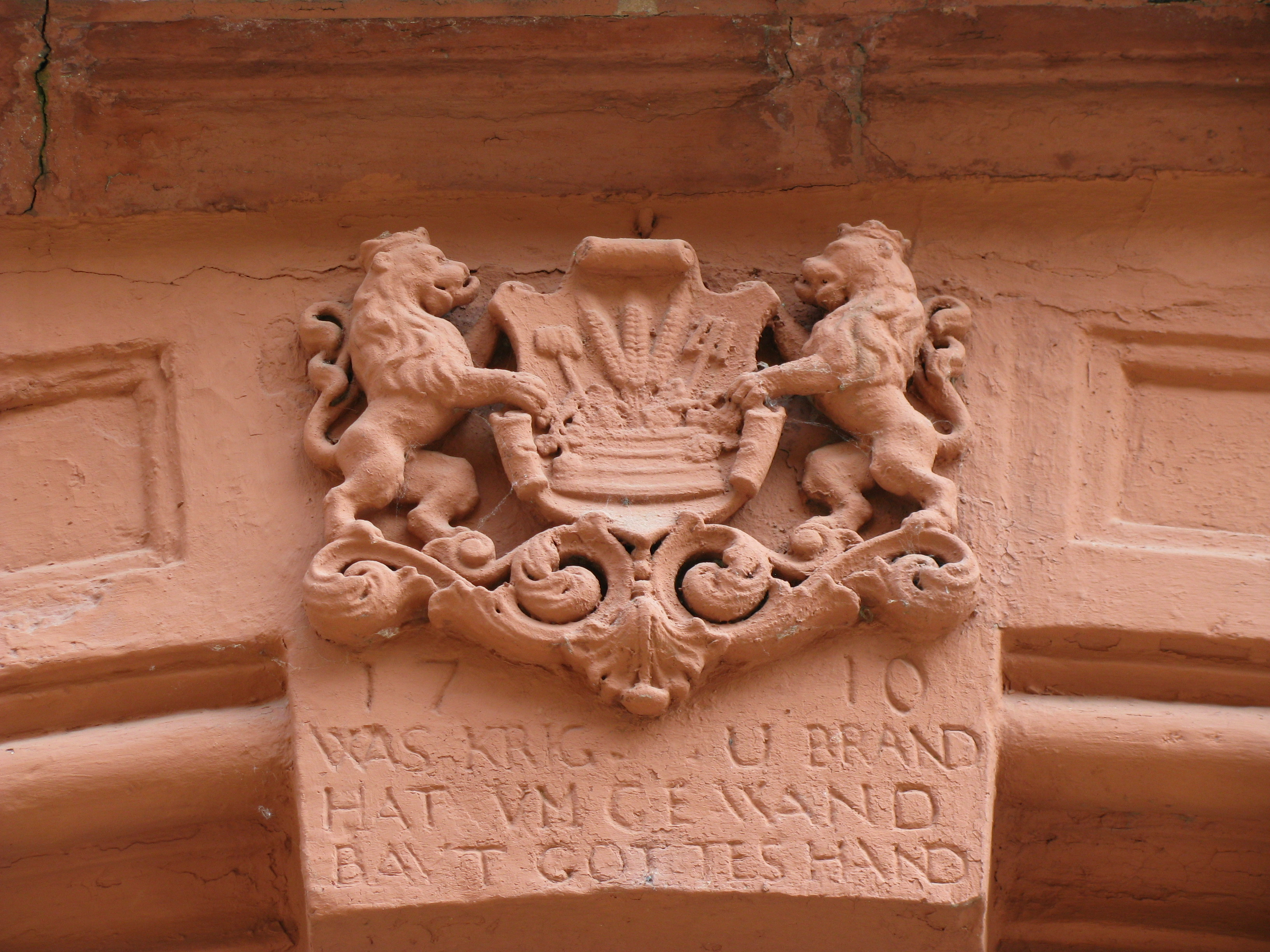
Inscription referring to the reconstruction on a house on Johannesstrasse

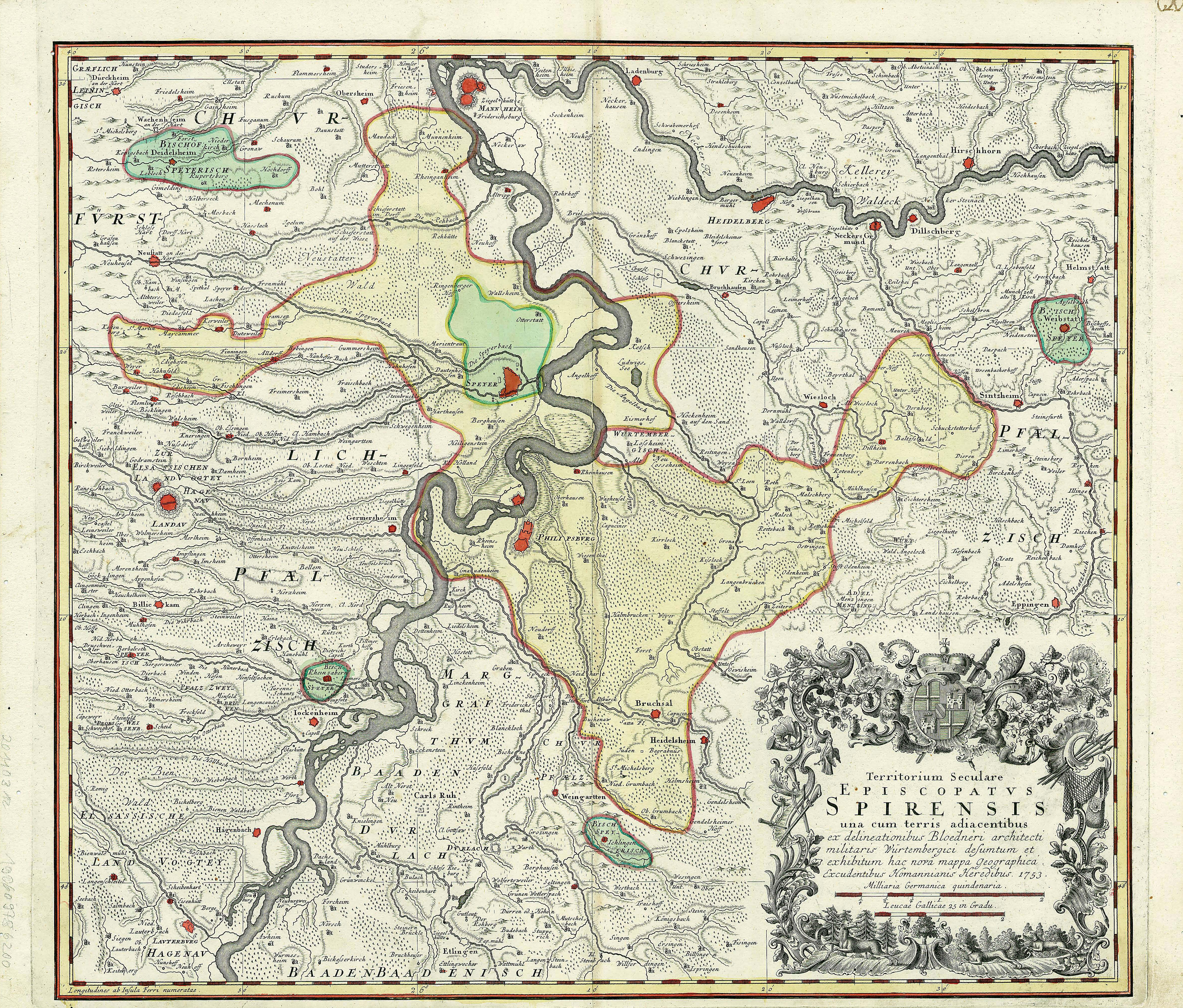
Map of the Prince-Bishopric of Speyer 1735. The blue line marks the territory of the Imperial City of Speyer (white area).

As of 1698, the Speyer city council got in touch with the scattered population, raised money and offered incentives for returning to the destroyed city. This included tax incentives but also threatening with the confiscation of abandoned property. The Imperial Chamber Court was relocated to Wetzlar; as a result, this population group important to Speyer did not return. But, another group, the clergy, especially the Allerheiligen, St. Guido and the Cathedral endowments soon set about to ignite urban life at the fringes of the city.

Notable buildings in the years of reconstruction still standing today are the first baroque churches in Speyer, the Protestant Reformed Heiliggeistkirche (Holy Ghost Church), 1700–1702, and the Lutheran Dreifaltigkeitskirche (Trinity Church), 1701–1717. The city hall was only completed in 1726. The new city trades house (Städtisches Kaufhaus and former old mint) was erected at the city market facing the cathedral. Many more houses were built along the main street in contemporary late baroque style.

But soon, Speyer was again affected by war. The empire demanded contributions to the War of the Spanish Succession (1701–1714). Because of French military exercises in the Landau area Speyer felt compelled to point out its neutrality at the imperial diet 1703. On 17 October, the French under General Tallard laid siege to the fortress of Landau which they had only lost to the empire the year before. A Dutch and imperial Hessian relief force commanded by Count John Ernst and Landgrave Frederick arrived in Speyer on 13 November and set up camp southwest of the city to wait for reinforcement and to continue the following day. The imperials set up headquarters in Speyer and the Dutch near Heiligenstein. Tallard preferred not to wait for the attack but to attack himself. The German side was totally unprepared as the whole leadership was celebrating the emperor's birthday in Speyer. On 15 November, the Germans suffered a devastating defeat in the Battle of Speyerbach. 8000 soldiers died; some of their headstones can still be found in the Allmendwald (forest) between Harthausen and Hanhofen. When Tallard was taken prisoner after the Battle of Blenheim he is said to have been greeted by Landgrave Frederick with the words: Revenge for Speyer!

As of the middle of the century, Speyer had to provide and maintain an army contingent of 20 to 35 men and to the Seven Years' War it had to contribute 17,000 guilders. The four wars of the 18th century cost the city altogether over 100,000 guilders. Speyer was deeply indebted and the population was burdened with high taxes.

Wine trade did not return to Speyer, but the new tobacco trade and manufacture more than made up for it. In 1719, Damian Hugo Philipp von Schönborn became bishop of Speyer. As the residence issue with Speyer still had not been settled, he relocated his base to the farmer village of Bruchsal where he commissioned the construction of Bruchsal Palace.

Impoverishment, high taxation, a stagnating economy and corruption in the urban administration led to unrest among the population and guilds in the years from 1752 to 1754. After long negotiations and concessions, the counsel managed to settle matters.

Reconstruction of the cathedral finally started in the mid-1770s. The western third of the building, with the towers still standing, stood in ruins. The eastern section had been closed off by a wall so it could be used for Mass. The two western towers were taken down and by 1778 the cathedral had a new baroque westwork by Franz Ignaz Michael Neumann and a new interior trim.

== French Revolution and Napoleon ==
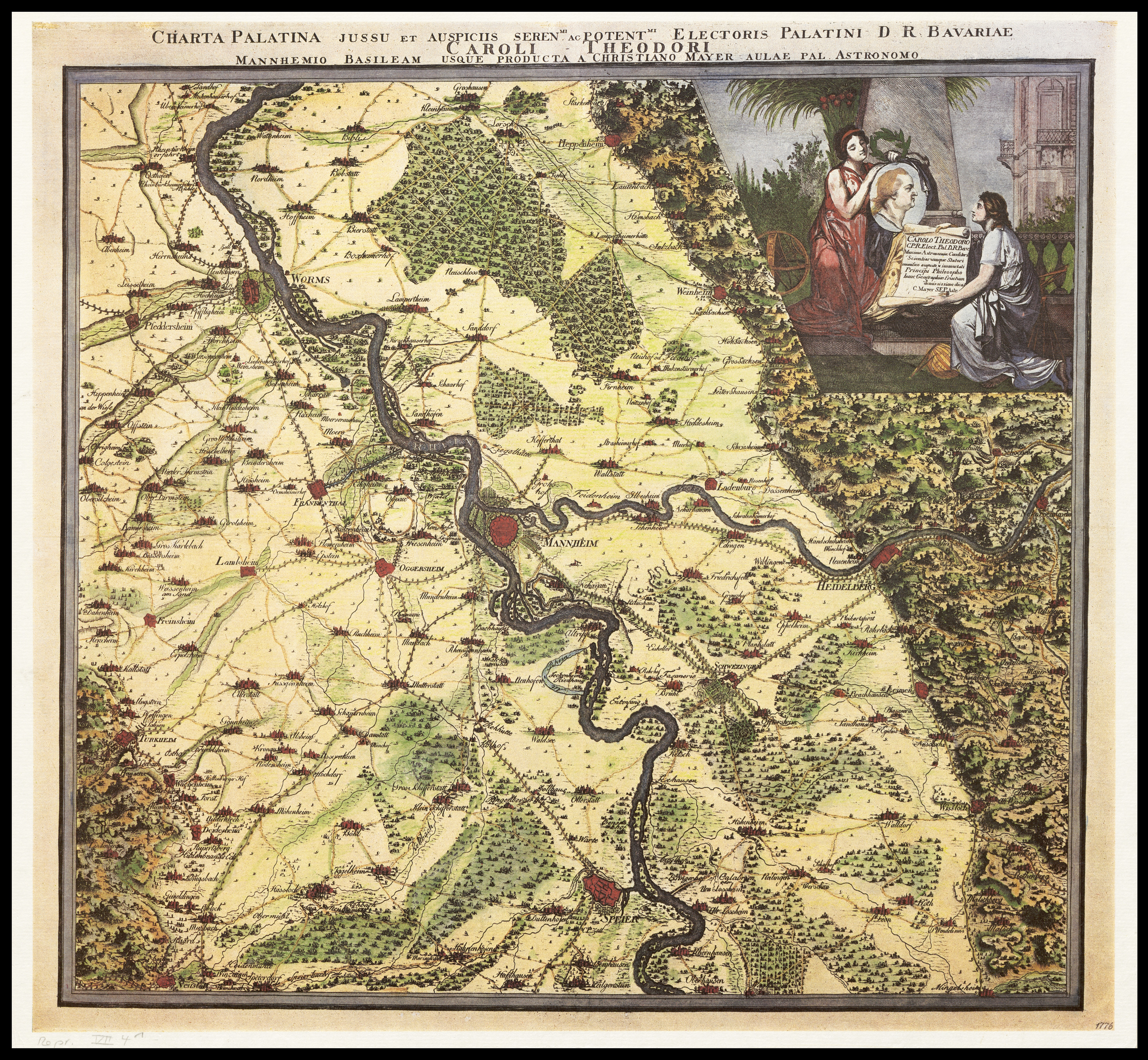
Map of Rhine Plain between Speyer and Worms around 1775

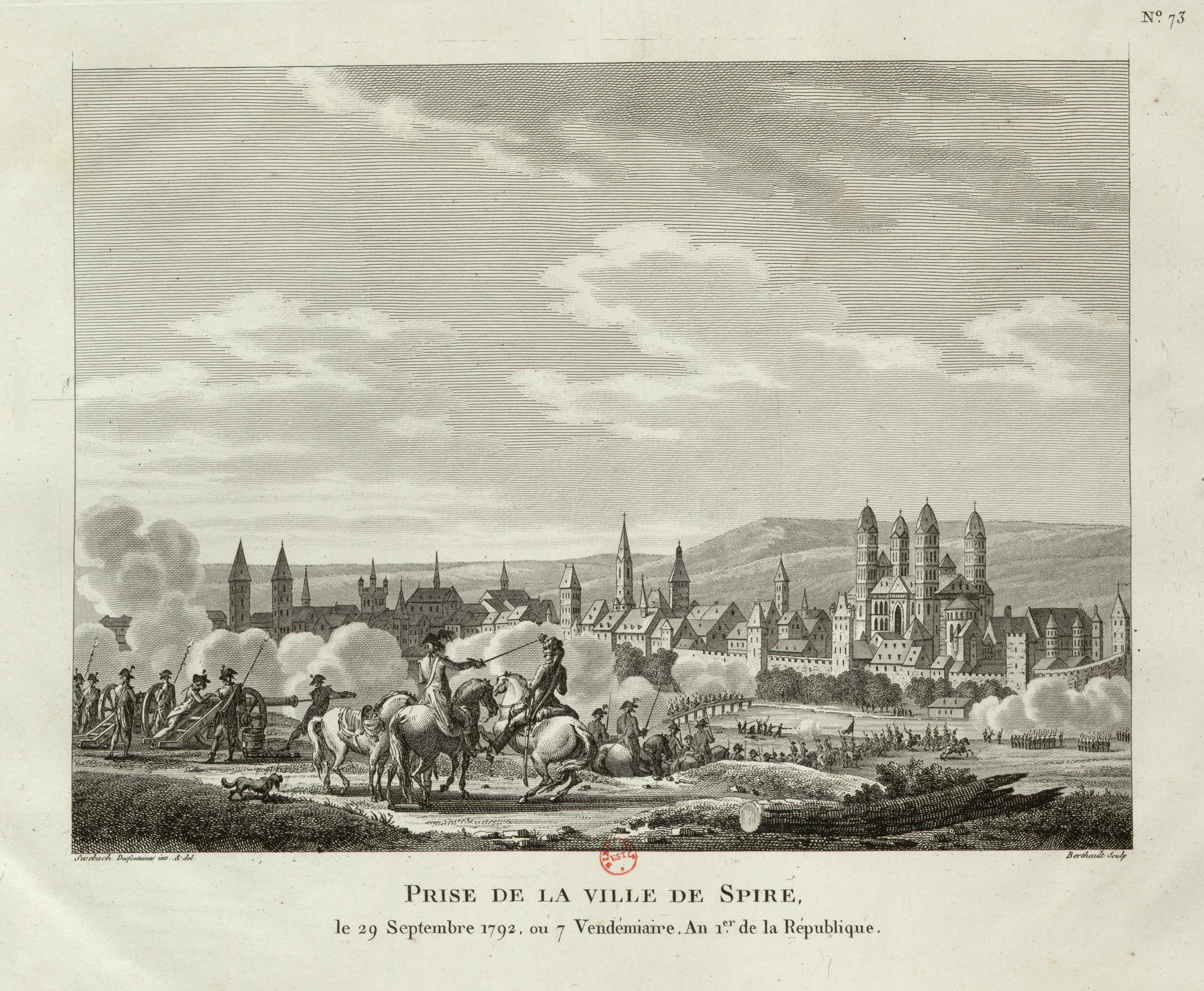
French Revolutionary Army taking Speyer 1792. The cathedral is not correctly depicted with 4 towers.

The French Revolution 1789 heralded the demise of Speyer's imperial history. The city was taken by revolutionary forces coming from the fortress of Landau. Until then, Speyer had been occupied by Austrian troops. The empire managed to retake Speyer several times in the following years but all of Palatinate to the east of the Rhine finally came under French suzerainty on 21 March 1797 until 1814. Speyer became capital of an arrondissement (district) in the new department of Mont-Tonnerre (Donnersberg).

The occupation of Speyer again came with pillaging and damage to the cathedral. But it also came with the achievements of the new French Republic. Feudalism was abolished, estate privileges (manorial system, patrimonial courts) disappeared. A Liberty Pole was put up in the main street, streets and places were given new names, a revolutionary club was founded, and old symbols and coats of arms of the imperial city and the empire were removed. The old criminal law was abolished, gallows and neck weights were eliminated, the guilds were dissolved and the bürgermeister (mayor) became a "maire". The justice of the peace and the city council were elected in the first public election. The citizens as well as the clergy were obliged to swear allegiance to republican values. In the first democratic elections most of the citizens, as in Worms, voted for the old council. The old imperial city constitution was revoked and the imperial city was dissolved. Instead, Speyer received the French municipal constitution. All church possessions were nationalised and, as of 1803, sold.

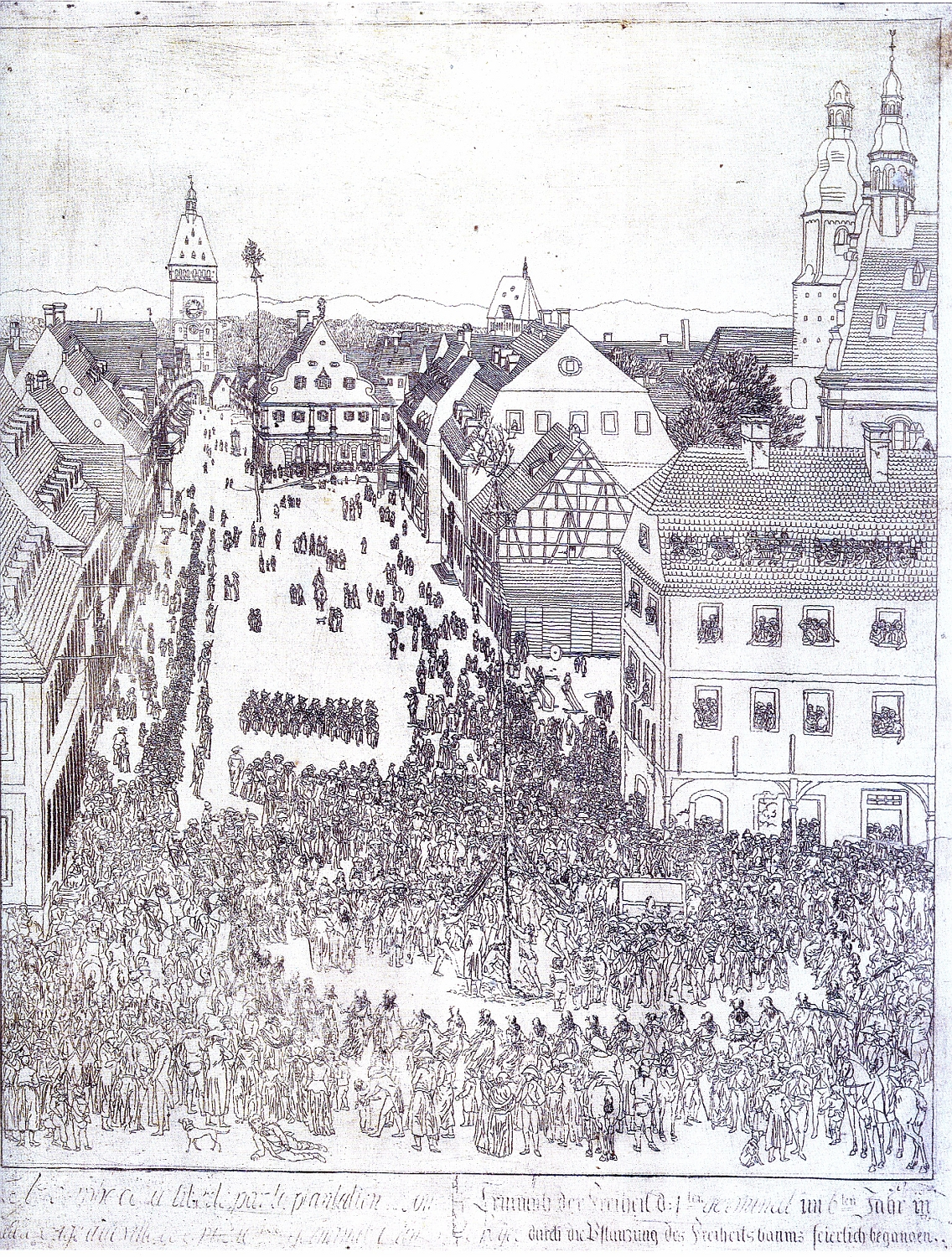
Johannes Ruland (1744–1830): Erection of the Liberty Pole in Speyer

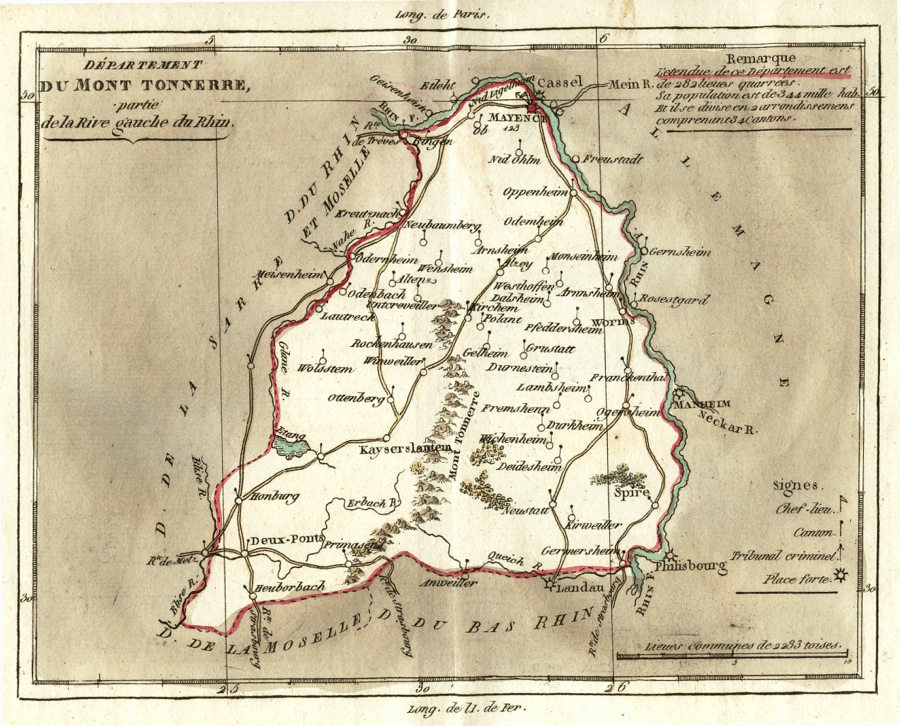
Contemporary map of Mont Tonnerre department

The ascent of Napoleon in France brought changes to Speyer starting at the end of 1799. Democratic elections were replaced by the right to suggest and the justice of the peace was appointed for 10 years. The press was censored and print shops put under control. Permissions were required for associations and meetings and the financial freedom of the Speyer magistrate was restricted. New taxes were introduced, such as octroi, putting a strain on trade, or a tax on doors and windows. On the other hand, the unpopular revolutionary commissioner was abolished and Napoleon introduced reforms which were of importance also for Speyer. The judicial system was standardised and harmonised. The introduction of the Napoleonic Code in 1804 greatly improved legal certainty. Even after the fall of Napoleon and the return of the Palatinate to Germany, the code stayed in place until the introduction of the unified German Civil Code (BGB) in 1900. The judicial system was separated from the administration on all levels. Step by step, Speyer was transformed into an administrative centre. By 1806, there were 3 notary's offices and Speyer had developed a stratum of administrative functionaries.

Although there was little construction in the Napoleonic period, within a few years, Speyer experienced a sharp increase in population. The number of inhabitants rose from 2,805 in 1797 to 5,000 in 1804. By 1815 it had about the same population as in the 16th century. As of 1800, there was also a remarkable birth surplus and there was a shift in the composition of the religions. By 1813, Catholics made up 25% of the population.

In 1806, the bishop of Mainz Joseph Ludwig Colmar saved the cathedral from being demolished by the French who had in mind to transform the westwork into a triumphal arch in honour of Napoleon. The French had been using the cathedral as a cattle shed, barn and storage. They also planned to straighten a number of streets which would have changed the character of the city considerably. Yet, due to the timely end of the Napoleonic era, these plans never came to fruition. Only the Wormser Heeresstrasse, today Wormser Landstrasse, was somewhat straightened out for which the ruins of the Holy Sepulchre Church were removed. That same year, the bishop's palace to the north of the cathedral was demolished as well as the cloister and St. Catherine's Chapel on the southern side in 1822. Since then, the cathedral has been detached and free-standing.

The demise of French reign started in 1813 with the defeat of Napoleon in the Battle of Leipzig. The coalition armies conquered the Rhine crossing at Mannheim on 31 December 1813 and pursued the French fleeing toward Kaiserslautern. That same day, the French retreated from Speyer leaving hundreds of typhoid patients behind in the Speyer field hospital which had been used by Napoleon's retreating army. In the following weeks it was used for the wounded of the coalition army which came through Speyer. After Napoleon returned from Elba, Speyer again was a military back area in the wars of 1815. Once again it stood in the international limelight when, on 27 June 1815, Tsar Alexander I of Russia, Emperor Francis I of Austria and King Frederick William III of Prussia met at the allied headquarters in Speyer.

The reorganisation of the European states at the Congress of Vienna in 1815 also brought territorial changes for the Palatinate region and Speyer. Reading a memorandum written by 50 notables from the city and district of Speyer for the allies, it is apparent that Speyer also considered the blessings of the French occupation. The notables expressed that "the most sacred principles" of the social contract, on which the previous constitution of the land has been based would also determine the future relationships: national representation, equal rights for all, freedom of conscience and freedom of the press, equal taxation, independent judicial system, public trials, jury trials and personal security. These institutions have been the basis of the constitution under which they have lived for long, under which a new generation has grown and it was in the spirit of these principles that the youth of this land has been raised. Thereby, the signatories unambiguously signalled that they were not willing to return to the conditions before the French revolution.

== 19th century: citizens and civil servants ==
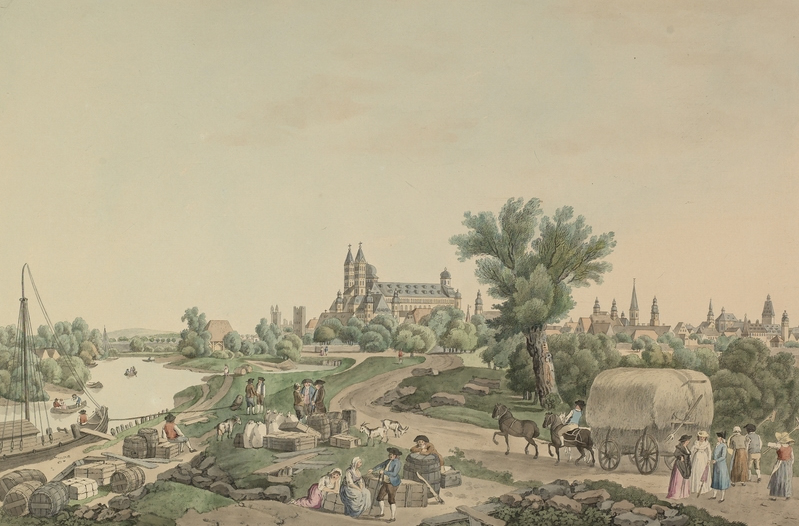
View of Speyer in 1798

In 1816 Speyer became capital of the district of the Palatinate. The area had been given to the Kingdom of Bavaria after the Congress of Vienna as compensation for Salzburg, which had been ceded to Austria. It was only on January 1, 1838, that the name "Pfalz" (Palatinate) was officially introduced for the area. Other candidates for the capital were Zweibrücken, Kaiserslautern and Frankenthal. At the time, Speyer had a population of 6,000 and offered the best conditions because of its location and already existing buildings. Because of its previous function it also had an already existing administrative apparatus to build upon. The government was posted in the city hall. There were only minor changes in the French administrative system. This not only had advantages but also left the restrictions on the city magistrate in place: the mayor, city council, assistants and police commissioner were not appointed by the first consul but by the Bavarian district commissioner, the district government and the king. The council decisions still required the approval of the supervisory bodies. First local elections only took place in 1818 and 1837 but suffrage was very restricted: in 1819 there were 270 eligible voters, in 1829 only 214, in 1838 518. In 1843, Speyer had 10,000 inhabitants but only 534 eligible voters and in 1848 there were 360.

Speyer became headquarters of the Palatine postal system, the administration of the salt monopoly, the chief customs office, the district office for the northeastern Palatinate and headquarters for the district constabulary. But the district court was placed in Frankenthal and the top military administration in Landau. Speyer again became a garrison but with constantly changing units. Post headquarters were established in 1844.

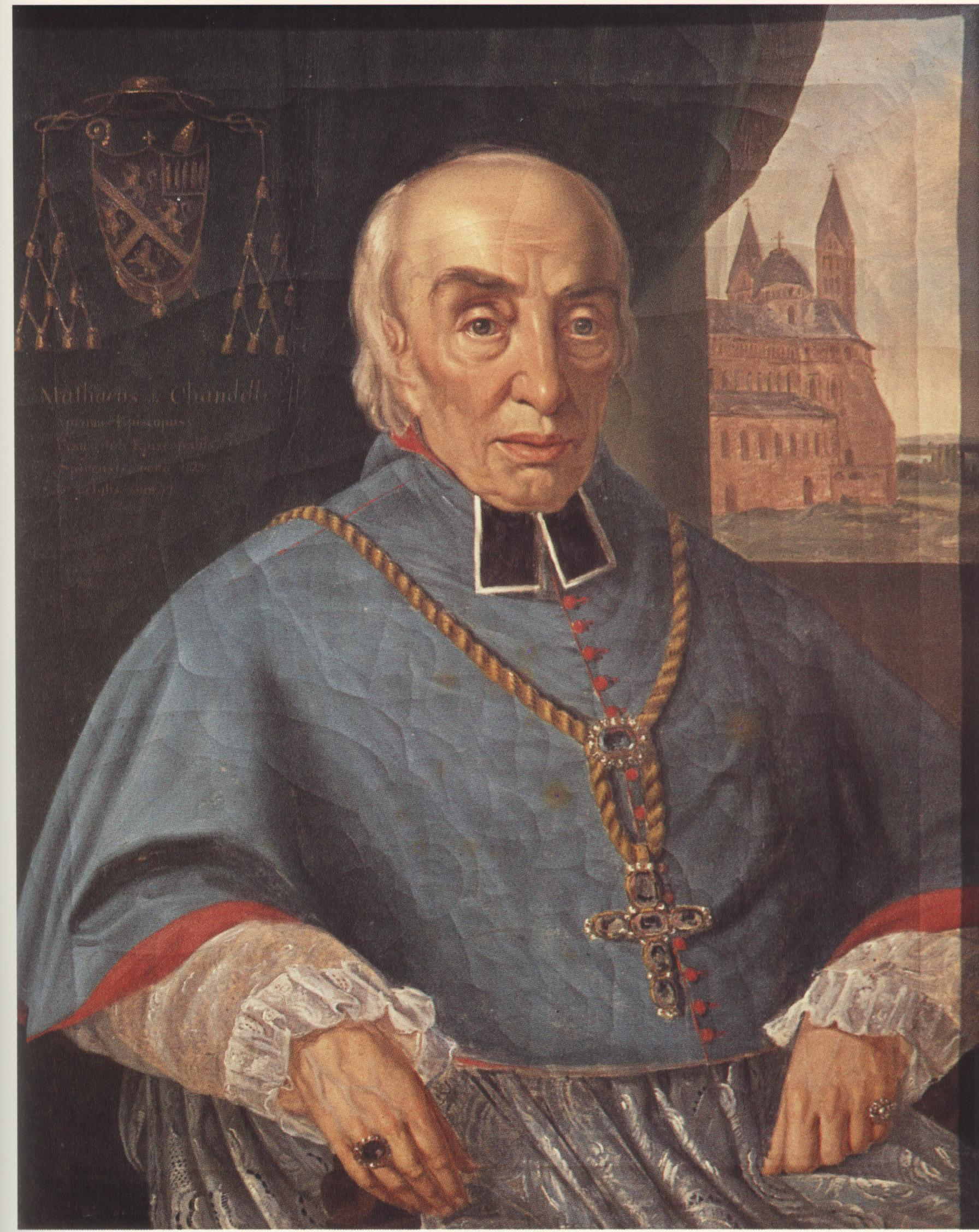
Bishop Matthew George von Chandelle

In 1816, the Protestant consistory responsible for the Bavarian Rhine District was established in Speyer and in 1818 the reformed and Protestant churches united. The Catholic Church also reorganised its territories according to the concordat with Bavaria in 1817 and Speyer became a suffragan diocese of the diocese of Bamberg with its first bishop, Matthew George von Chandelle. In mainly Protestant Speyer, this was met with mistrust by the city council and it felt disposed to point out problems of the past to the Bavarian government and to request that property and freedom of conscience for the Protestants remain untouched. The Catholics remained cautious, e. g. the Corpus Christi procession was held inside the cathedral. Even after 1833, the procession still took place only within the cathedral gardens. In 1827, a new seminary for priests opened in Speyer.

On 1 January 1838, the name of the Rhine District was officially changed to Palatinate (Pfalz).

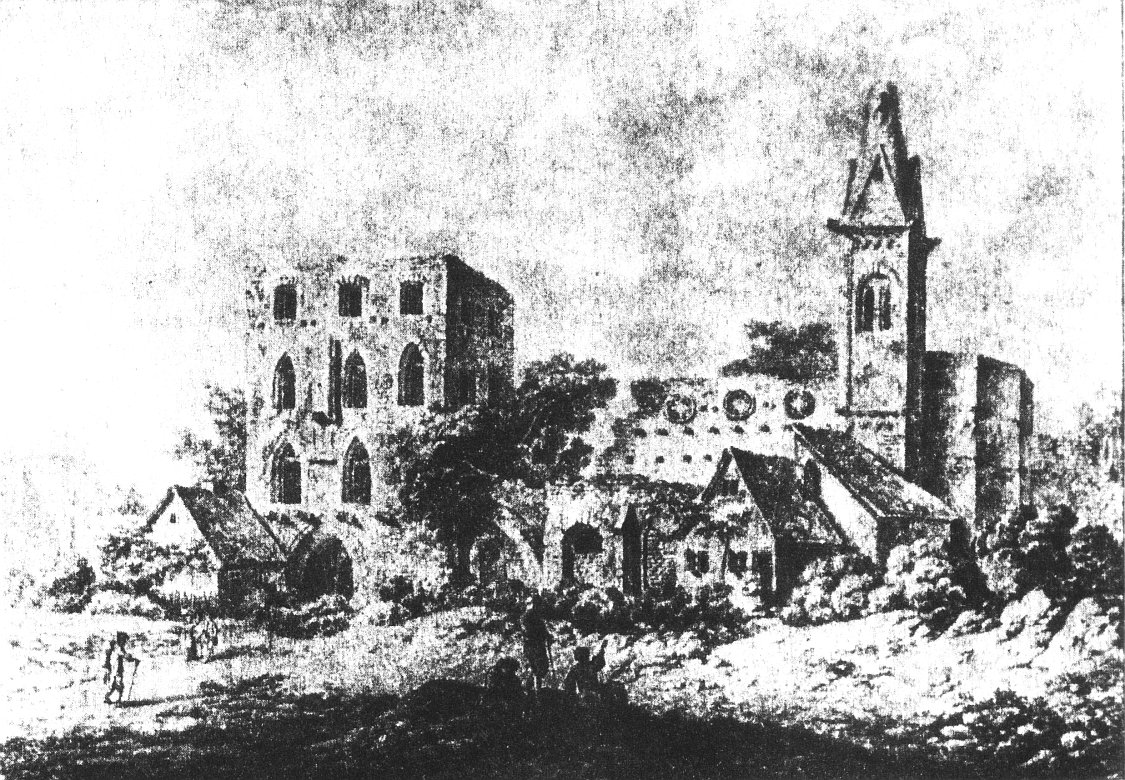
The ruins of the Domstaffel tower and the Nikolaus chapel to the north of the cathedral were removed.

By the end of the French occupation, Speyer was far from rebuilt. Many of the larger buildings still lay in ruins and the cathedral was in a state of deterioration. Although larger sections of the city wall were still intact, after 1792 they lost their defensive purpose. Within the walls there were still large tracts of undeveloped land that were mostly used as garden plots. The Gilgen and Hasenpfuhl suburbs were even less sparsely settled and the secularised monastery of St. Magdalen stood totally detached from the urban area. Its church served the only Catholic parish in Speyer.

In March 1818, King Ludwig I ordered the restoration of the cathedral. In this context, the ruins of the cloister and the derelict rectory were stripped. In 1822, the first Mass was held since 1792. The demolition material was used to erect a new barracks where the present-day museum is located. Part of the barracks were the neighbouring buildings of the Teutonic Order and the Mirbach house as well as the former Jesuit college including the former church which was used as a riding stable.

The growth in administrative importance brought numerous authorities and thus people into the plagued town which had suffered from depopulation during the occupations. In the first half of the 19th century the population doubled. A number of construction projects brought business and prosperity and the first residential quarters appeared outside the ancient town walls. The Rhine harbour was extended by 1837 and by 1847 Speyer had been linked to the railway network. There were social and charitable institutions such as work and educational institutions for girls, a charity club for the Jewish community and a hospital. Regarding education, the town had numerous educational institutions making it the best-structured school system in the Palatinate.

The people of the Palatinate became disgruntled with the Bavarian government in Munich because, as of 1819, their goods were subject to duties. As a result, in the discussion about the future of Germany, the Palatinate increasingly sided with the unionists. The association for the abolition of duties in Germany, founded that year by Friedrich List, found great favour.

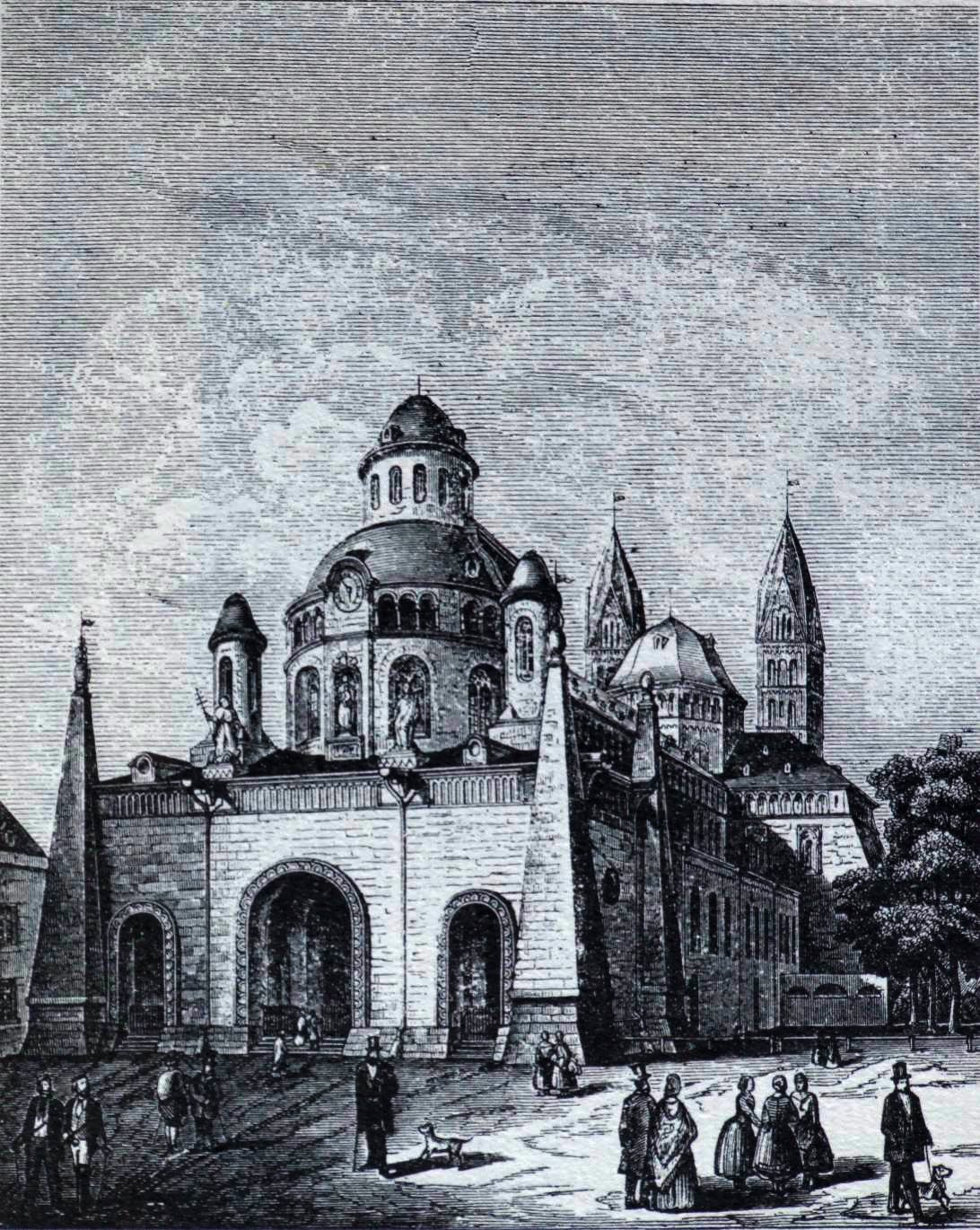
Speyer Cathedral 1830

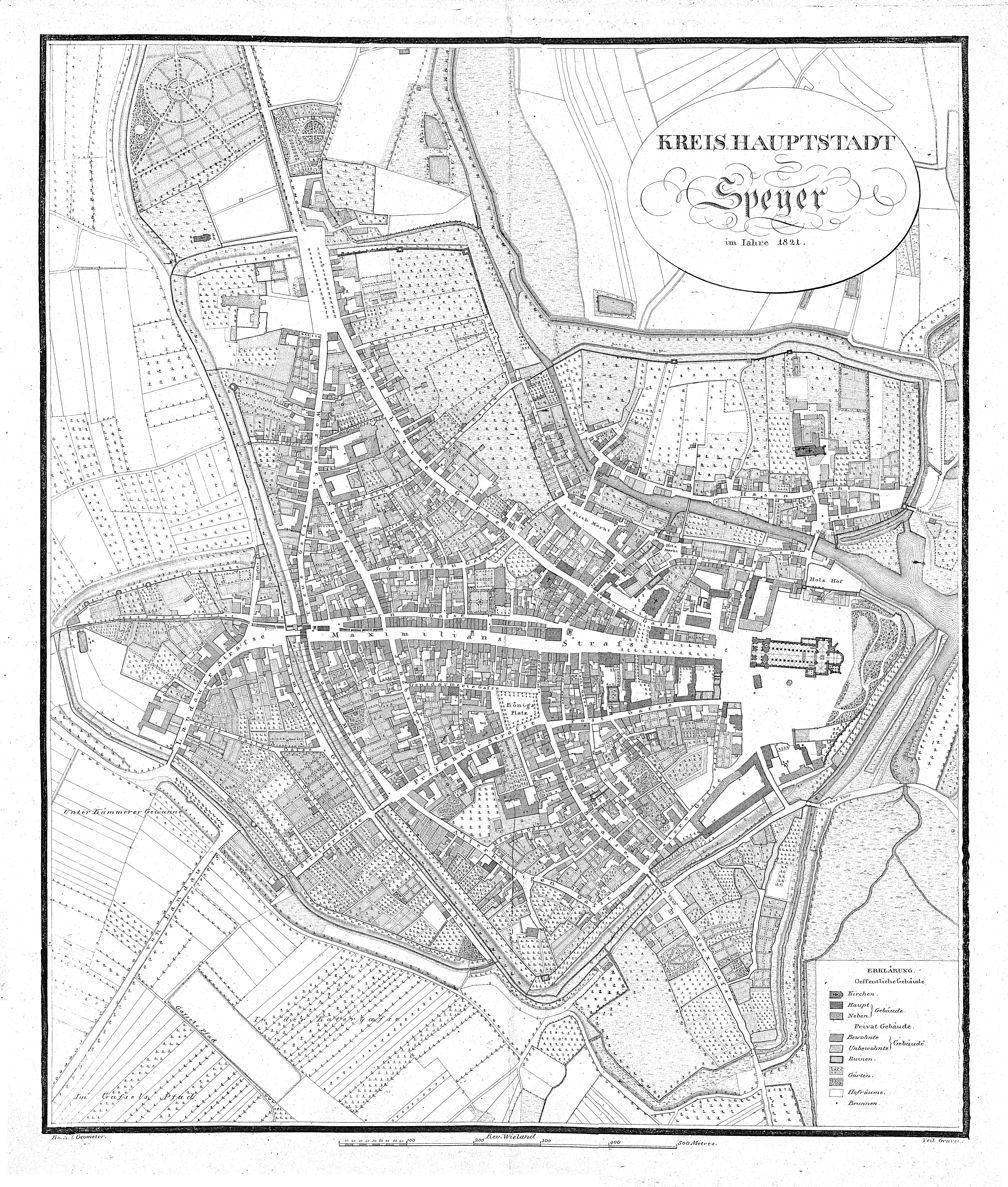
District Capital Speyer 1821

In 1817 and 1825, Bavaria and Baden signed treaties on the straightening of the Rhine. Initial plans were designed to move the river away from Speyer which led the city to lodge a protest with the Bavarian government in 1826. As a result, the characteristic bend of the Rhine at Speyer remained. But, in 1820, Speyer was unable to prevent that the redoubt on the Rhine opposite Mannheim could be used as a harbour which it feared would be to its disadvantage. This was to be the root of the city of Ludwigshafen. As of 1830, Speyer commissioned the upgrading of its own harbour at the mouth of the Speyerbach.

Speyer would have preferred a main railway line from Basel to Mainz on its side of the Rhine which was also favoured by the French in 1829. Bavaria was not interested and it was built on the opposite side instead. Speyer was even more disappointed when the east–west railway from Saarbrücken to Mannheim only passed nearby Schifferstadt. In 1838 Speyer still expected to be the eastern terminal of that connection and was even prepared to pay for the longer way around. Instead, Speyer was connected to Schifferstadt by a side line which was ceremoniously opened on 11 June 1847. The station was not built at the Rhine gate, preferred by the city, but outside Speyer to the northwest, where it still stands today.

In the first half of the 19th century, the larger part of the urban population was poor and the city needed to take measures for its support. One of them was a distinctive system of commons for the many green plots in the city. After the July Revolution 1830 in nearby France, Speyer put up amelioration schemes. In 1845 it bought large quantities of potatoes to sell them at lower prices, in 1846, bread was subsidised for the poor and in 1847, farmers were given free seed potatoes. Disapproved by the rich, these measures were also meant to appease the masses in these revolutionary times.

Speyer had educational institutions of every kind giving it the most sophisticated education system in the Palatinate. Compulsory education was introduced in 1817, although a fee was levied. Until 1821, the old orphanage on Ludwigstrasse was used as a school for 4 Protestant and 2 Catholic classes totalling 700 pupils and 6 teachers. In 1821, the city built a new school with 12 rooms on the compound of the former imperial chamber court. Another school for 200 girls opened in the Monastery of St. Magdalena, anathema to the city council which still had a Protestant majority. Thus, financial support by the city was disputed until 1838.

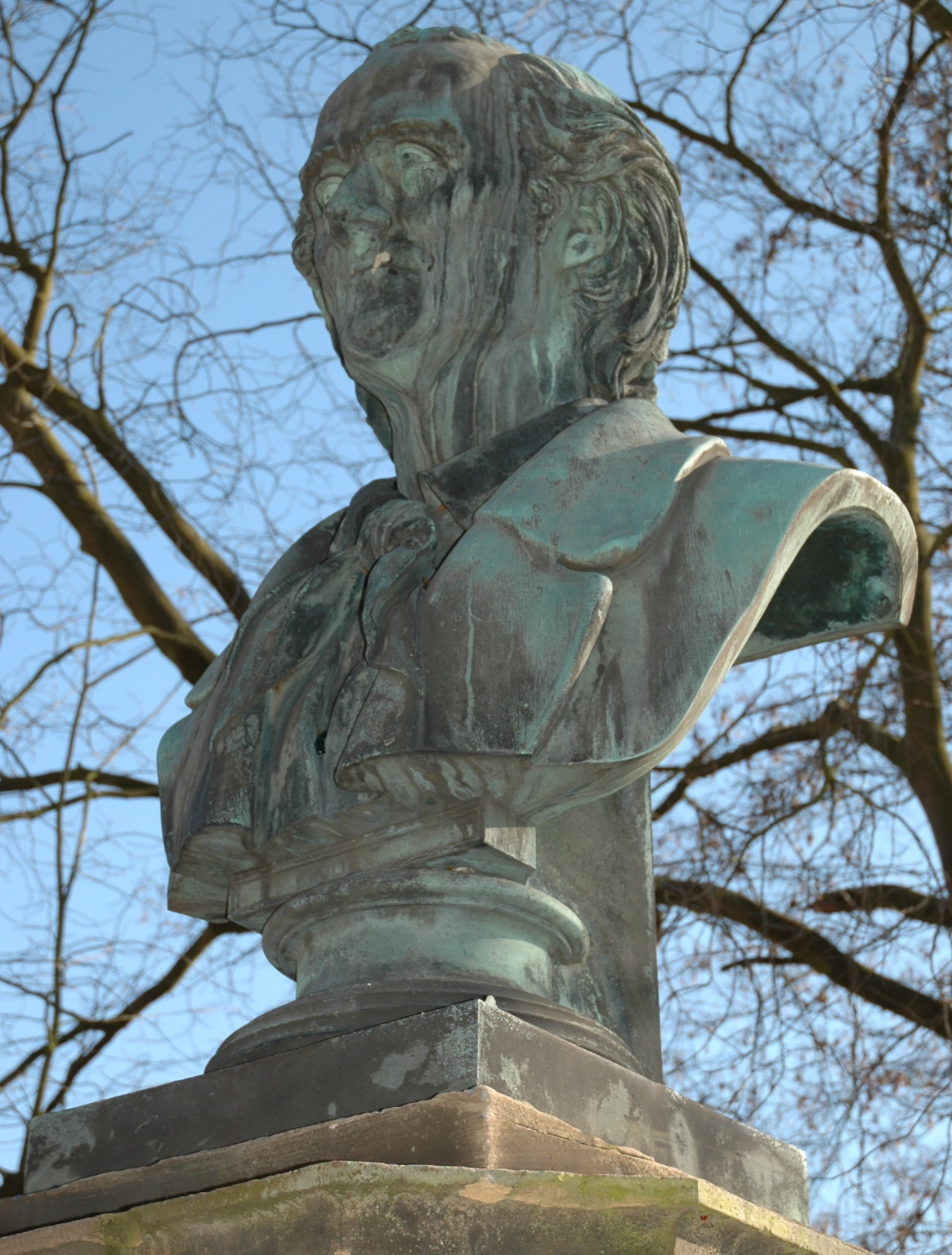
Bust of Friedrich Magnus Schwerd in the Cathedral Garden

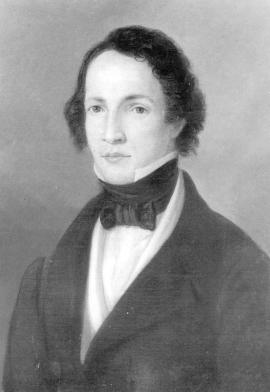
Johann Kaspar Zeuss

In 1817, a progymnasium, a gymnasium and a lyceum, the only one in the Palatinate, as a pre-stage for university. They were all housed in the so-called Fürstenhaus (Princes' House) on Postgasse. Renowned professors were Ludwig Feuerbach, Friedrich Magnus Schwerd and Johann Kaspar Zeuss. The lyceum library with 9,000 volumes was the largest in the Palatinate. In 1839, the seminary for priests was expanded by an episcopal boarding house which led to a substantial increase of Catholic students in the gymnasium. Therefore, as of 1855, at the insistence of the bishop, history classes had to be separated along denominational lines. Present-day Hans-Purrmann-Gymnasium has its roots in a girls' school that was established in 1841.

In these years, the first associations were formed: the Harmony Association (1816), the Music Club (1818, as of 1829 Cecilia Club), the re-established Shooting Club (1820) which already existed in 1529, the Gymnastic Club (1846/1848 despite resistance from by the district government), and the Sing Club (1847). In 1820, 2 sites for swimming were set up, one a little upstream on the banks of Rhine and one on the Woogbach to the west of the Worms gate. The first bathing ship was built in 1821.

Apart from the modern legal system introduced by the French, the Palatinate population had become accustomed to more liberal attitudes than their German compatriots to the east of the Rhine. In the first decades of Bavarian rule, the Palatinate administration was predominantly made up of local people of liberal disposition. As of 1830, the posts were more and more filled with staff from Bavaria that was raised in a conservative spirit. This more and more led to tensions with the Bavarian king and government. The initially liberal-minded king failed in reinstating press censorship, which he himself had abolished just shortly before. Thus, the liberal and democratic trends of the ‘Vormärz’ (pre-March, 1848) turned Speyer into a supra-regional centre for newspapers and the press with such renowned publications as the “Speyerer Anzeigeblatt” and the “Neue Speyerer Zeitung” (NSZ), an important voice in the Vormärz years. The printer Jakob Christian Kolb already had a licence from the French in 1802 for the Gazette de Spire, which already in those days had troubles because of censorship. As of 1814, Kolb and later his son Georg Friedrich Kolb published the "Speyer Zeitung" (as of 1816 "Neue Speyerer Zeitung"). Under the revision of Johann Friedrich Butenschoen the NSZ adopted a decidedly progressive standpoint. With its liberal and democratic attitudes it continuously ran into trouble with the Bavarian government. Friedrich von Gentz, a close associate of Klemens von Metternich considered the NSZ to be most impertinent newspaper in Germany. The Bavarian government also was of the opinion that the NSZ "distinguished itself among the German newspapers by the most evil spirit and the most indecent tone" and threatened to shut it down completely. After the July Revolution 1830 in France the Bavarian government called on the Palatinate district government for increased vigilance and explicitly alluded to the danger of the NSZ. On 28 February 1831, Ludwig I decreed all political writings to be censored, but in light of public pressure and liberal parliamentary opposition he retracted in June that same year. Yet, the pressure on the liberal press was not off and it was subject to increased confiscations, postal surveillance and arrests. After the nearby Hambach Festival in 1832, the NSZ became a motor of the liberal movement in the Palatinate and lent an important voice against the conservative backlash starting in 1838. That same year, Georg Friedrich Kolb was elected to the Speyer council where he advocated the construction of railroads and commerce.

Renowned sons of Speyer at this time included the artist Anselm Feuerbach (*1829), the poet Martin Greif (*1839) and the artist Hans Purrmann (*1880).

=== The Revolution of 1848/49 ===
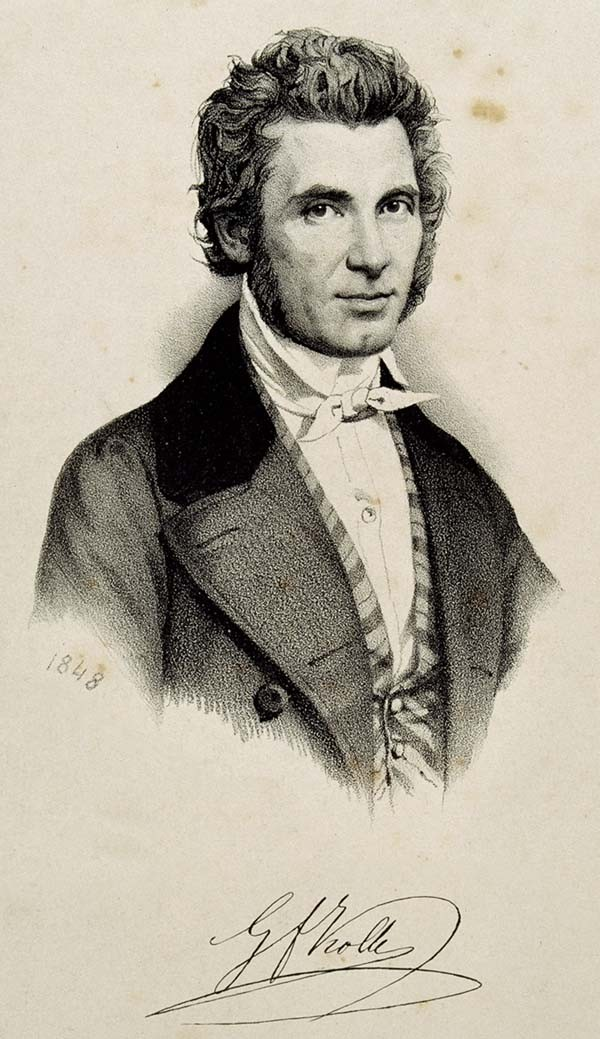
Georg Friedrich Kolb

On 28 February 1848, the NSZ reported on the events of a renewed revolution in Paris. On 3 March, the paper listed the political wishes of the Palatines: inter alia freedom of the press, arming of the people, revision of the constitution, free local administrations, amnesty for political offenses. On 7 March 1848, several hundred citizens assembled in front of the city hall, assented to an address to the King of Bavaria and selected deputies for the delivery of the petition. In mid-April, a people's association was established to steer the elections; more than 200 inhabitants of Speyer joined spontaneously. In the following months, apart from a few minor incidents, the situation remained calm. That year, the people's association was the decisive force in the city, organising festivities and events that remained peaceful. One example was a march from the cathedral to the cemetery in commemoration of the revolutionary Robert Blum who was executed on 9 November 1848 in Vienna. 21 January 1849 saw the solemn proclamation of basic and civic rights.

With a great majority, Georg Friedrich Kolb was elected on 1 May 1848 as a deputy for the riding of Speyer-Germersheim to the first National Assembly in Frankfurt. In the following months, Kolb was also elected mayor of Speyer and deputy in the Bavarian parliament for the riding of Speyer-Frankenthal. Bavaria rejected the new constitution worked out by the national assembly. On 28 April 1849, the Speyer city council supported a demand by the people's association for the Bavarian parliament to convene in order to put pressure on King Maximilian II. On the very same day, Frederick William IV of Prussia rejected the crown offered to him by the national assembly in Frankfurt.

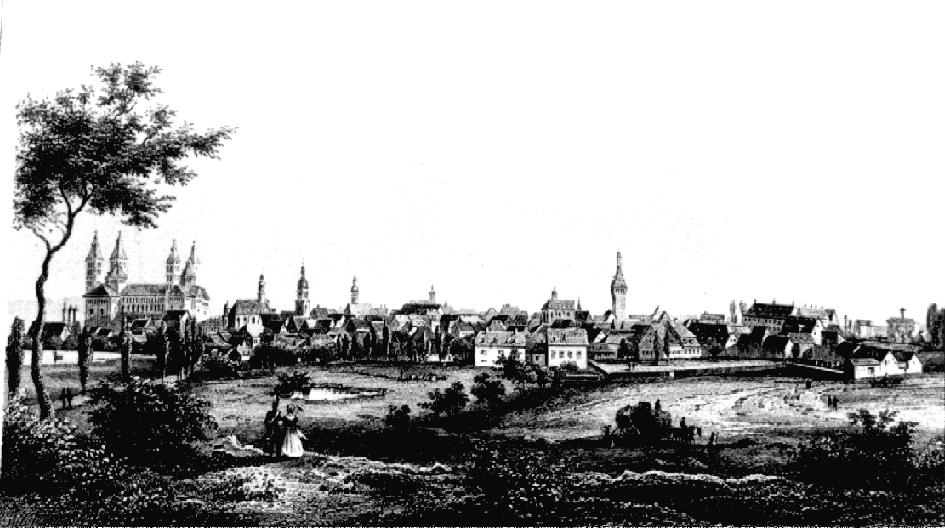
Speyer in 1855 seen from the north

As of 2 May 1849, a provisional revolutionary government was formed in Kaiserslautern; it declared allegiance to the new constitution and secession of the Palatinate from Bavaria. Mayor Kolb addressed the people from the balcony of the city hall and administered an oath to the constitution. The following day, the citizens put up barricades to prevent Prussian troops from marching through in order to strengthen the garrison in Landau. On 21 May, for a few days, the revolutionary government moved to Speyer where it sacked several civil servants of the district government which did not recognise the new constitution. The black-red-golden flag of the revolution was flown from the cathedral and Friedrich Hilgard was appointed as new commissioner for the Palatinate. Hilgard confiscated all available public funds, sacked further servants loyal to the old government and levied a compulsory loan. Members of the old Palatinate government that hadn't left town were arrested. In the beginning of June, Kolb tried to cool the revolutionary fervour at which the provisional government dissolved the city council. Yet, in the local elections on 9 June almost the same council was put back in place. This was the first local election in Speyer in which all male citizens of full age were allowed to vote. On 13 June, Prussian troops invaded the Palatinate; Speyer was occupied on 16 June without resistance. As agreed, Bavarian troops took over on 21 June imposing martial law on the rebellious province. The Palatine uprising was put down and the old government was re-installed. Any revolutionary activities were considered as high treason. The NSZ was prohibited, Kolb was imprisoned in Zweibrücken until January 1850 and censorship was tightened considerably.

After the Revolution of 1848 had been crushed many of its proponents fled the country and many others preferred to emigrate. With a civil administration force dependent on Bavaria the restoration and petty bourgeois mentality had quite a level playing field in Speyer. The liberal Speyer papers soon perished and Kolb left Speyer. In Munich, the Palatinate was considered to be defiant and the reins were held very tightly, to be somewhat loosened only towards the end of the century.

=== Urban and economical development until 1900 ===
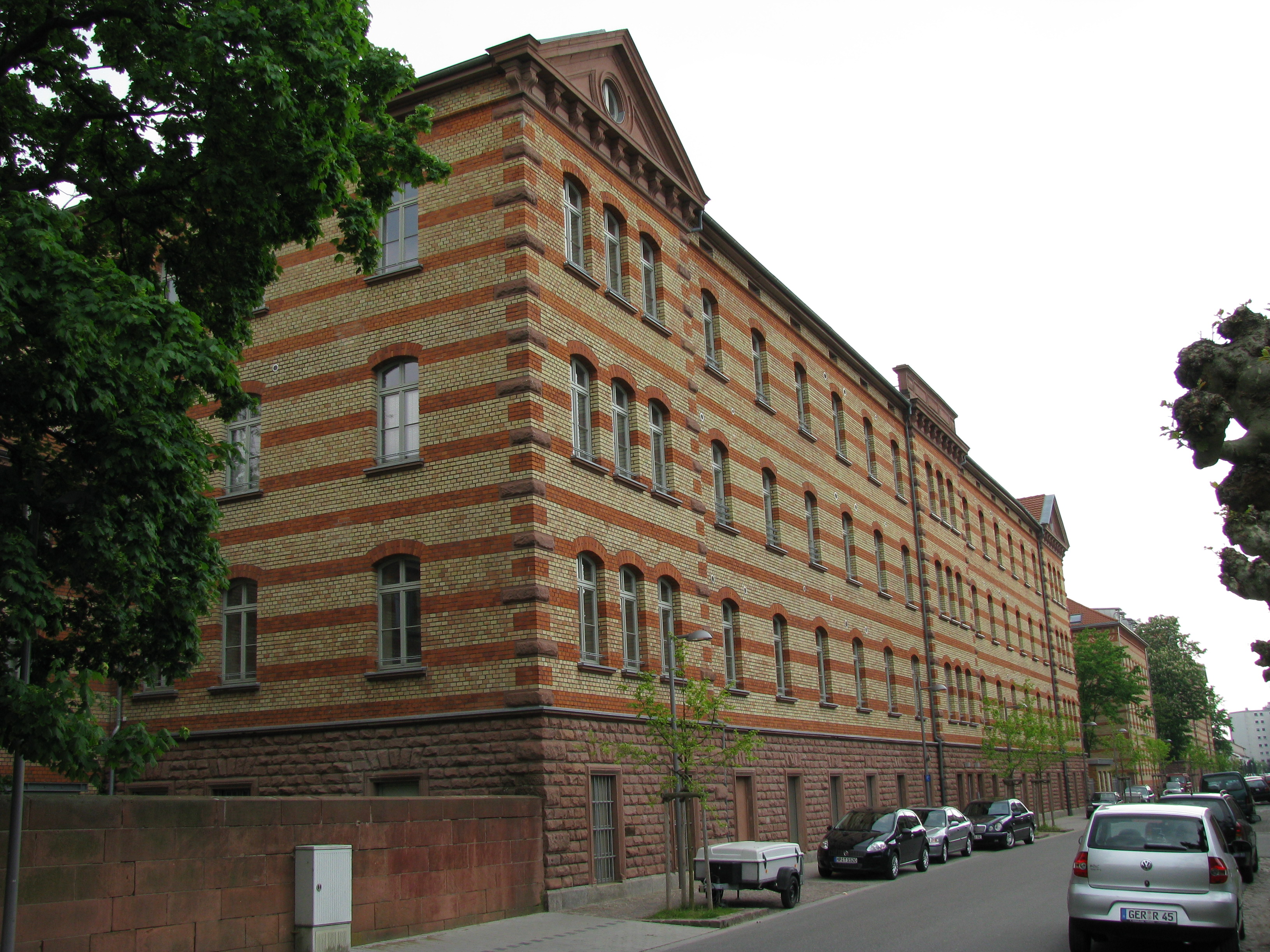
New barracks

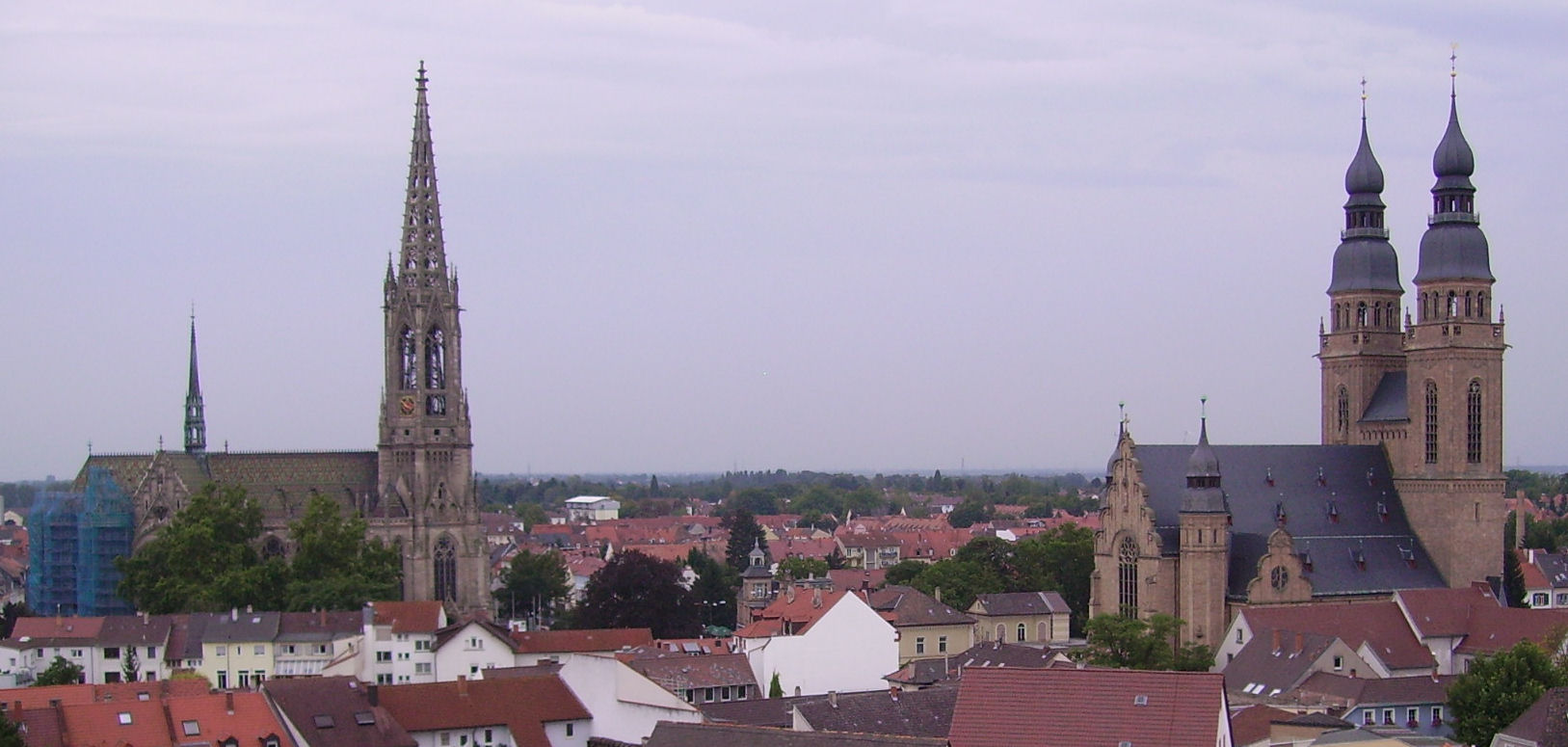
links: Memorial Church (Gedächtniskirche), to the right: Church St. Joseph

From 1839 to 1841, the moat Hirschgraben in the north of the city was filled in and the amalgamated Catholic and Protestant cemeteries were created to the north of it (today Konrad Adenauer Park). Construction of the train station was started on the western side of the cemetery in 1846. Other big construction projects were the Rhine harbour, built from 1853 to 1856 and restoration of the cathedral from 1854 to 1858. By the end of 1849, Speyer had a population of 10,410. Increasing emigration, economical crisis and inflation in the middle of the century slowed population growth. By 1867, Speyer had 12,728 inhabitants; in addition, around 1,900 soldiers were stationed there. As of 1859, Speyer lost its rank as largest city in the Palatinate to Kaiserslautern. Migration from the surrounding countryside steadily increased the share of the Catholic population from 41.1% in 1849 to 46.7% in 1867. Yet, growth remained within the city walls where empty areas had not quite been filled.

In 1852, at the instigation of Bishop Nicolaus von Weis, the Institution of Poor School Nuns was established within the St. Magdalen monastery. A typhoid epidemic in 1854/55 was the background for the founding of the Palatine Deaconess motherhouse in Speyer. In the beginning, it was placed in the former reformed school house next to the Holy Spirit Church; later it was moved to a building by the church tower of St. George.

As of 1857, there were plans to build a Protestant memorial church in commemoration of the Reformation. It was believed that the protestation took place in a building called Retscher, of which the ruins still exist on the back side of St. George Church. Therefore, money was collected in the whole country and many donations also came from abroad. The Memorial Church was finally built 1893 to 1904, not in place of the Retscher but outside of the old city in front of the former Gilgen gate.

From 1854 to 1856, the baroque westwork of the cathedral was dismantled and replaced by a westwork in the original Romanesque style including the two former western towers. Pre-Christian Roman headstones that were unearthed during the works were brought to the museum.

On 29 November 1860, the first gas lighting was put into operation. In 1864, the rail line from Schifferstadt to Speyer was expanded to Germersheim. In 1865, the old Augustine monastery between Wormser Strasse and Johannesstrasse was replaced by a large school building. That same year, a floating bridge was installed on the Rhine.

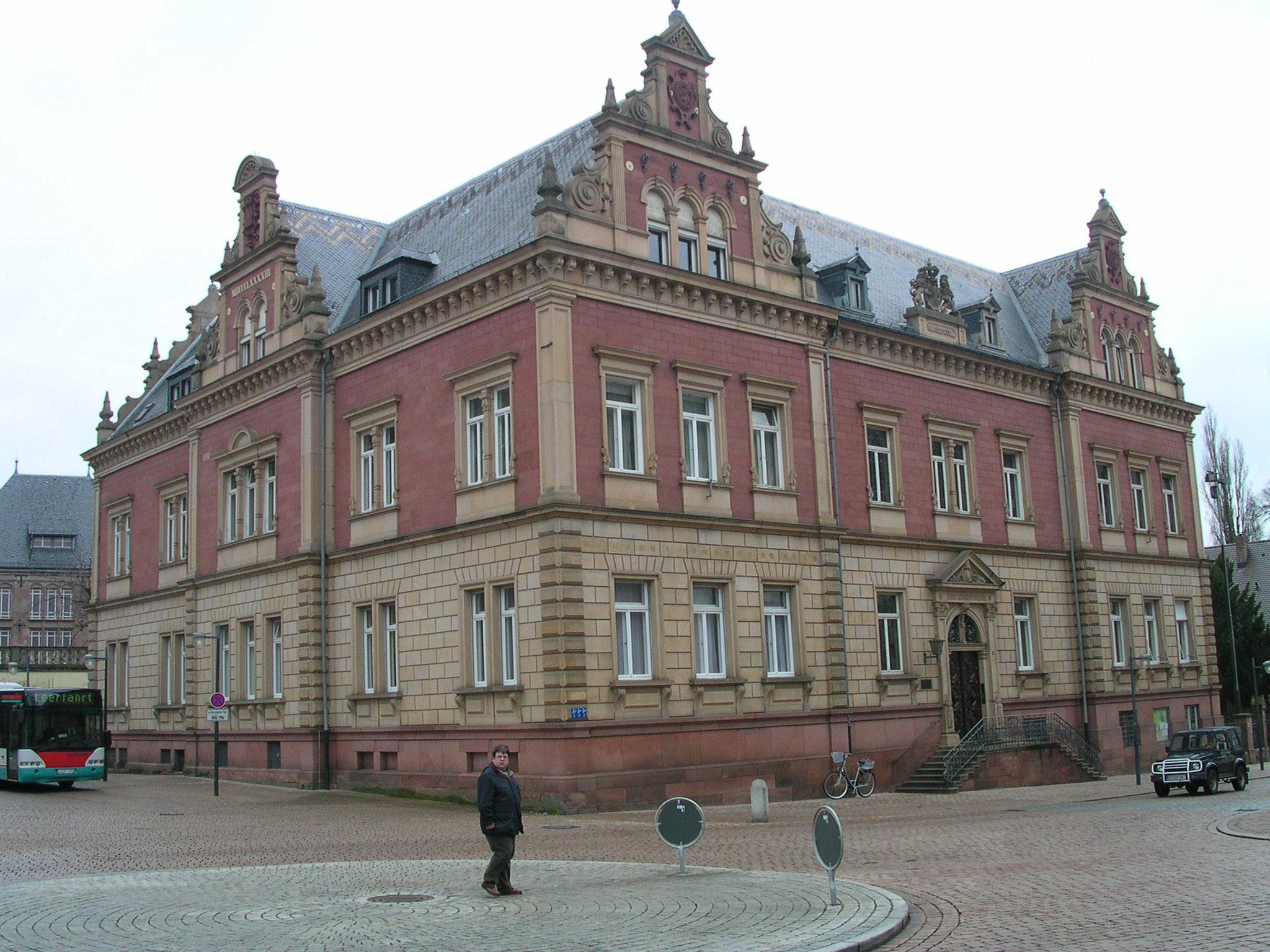
Protestant Consistory

Around the middle of the century there was a marked change in the economy of Speyer. In 1833, around half of the population still lived off the land. By 1861, this share had declined to 30% and in 1895 only 8.6% remained. A cooperative credit union for the promotion of commerce and trade was founded in 1864 from which emerged the Volksbank that still exists today.

After the creation of the North German Confederation and the southern German states successively falling into line by 1868 the citizens of Speyer elected their deputies for the parliament of the Zollverein. Yet, they were not convinced of the lesser German solution as most could not imagine a Germany without Austria. This attitude only changed after the outbreak of the Franco-Prussian War in 1870. Speyer's proximity to the French border made it a transit point for troops and the wounded which put a heavy burden on city finances because of quartering, hospital expenses, supplies and harness services.

By 1871, Speyer's population had risen to 13,227. In 1873 a railway connection across the Rhine to Schwetzingen was inaugurated. The train crossed the river on the floating bridge. The brewing business was of major importance for Speyer and around 1890 there were 20 breweries in the city producing 25 million litres of beer per year.

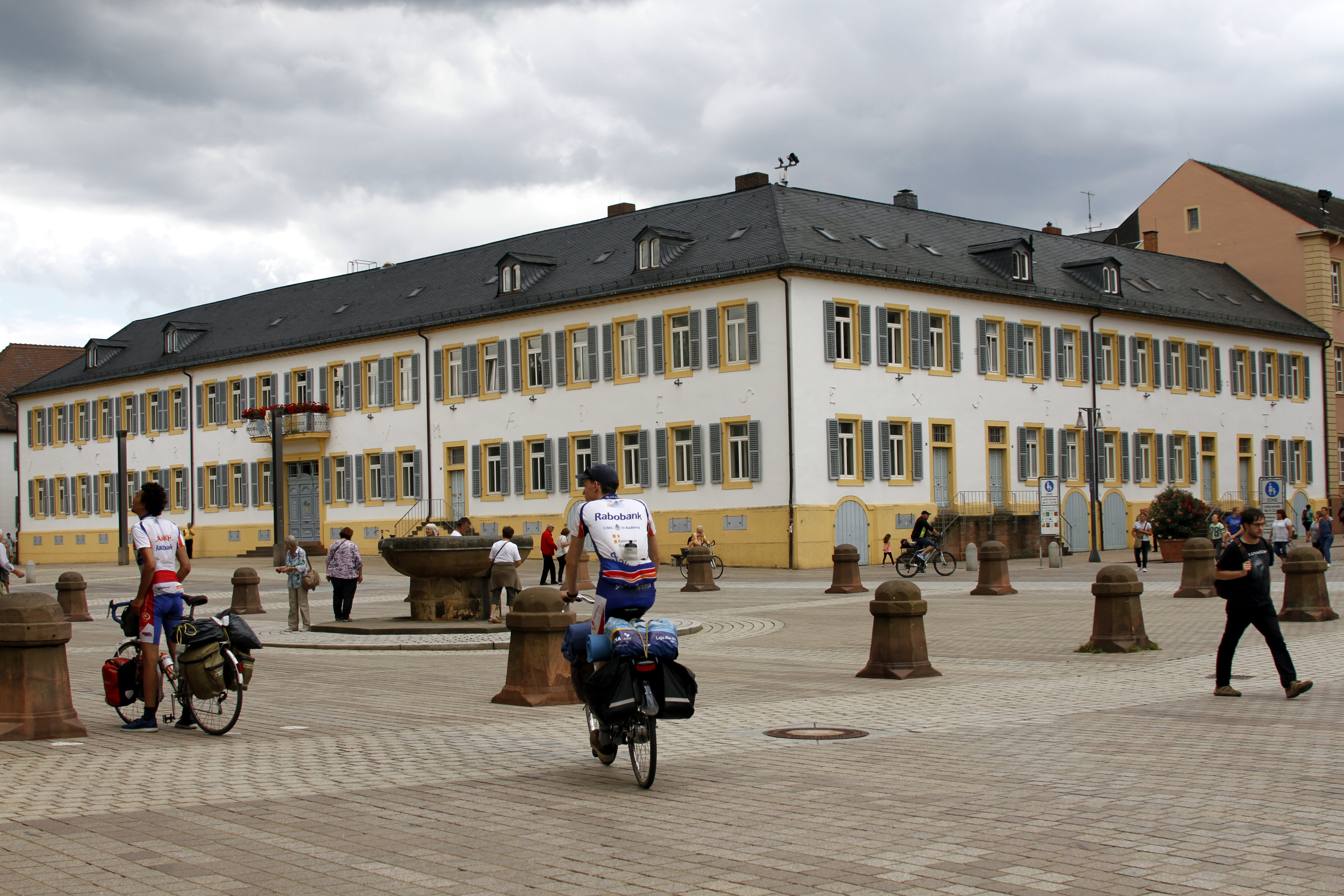
Episcopal residence

As far as employment was concerned, the cigar industry was even more important. Speyer was centre of a large tobacco growing region and there were numerous trading firms and factories. Cigars were also produced at home. A third important sector in Speyer was brick production. In 1889, the cotton spinning company was founded; its former building is protected and still stands. Other important factories in this era were a factory for bootlegs (later shoe factory Salamander), the cement and asphalt factory and the celluloid works. Working conditions in many cases were inhuman and degrading and pay was poor. Around the end of the century there were many strikes which continued until World War I.

== The 20th century ==
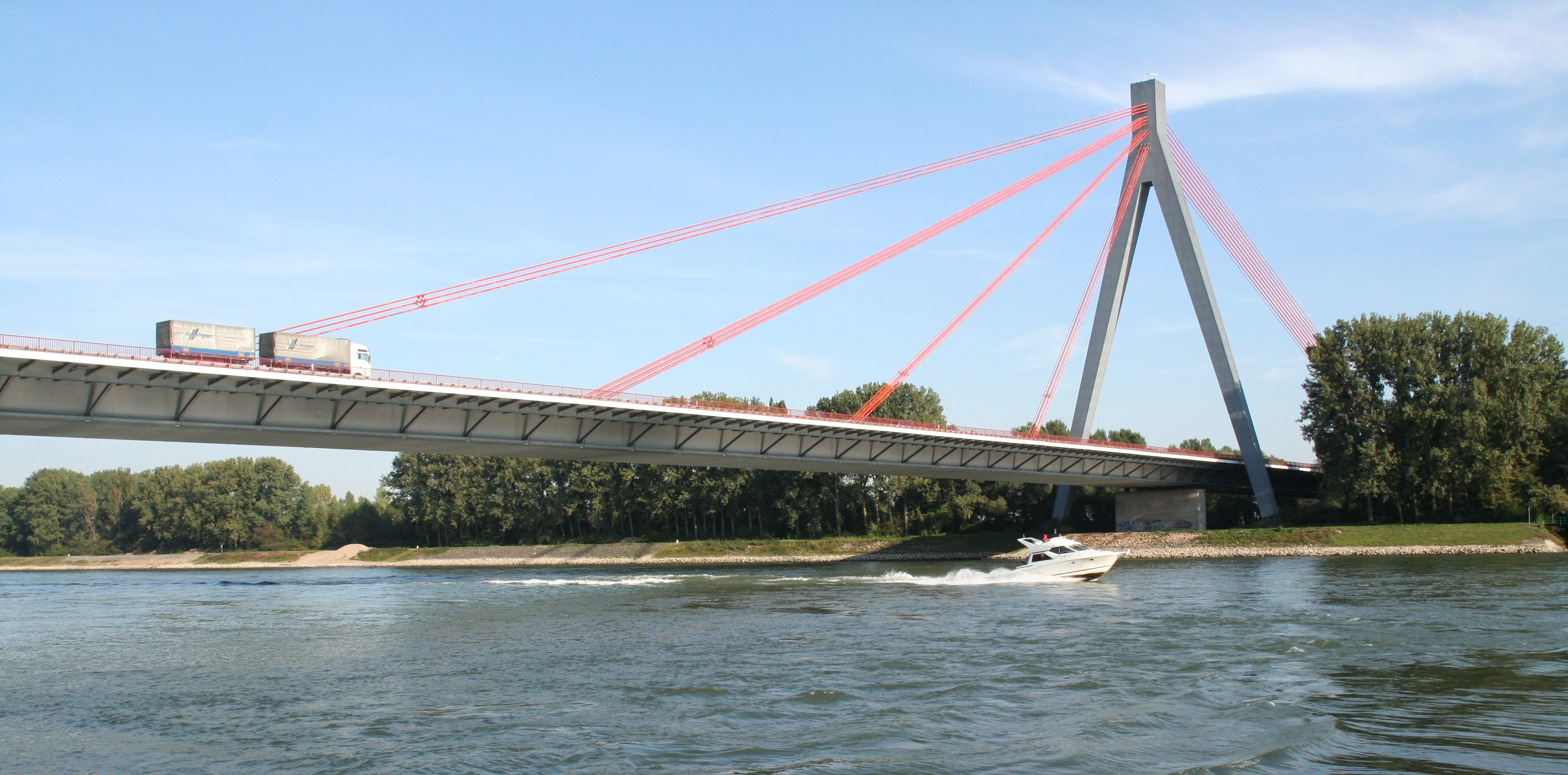
Motorway A61 crossing the Rhine near Speyer

The Wilhelmian era provided Speyer with numerous stately new buildings: In commemoration of the Protestation of 1529 the neogothic Gedächtniskirche, or Memorial Church (height: 105 m), begun in 1890, was consecrated in 1904, with financial support from Emperor William II and from Protestants all around the world. The event gave cause for considerable criticism in a town characterized by a Catholic cathedral and bishop. In reaction, only a few metres away, the Catholics built the twin-tower Saint-Joseph's Church (height 92.5 m). Together with the 4 towers of the cathedral and the Altportal these two churches dominate the skyline of Speyer.

Between 1906 and 1910 the Historical Museum of the Palatinate was erected. With the neighbouring building of the district archives, the Protestant Consistory of the Palatine Church, the Humanistic Grammar School and the Bishop's seat built around the same time, the cathedral square received a character which it has kept to this very day. Another building of the Wilhelmian period worth mentioning is the railway station. With the end of World War I and the occupation of the west bank of the Rhine in 1918, French troops once again occupied the town.

As early as the end of 1918 the French occupational forces under General Gérard supported a movement under the leadership of Ludwig Haass which called itself “Free Palatinate.” This was one of several separatist movements in the French occupation zone on the left bank of the Rhine. In early summer of 1919 the Free Palatinate attempted a putsch in Speyer for an autonomous Palatinate. This attempt failed miserably, especially because of the resistance of the deputy chief administrator, Friedrich von Chlingensperg (1860–1944), who could count on the support of the majority of the Palatinate parties. After a few hours the poorly planned coup was aborted.

However, the call for a free Palatinate was not yet dead and Speyer was to remain the focus of such endeavours. Only a few years later, voices were again raised to separate the Palatinate from Bavaria. Among these was former prime minister Johannes Hoffman, who unsuccessfully tried to separate the Palatinate from Bavaria and form an independent state within the Empire on October 24, 1923, while Munich was being rocked by civil-war-like conditions.

At the same time, more radical separatist groups were forming with the goodwill of the French, who still occupied the left bank of the Rhine. In a coup in Aachen on 21 October 1923 under Hans Adam Dorten, the “Rhenisch Republic” was proclaimed in the north of the occupation zone. Starting in November 1923, separatists occupied several towns in the Palatinate and also raised the green, white and red flag. On 10 November the rebels stormed the government building in Speyer.

The leader of the separatists was Franz Josef Heinz (1884–1924) from Orbis near Kirchheimbolanden, member of the district council for the Deutsche Volkspartei (DVP). He proclaimed the “autonomous Republic of the Palatinate.” While the new government was getting itself established, resistance was already being organised on the opposite side of the Rhine. On the evening of January 9, 1924, 20 men came across the frozen Rhine, stormed the “Wittelsbach Court,” a hotel-restaurant in Speyer, where Heinz was dining and shot him, an aide and an uninvolved third person. A monument still exists in the Speyer cemetery to two of the paid assassins who died in a following shoot-out with the police.

In 1929, still under French occupation, the town celebrated the 400th anniversary of the Protestation. The following year, now under Bavarian suzerainty, Speyer celebrated the 900th anniversary of the founding of the cathedral.

With the seizure of power by the Nazis in 1933, the "Gleichschaltung" (forcing into line) was also enforced in Speyer. On 9 November 1938, in the night known as Kristallnacht), the Speyer Synagogue was burnt down and soon after totally removed. With the beginning of the “Thousand Year Reich”, once again the Jewish population was expelled from Speyer and most of them were eventually killed. Speyer escaped the great bombing raids of World War II; one of the few bombs falling on the town destroyed the railway station. Speyer was taken by the American army, but not before the bridge over the Rhine was blown up by the retreating German army. Until the founding of the Federal Republic of Germany in 1949, Speyer was in the French occupation zone and once again became a garrison town of the French. General Charles de Gaulle took a military parade in front of the cathedral. With its establishment on August 30, 1946, Speyer became part of the new federal state of Rhineland-Palatinate (Rheinland-Pfalz).

In the economic upswing of the 1950s and 1960s Speyer expanded considerably: new residential and commercial areas were developed, schools, administrative buildings and hospitals were built. After much debate, the main street (Maximilianstrasse) along with some smaller side streets was turned into a pedestrian zone.

For the 2000-year celebration in 1990 the main street, the cathedral district and some parts of the medieval town were elaborately renovated with a new design and Speyer has developed into one of Germany's important tourist centres.
