= Franz Xaver Dieringer =

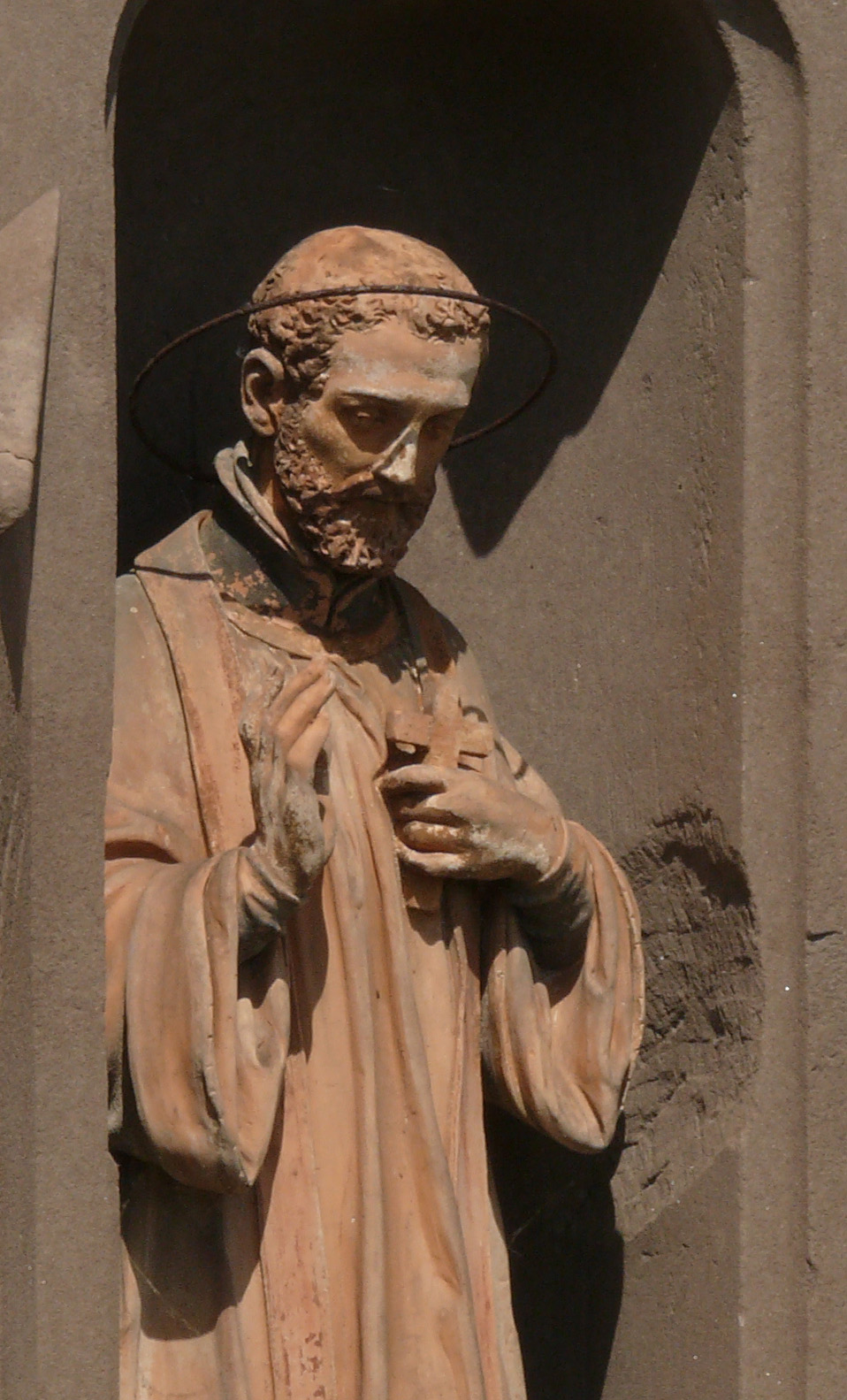
Church monument for Dieringer in Veringendorf (detail)

Franz Xaver Dieringer was a Catholic theologian (22 August 1811, at Rangendingen (Hohenzollern-Hechingen) – 8 September 1876, at Veringendorf (today a district of Veringenstadt)). He was a professor of dogma and homiletics at the University of Bonn.

== Life ==
Dieringer studied theology at Tübingen, was ordained at Freiburg, 19 September 1835, and appointed instructor at the archiepiscopal seminary there. While there, he wrote the first volume of his "System of the Divine Deeds of Christianity". Because of this, he was denied Baden citizenship.

In 1840, Bishop Johannes von Geissel appointed Dieringer professor of dogma at the ecclesiastical seminary of Speyer and at Easter, 1841, he was also made professor of philosophy in the lyceum of the same city. From 1841 to 1843, Dieringer was editor of the Katholik, a periodical founded in 1821 by Andreas Räss and Nicolaus von Weis, afterwards Bishops of Strasburg and Speyer respectively. The purpose was stated to be "to offer the necessary opposition to the attacks, partly open, partly concealed, against the Church, by orthodox articles on the doctrines of faith and morals, Church history and liturgy, the training of children, devotional exercises by the people, and all that belongs to the Catholic Faith".

Geissel became coadjutor bishop of Cologne. He ended the dissensions created by the Hermesian School by suspending the refractory Hermesian professors Braun and Achterfeldt of Bonn; and in the spring of 1843, reorganized the theological faculty of that university by calling in as professors the orthodox Dieringer and Martin. Dieringer was appointed professor in ordinary of dogma and homiletics, and provisional inspector of the preparatory seminary. Dieringer represented a traditional, romantic approach to Catholic studies, rather than the rationalist, enlightment-inspired style of the early part of the century.

When, at his instance, a homiletic-catechetical seminary was established in 1844, he took charge of the homiletic section. Besides performing the duties of his professorship, he published the "Katholische Zeitschrift fur Wissenschaft und Kunst," a periodical devoted to science and church interests, which he had founded in 1844 in opposition to the periodical of the Hermesians. From 1847 to 1849 it appeared as the "Katholische Vierteljahresschrift".

By the mid-1840s secular and Protestant book clubs and reading societies had sprung up in a number of cities. Dieringer took a prominent part in the founding of the Society of St. Charles Borromeo in 1845, of which he was at first secretary and then president from 1846-1871.

In 1853, though retaining his professorship and residing at Bonn, he was made canon of Cologne Cathedral and ecclesiastical councillor. In 1848 he represented the district of Neuss in the parliament at Frankfurt. In April 1849, he took part in a debate in Cologne as to whether Catholic organizations should concern themselves just with religious questions or should speak out on all political issues as a Catholic political party. The discussion centered on the whether a Catholic political party would be good for the Church, and whether it would be more effective for Catholics to work through existing political parties.

His name was among those proposed in 1856 for the vacant See of Paderborn and in 1864 for the See of Trier, but it was removed by the Prussian Government. By the 1860s, German theologians were calling for academic freedom in the use of the relatively new methods of historical criticism in order to place them on par with Protestant historians and theologians. At the same time, the hierarchy was more concerned with the threat of liberalism and attempts to undermine doctrine, and favored a Neo-Scholastic approach. Dieringer and others attempted to mediate between the two groups.

Though his earlier teaching, especially in his "Laienkatechismus", had been in accordance with the doctrine of papal infallibility, at the time of the First Vatican Council he joined the opposition. After negotiations of some length, he yielded to the demand of the Archbishop of Cologne, Paul Melchers, and made his submission.

In order to escape from the strained relations which existed among the divided faculty, Dieringer resigned his offices and dignities during the spring of 1871 and took charge of the parish of Veringendorf in Hohenzollern. In 1874 he was among those recommended for the Archdiocese of Freiburg, but he could not accede to the demands of the government of the Grand Duchy of Baden. After 1874 he was constantly in failing health.

== Works ==
Dieringer's works include:

- System der göttlichen Thaten des Christenthums, oder, Selbst-begründung des Christenthums, voilzogen durch seine göttlichen Thaten (Mainz, 1841, 2nd ea., 1857), a work which clearly shows the influence of Staudenmaier, especially in its first edition
- Lehrbuch der katholischen Dogmatik (Mainz, 1847; 5th ed., 1865)
- Laienkatechismus über Religion, Offenbarung and Kirche (Mainz, 1865; 2nd ed. 1868), a work on theology for popular audiences
- Der heil. Karl Borromäus und die Kirchenverbesserung seiner Zeit (Cologne, 1846), the widely-circulated first publication of the Society of St. Charles Borromeo
- Kanzelvorträge an gebildete Katholiken auf alle Sonn- und Festtage des Kirchenjahres (Mainz, 1844), a homiletic work
- Das Epistelbuch der katholischen Kirche, theologisch erklärt (Mainz, 1863), also homiletic
- Offenes Sendschreiben über die kirchlichen Zustände der Gegenwart an Dr. J. B. von Hirscher (Mainz, 1849), against Hirscher's publication under the same title
- Dogmatische Erorterungen mit einem Güntherianer (Mainz, 1852), a polemical work
- Die Theologie der Vor- und Jetztzeit, ein Beitrag zur Verständigung (Bonn, 1868; 2nd ed., 1869), against Joseph Kleutgen's Theologie der Vorzeit
- Expositio doctrinae Tertulliani de republica et de officiis ac iuribus civium christianorum (University Program; Bonn, 1850)
