= Borromeo =

Borromeo is a surname. Notable people with the surname include:

- House of Borromeo, an aristocratic family in Milan

== Members of the House of Borromeo ==
- Andrea Borromeo (c. 1615 – 1683), Theatine priest
- Charles Borromeo (1538 – 1584), cardinal of the Roman Catholic Church
- Federico Borromeo (1564 – 1631), archbishop of Milan, cousin of Charles
- Celia Grillo Borromeo (1684 – 1777), Italian (Genovese) mathematician and scientist
- Beatrice Borromeo (born 1985), Italian journalist
- Matilde Borromeo (born 1983), Italian equestrian
- Agostino Borromeo (1944–2024), Italian professor and historian, General Governor of the Order of the Holy Sepulchre

== Other people ==
- Alexander Borromeo (born 1983), Filipino football player
- Charles Borromeo (athlete) (born 1958), Indian track and field athlete
- Leah Borromeo, British journalist and filmmaker
- Luis Borromeo or Borromeo Lou, Filipino jazz pianist and vaudeville performer

== See also ==
- Peschiera Borromeo, a municipality in Milan, Italy
- Borromean clinic, a model of psychoanalytic practice
- Collegio Borromeo, a university hall of residence in Pavia, Italy
- Borromean rings, an arrangement of topological circles
  - Molecular Borromean rings, an interlocked molecular architecture
- Sisters of Mercy of St. Borromeo, a group of Catholic religious congregations
- Society of St. Charles Borromeo, a German Catholic literary association
- Charles Borromeo Church (disambiguation)
- Borromeo String Quartet
