= Borromean =

Borromean is something connected to the family of Borromeo or to the Borromean rings. That may be,

- Borromean clinic
- Borromean Islands
- Borromean nucleus
- Borromean rings
- Molecular Borromean rings
