= San Francesco all'Immacolata, Siracusa =

Church in Sicily, Italy

San Francesco all'Immacolata
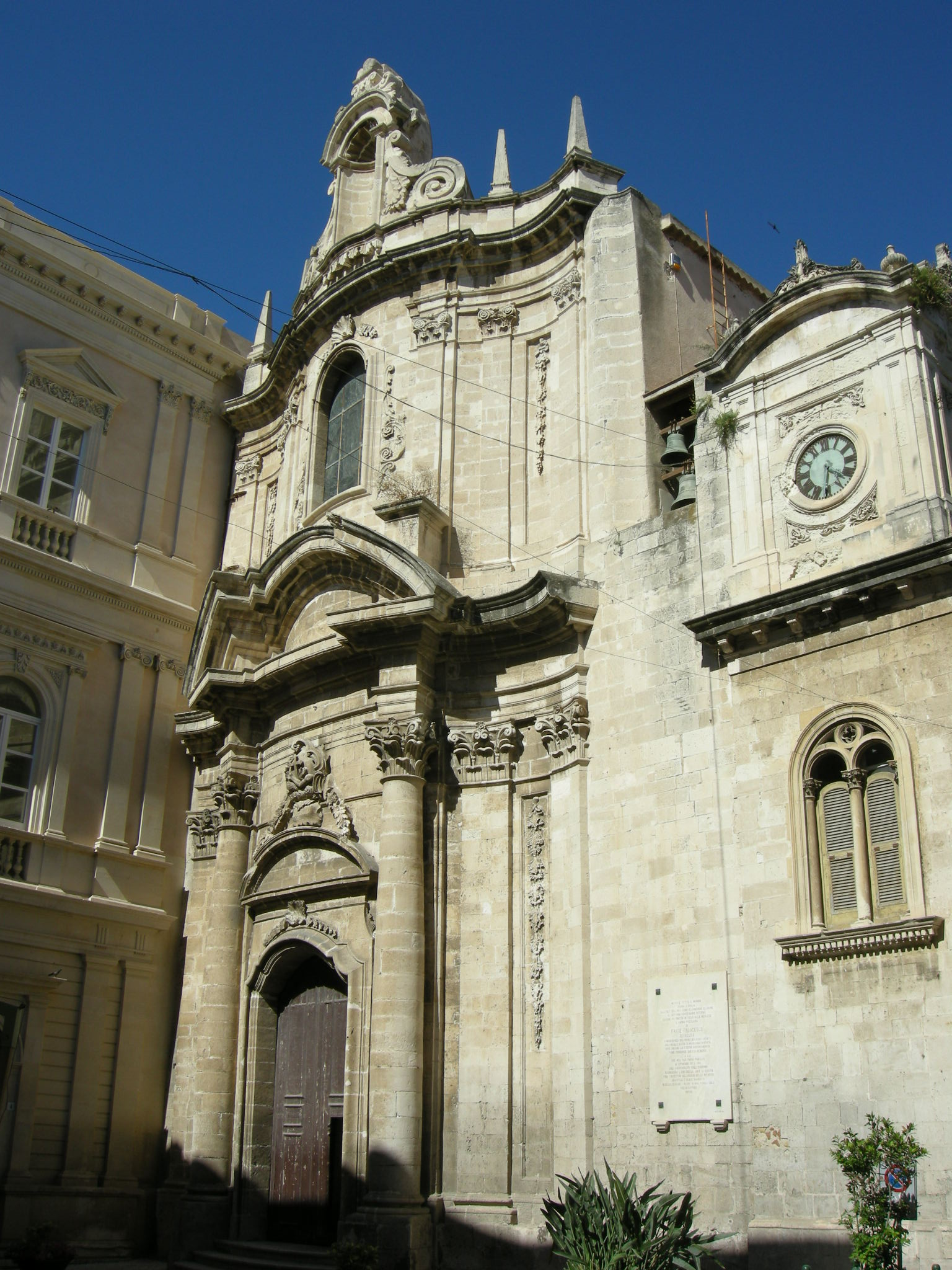
- Facade and bell-tower

Religion
- Affiliation: Catholic Church
- Province: Siracusa

Location
- Location: Siracusa, Italy
- Interactive map of San Francesco all'Immacolata
- Coordinates: 37°03′39″N 15°17′46″E

Architecture
- Type: Church
- Style: Baroque

San Francesco all'Immacolata is a baroque-style, Roman Catholic church located on Piazza Francesco Corpaci on the island of Ortigia, in the historic city center of Siracusa in Sicily, Italy.

== Description ==
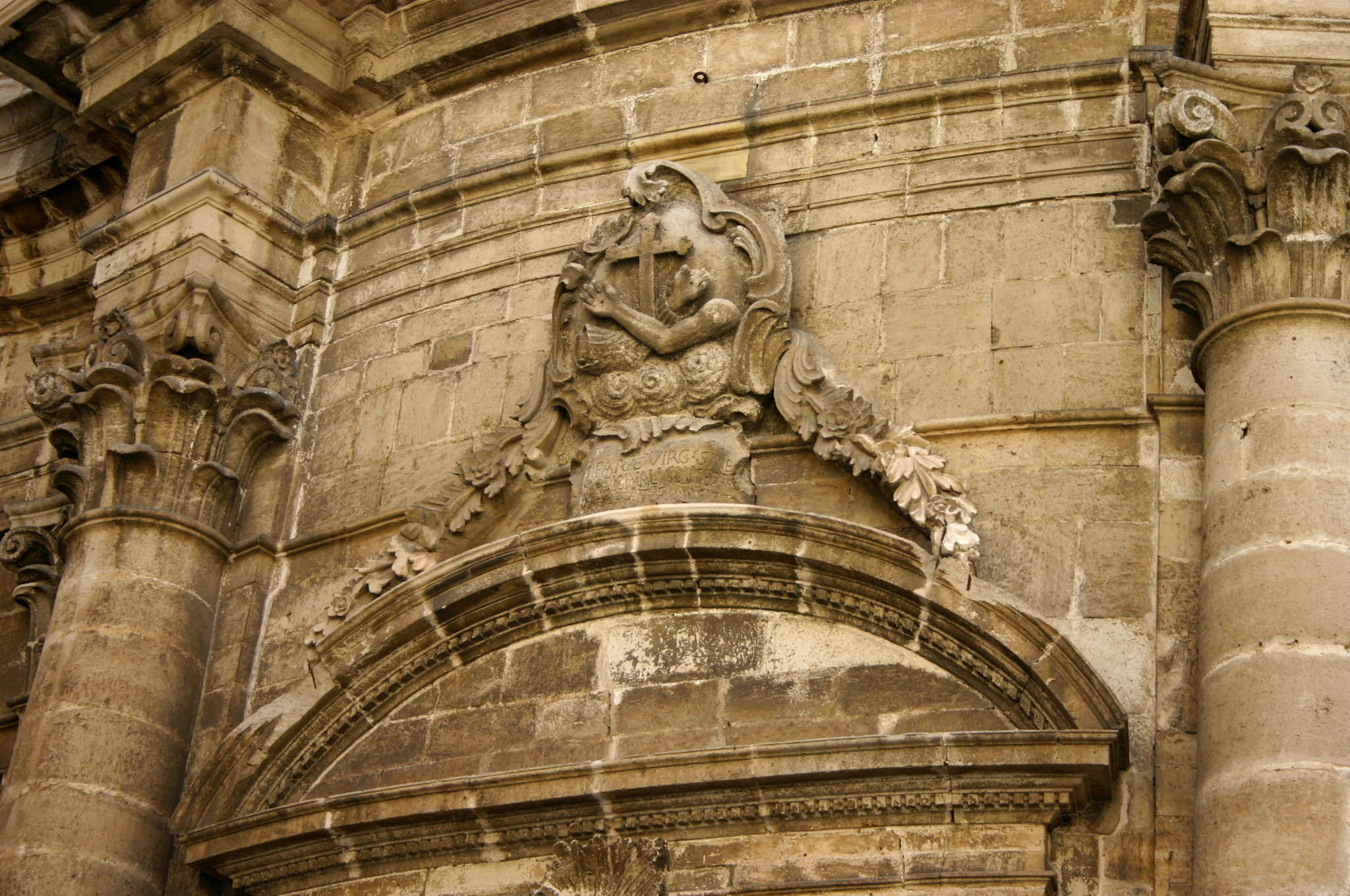
Franciscan symbols above portal

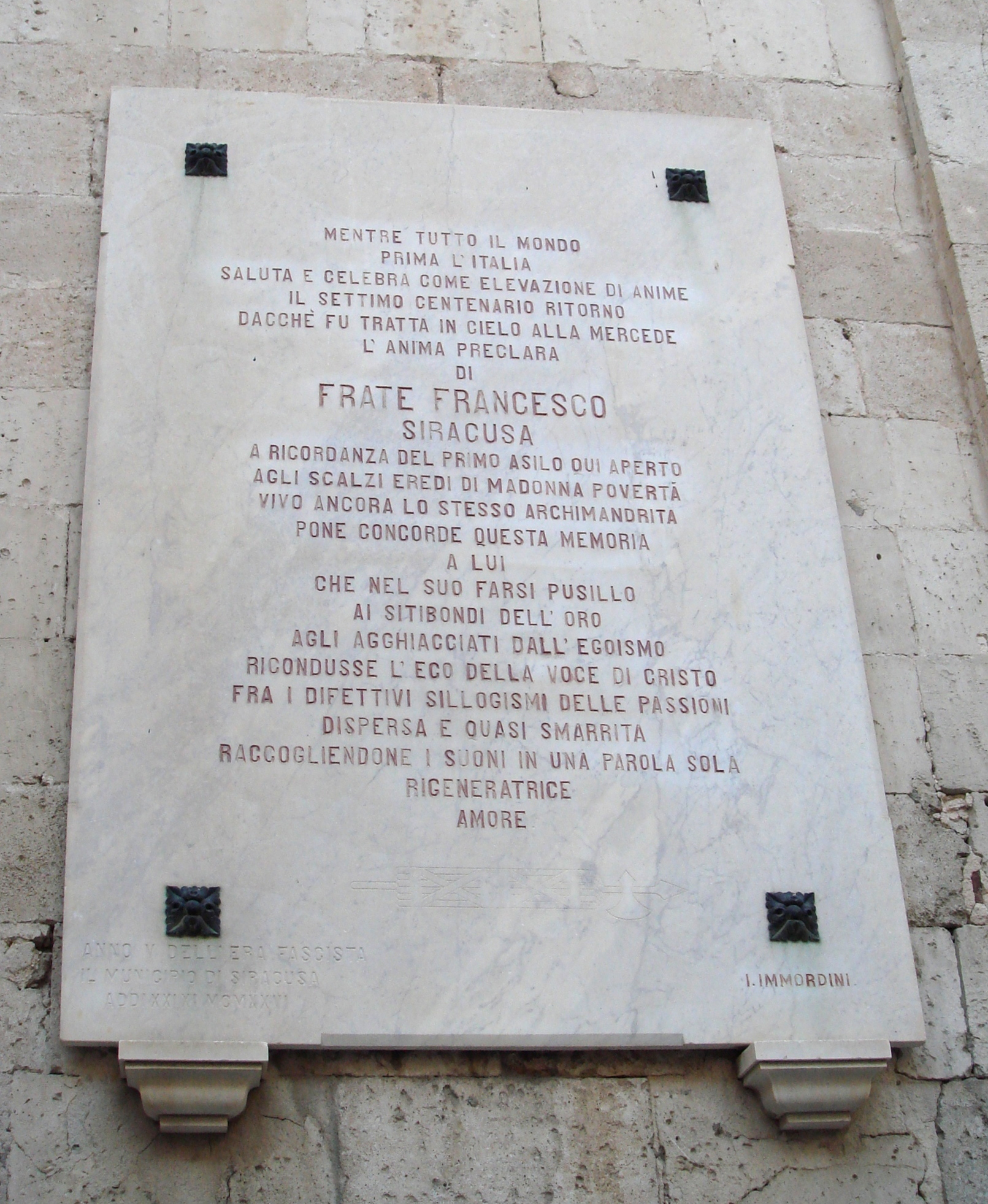
Plaque on belltower

The Order of Friars Minor Conventual or Franciscan friars owned a church at this site, initially dedicated to the apostle St Andrew, but in the 16th century rededicated to the Marian venerations of the Immaculate Conception and the Madonna del Socorso. The church underwent a major refurbishment in 1613 with addition of marble stairs and altars. The ceiling frescoes depict the Glory of the Virgin of the Immaculate Conception with Saints Francis and Anthony by Giuseppe Cristodoro. In the 19th century after a fire in the church of Sant'Andrea dei Teatini (Theatines), the painting of St Andrew from that church was moved to San Francesco. The clock from that church was also moved to the bell-tower, rebuilt in 1876. The coat of arms above the facade portal displays the symbols of the Franciscan order, the crossed arms before the cross of Christ. Twentieth century restorations have uncovered a 15th-century portal opening to the sacristy.

The plaque at the base of the bell-tower recalls a visit by St Francis to Sicily, but the fascist symbols and dating add a dissonant addition to a Franciscan church.
