= Würzburg Bishops' Conference =

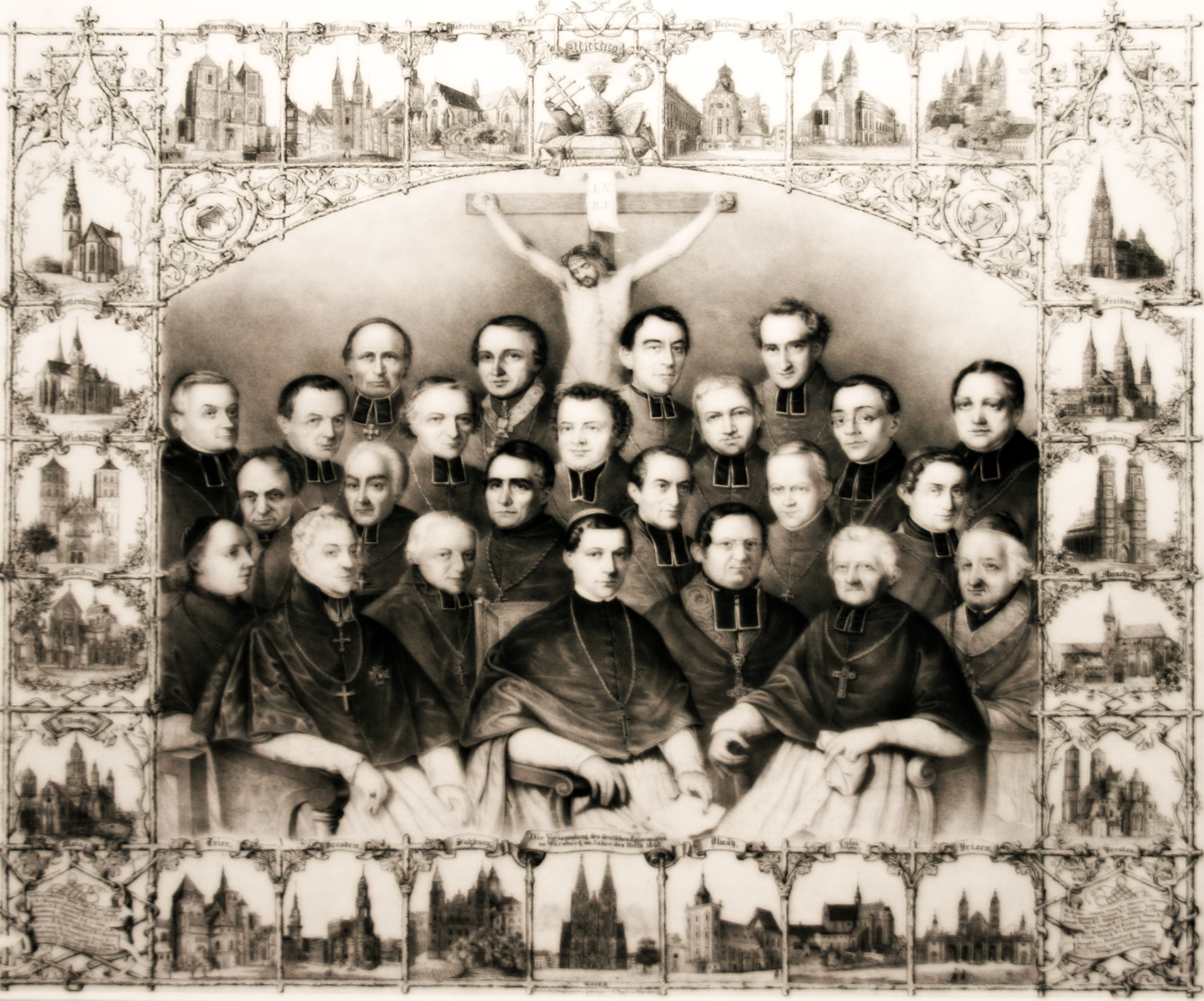
Contemporary memorial picture of the conference with portraits of the bishops and their cathedrals

The Würzburg Bishops' Conference of 1848 was a four-week workshop of the German Catholic bishops in Würzburg. It can be regarded as the birth of the German and Austrian bishops' conferences.

== History ==
The hastily called meeting began on 21 October 1848, just three weeks after the Cologne Archbishop Johannes von Geissel had issued the invitations. It ended unexpectedly after lengthy deliberations on 16 November. Twenty-five diocesan bishops or their representatives, and selected theological advisers, participated. However, no laymen participated. The venue was the Würzburg seminary, for the last three days of the Franciscan monastery of Würzburg. It was hosted by the Bishop of Würzburg Georg Anton von Stahl.

The bishops had a strict work discipline with eight hours of daily conferences. The liturgical high point was a Pontifical Mass in the Würzburg Cathedral under the direction of the Primate Germaniae of Archbishop Cardinal Friedrich Johannes Jacob Celestin von Schwarzenberg. A noteworthy sign was the charitable feeding of 300 poor citizens of Würzburg. The bishops worked at the tables serving the poor.

The shortness of the advance notice, the high number of participants and the long duration of the meeting are evidence of the urgency of the issues at hand. The end of the ecclesiastical order with their spiritual territories was less than 50 years ago and the reorganization of the German dioceses only 25 years. Since 18 May 1848, in the Frankfurt Parliament there was a controversial discussion about the future government and constitutional order in Germany and the bishops didn't want to be bystanders only. They formulated policy statements on the relationship between church and state, the church school inspection, the legal status of the clergy and on issues of societal and social order. They adopted three memoranda: one to all the faithful, one to the government and one to the clergy.

However, the intended official national synod did not follow, because for it a papal authorization was required, and the Curia was afraid of national church tendencies, because the Bavarian bishops in the Freising Bishops' Conference and the bishops of the Habsburg monarchy in the Episcopal Conference of Austria went their own ways.

== Participants ==
The lithography above shows from left to right in the...

first row:

- Karl August von Reisach (1800–1869), Archbishop of Munich and Freising, Cardinal later
- Maximilian Joseph Gottfried von Sommerau Beeckh (1769–1853), Archbishop of Olomouc
- Bonifaz Kaspar von Urban (1773–1858), Archbishop of Bamberg
- Friedrich Johannes Jacob Celestin von Schwarzenberg (1809–1885), archbishop of Salzburg, and later Cardinal Archbishop of Prague
- Johannes von Geissel (1796–1864), Archbishop of Cologne, Cardinal later
- Hermann von Vicari (1773–1868), Archbishop of Freiburg
- Galura Bernhard (1764–1856), Bishop of Brixen

second row:

- Melchior von Diepenbrock (1798–1853), prince bishop of Breslau, later Cardinal, also a member of the Frankfurt National Assembly
- Carl Anton Lüpke (1775–1855), senior bishop of Osnabrück and titular bishop of Anthedon
- Peter von Richarz (1783–1855), Bishop of Augsburg
- Peter Leopold Kaiser (1788–1848), Bishop of Mainz
- Henry of Hofstätter (1805–1875), Bishop of Passau
- Georg Anton von Stahl (1805–1870), Bishop of Würzburg

third row:

- Johann Georg Müller (1798–1870), Bishop of Münster, also a member of the Frankfurt National Assembly
- Valentine of Riedel (1802–1857), Bishop of Regensburg
- Nicholas Weis (1796–1869), Bishop of Speyer
- Jakob Joseph Wandt (1780–1849), Bishop of Hildesheim
- William Arnoldi (1798–1864), Bishop of Trier
- Peter Josef Blum, (1808–1884), Bishop of Limburg
- Franz Drepper (1787–1855), Bishop of Paderborn
- Anastasius Sedlag (1787–1856), Bishop of Kulm (Kingdom of Prussia)
- George von Oettl (1794–1866), Bishop of Eichstätt
- Josef von Lipp (1794–1869), Bishop of Rottenburg
- Joseph Dittrich († 1853), Titular Bishop of Corycus, Apostolic Vicar in the Kingdom of Saxony

Not shown in the picture is Franz Grossmann of the Prince-Bishopric of Warmia who represented Bishop Joseph Ambrose Geritz. Also, other clerics took part as consultants, e.g. the Cathedral Provost of Cologne Eduard Herzog.
