= Peter Joseph Elvenich =

German Catholic theologian and philosopher (1796–1886)

Peter Joseph Elvenich (29 January 1796 – 16 June 1886) was a German Catholic theologian and philosopher born in Embken, a village that today is part of Nideggen, North Rhine-Westphalia. He was a principal supporter and defender of Hermesianism, a theological belief system based on the teachings of Georg Hermes (1775–1831).

He studied theology and philosophy in Münster and Bonn, and in 1821 became a schoolteacher in Koblenz. During the following year he became a lecturer at the University of Bonn, where in 1826 he became an associate professor of philosophy. In 1829 he attained a full professorship at the University of Breslau, where in 1837 he took on additional duties as librarian.

Following the papal decrees of 26 September 1835 and 7 January 1836, of which Pope Gregory XVI condemned writings issued by Georg Hermes, Elvenich, along with Johann Wilhelm Joseph Braun (1801–1863), traveled to Rome in order to the convince the Pope to revise the decrees of condemnation. Their efforts were in vain, and several years later the condemnation was reiterated by Pope Pius IX. In 1843 Elvenich was removed from his post in Breslau at the request of Johannes von Geissel, coadjutor to the Archbishop of Cologne. After the Vatican Council of 1870, he became a member of the Old Catholic Church.

== Selected publications ==
- Verteidigungsschrift in 2 Lieferungen, (Breslau 1839)
- Der Hermesianismus und Johannes Perrone, sein römischer Gegner (Hermesianism and Giovanni Perrone, etc.), (part 1 Breslau 1844)
- Aktenstücke zur geheimen Geschichte des Hermesianismus (Documents on the secret history of Hermesianism), (Breslau 1845)
- Pius IX..., die Hermesianer und der Erzbischof Johannes von Geissel (Pius IX... Hermesianism and Archbishop Johannes von Geissel (Breslau 1848)
- Die Wesenheit des Geistes (The entity of the spirit), (Breslau 1857)
- Drei gegen Einen in der Reinkensschen Angelegenheit unter dem Namen Sincerus Pacificus, Breslau 1862)
- Beiträge aus der Provinz in der Baltzerschen Angelegenheit unter dem Namen Mich. Schlichting, (Breslau 1864)
- Die Beweise für das Dasein Gottes nach Cartesius (The evidence for the existence of God after René Descartes), (Breslau 1868)
- Der unfehlbare Papst and Der Papst und die Wissenschaft ("The infallible Pope", and "The Pope and science"), 1870
