= Dieringer =

Dieringer is a surname. Notable people with the surname include:

- Alex Dieringer (born 1993), American wrestler
- Darel Dieringer (1926–1989), American stock car racing driver
- Franz Xaver Dieringer (1811–1876), Roman Catholic theologian
- Ray Dieringer, American basketball coach
