= Johann Jakob Humann =

German Roman Catholic clergyman (1771–1834)

- Bishop of Mainz
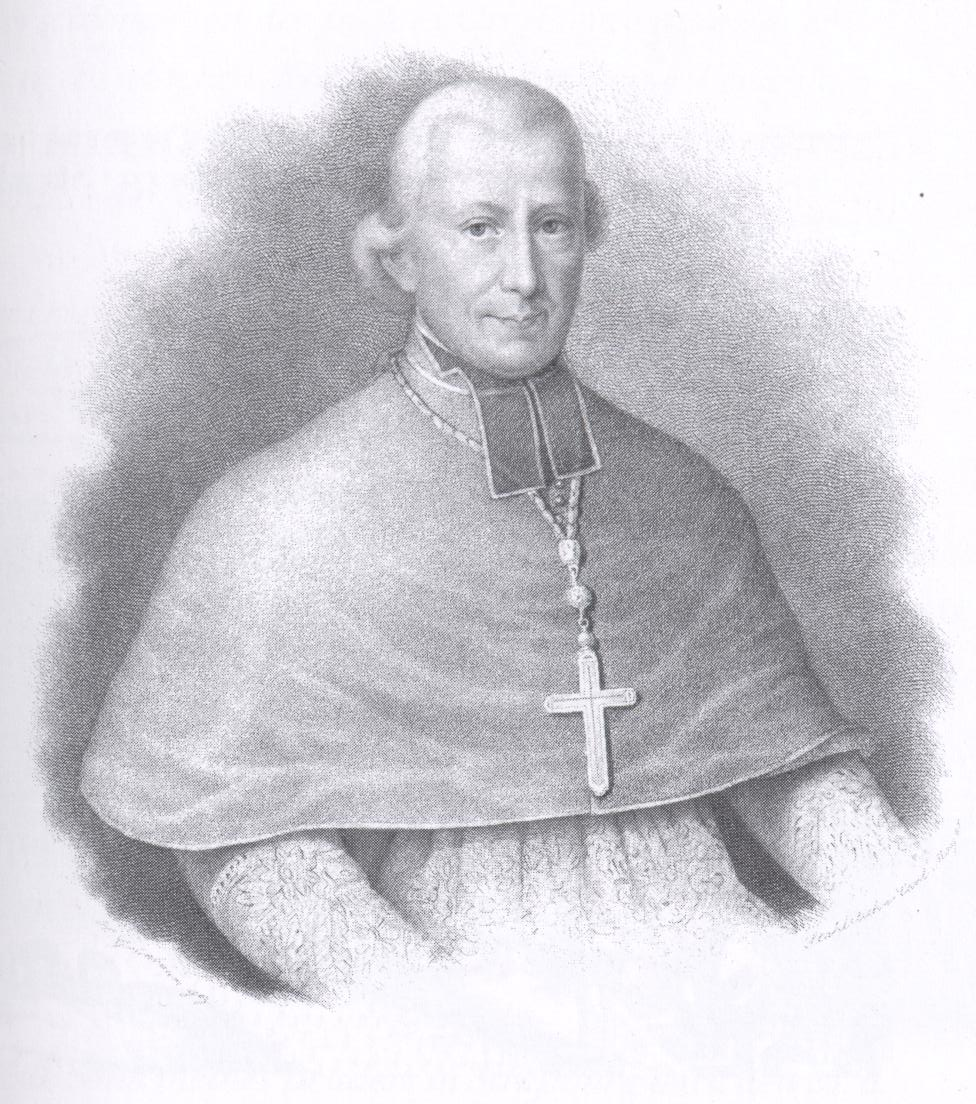
- Church: Catholic Church
- Diocese: Diocese of Mainz
- In office: 20 January 1834 – 19 August 1834
- Predecessor: Joseph Vitus Burg
- Successor: Petrus Leopold Kaiser

Orders
- Ordination: 21 May 1796
- Consecration: 11 June 1834 by Johann Leonhard Pfaff

Personal details
- Born: 7 May 1771 Strasbourg, Alsace, Kingdom of France
- Died: 19 August 1834 (aged 63) Mainz, Grand Duchy of Hesse and by Rhine, German Confederation
- Coat of arms

Johann Jakob Humann (7 May 1771, Strasbourg – 19 August 1834, Mainz) was a German Roman Catholic clergyman. From 1806, he was vicar general of the Roman Catholic Diocese of Mainz and then Vicar Apostolic for the "redrawn" Roman Catholic Diocese of Speyer from 1817 to 1821. He also served as Mainz's Vicar Apostolic from 1818 to 1830 and briefly as its bishop in 1834.
