= Antoine Ritti =

French psychiatrist

Antoine Ritti (6 February 1844, Strasbourg - 23 January, 1920, Paris) was a French psychiatrist.

Ritti, whose uncle was Andreas Räss, the Bishop of Strasbourg, seemed originally destined to become a priest. However he chose to take up a medical career. He began his training as a psychiatrist at the asylum of Fains Meuse. He became influenced by the ideas of Auguste Comte becoming a positivist. In 1869 this time he published his first work, La Pensée Nouvelle. Following the outbreak of the Franco-Prussian War he left Alsace for Paris, working at the Lariboisière Hospital during the Paris Commune. He obtained an in-house post at the Charenton Asylum. In 1878 he was appointed to a doctor's office in Charenton, a position he held until his retirement in 1909.

Ritti studied under Jules Bernard Luys and applied Luys' anatomical-functional discoveries to develop a theory of the role of the thalamus in the pathophysiology of hallucinations. For 38 years, from 1882 to 1920, Ritti was Secretary-General of the Medico-Psychological Society. During these years he wrote numerous eulogies and obituaries published in the Annales médico-psychologiques.

Ritti is buried in Père-Lachaise cemetery, in the tomb of the families Bouclier de la Fizelière. Here there is a bust of him by Marthe de la Fizelière.

== Works ==
- La Pensée Nouvelle, (1869)
- Théorie physiologique de l’hallucination, (1874) Thesis for a doctorate in medecine, No. N8C118, Paris
- Le positivisme au congrès ouvrier, (1877), editor
