= Johann Heinrich Achterfeldt =

German theologian (1788–1877)

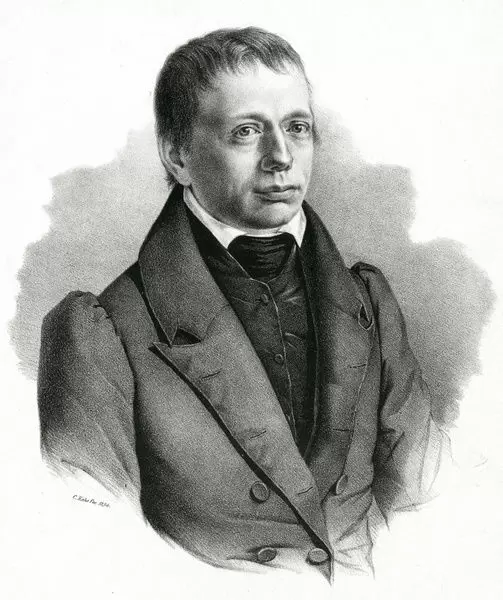
- Born: 17 June 1788; Wesel
- Died: May 11, 1877 (aged 88); Bonn
- Occupation: theologian

Johann Heinrich Achterfeldt (17 June 1788 – 11 May 1877) was a German theologian.

== Biography ==
Achterfeldt was born at Wesel. He was appointed professor of theology at Bonn in 1826 and in 1832 he founded with his colleague, Joseph Braun, the Zeitschrift für Philosophie und Katholische Theologie, the chief purpose of which was to defend the teachings of George Hermes.

He also published under the title Christkatholische Dogmatik (Münster, 1834–1836) the theological writings which Hermes had left after his death. This publication was followed by sharp controversy, and eventually by the condemnation of the works of Hermes, which Pope Gregory XVI placed upon the Index on 26 September 1835. In 1843, Achterfeldt incurred suspension from his professorial chair rather than sign the declaration of faith required by the Coadjutor Archbishop Johannes von Geissel of Cologne. Though Hermesianism lost ground and finally disappeared during the revolution of 1848, Achterfeldt clung to his views. In 1862, however, he was reinstated as professor, and in 1873, having made his submission to ecclesiastical authority, he was freed from suspension. He died at Bonn in 1877.
