= Bruno Franz Leopold Liebermann =

German Catholic theologian

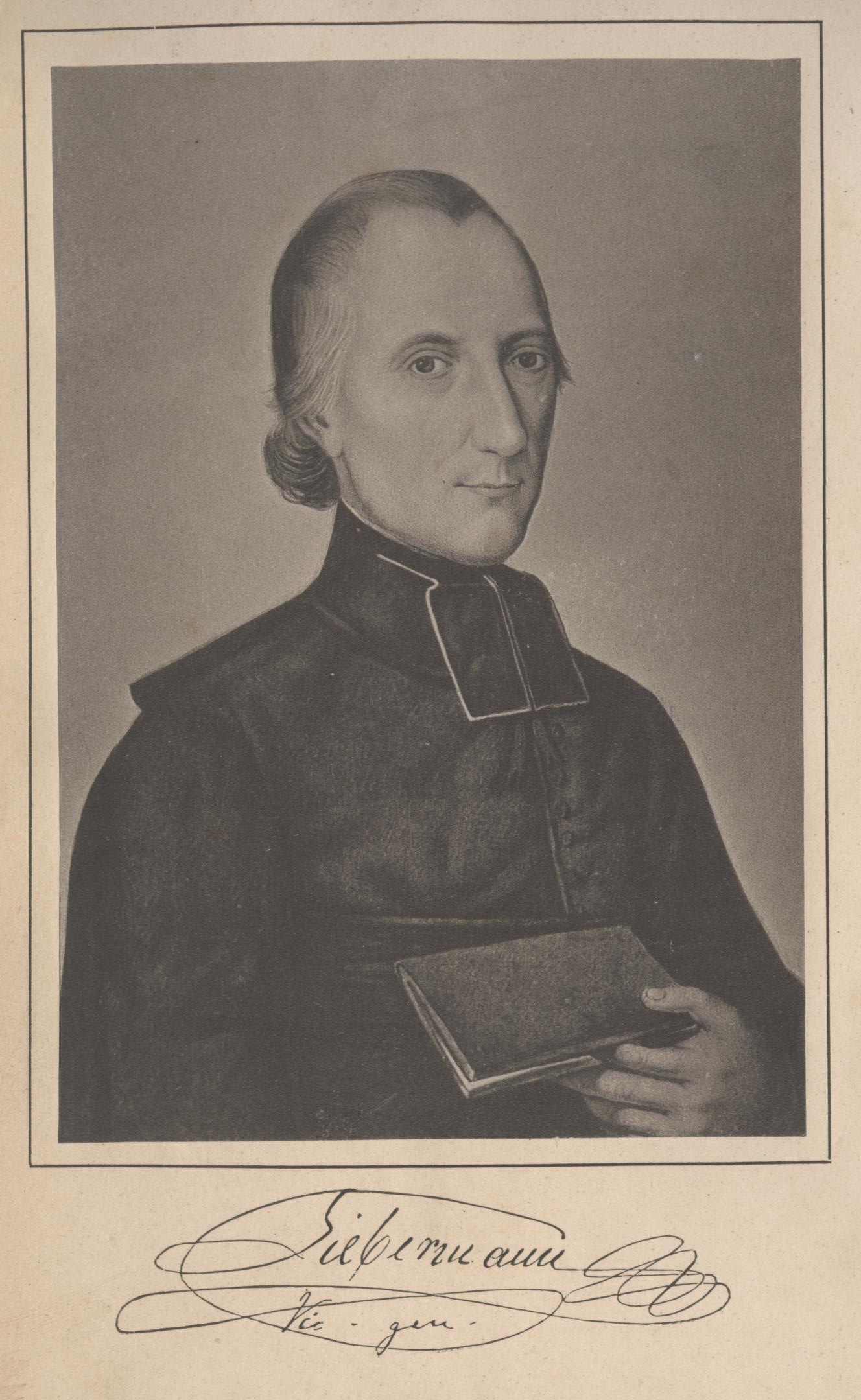
Liebermann, lithograph after a portrait, from Joseph Guerber, Biographie Liebermanns, 1880

Bruno Franz Leopold Liebermann (b. at Molsheim in Alsace, 12 October 1759; d. at Strasbourg, 11 November 1844) was a German Catholic theologian.

== Life ==
Having finished his humanities in the college at Molsheim, he studied theology from 1776 to 1780 in the seminary at Strasbourg, after which, as he was too young for ordination, he was appointed as subdeacon and appointed teacher in the college at Molsheim. He became a deacon and a licentiate of theology in 1782 and was ordained priest on 14 June 1783.

He shortly afterwards became professor in the Strasbourg seminary, in 1784 preacher at Strasbourg Cathedral, and in 1787 pastor at Ernolsheim near Molsheim. During the French Revolution he was obliged to take refuge across the Rhine (1792), and the Bishop of Strasbourg, Cardinal Rohan, appointed him rector of the seminary which had been transferred for the time to the All Saints' Abbey, in the Black Forest.

Here, he taught dogmatic theology and canon law, and wrote his unpublished "Institutiones iuris canonici universalis". In 1795, he secretly returned to his parish at Ernolsheim, where he laboured in secret and in great danger for the cure of souls until 1801, holding at the same time the office of extraordinary episcopal commissary for this division of the diocese. In 1801, he was called to Strasbourg as preacher at the cathedral and secretary of the diocese, but returned once more to Ernolsheim in 1802. On 12 March 1804, he was there unexpectedly arrested, and, on the groundless suspicion that he was in secret communication with the royal family, was held a prisoner in Paris for eight months.

When, through the intercession of Bishop Colmar of Mainz with Napoleon, he regained his freedom, he was called by this bishop to Mainz in 1805 as rector of the newly founded seminary there and in 1806 became also a member of the cathedral chapter. In the seminary, he lectured on canon law, church history, pastoral theology, and, after 1812, also on dogmatic theology.

Personally and through the clergy trained by him, Liebermann exerted influence in Mainz and the adjoining dioceses. Among his pupils were the future bishops Andreas Räss, Nicolaus von Weis, Johannes von Geissel, and such other distinguished men as Klee, Lüft, Adam Franz Lennig, Franz Xaver Remling, and Nickel. After he had declined in 1823 the appointment to the See of Metz, Bishop Tharin summoned him as his vicar-general to Strasbourg. Under Tharin's successor, Bishop Johann Franz Lepape von Trevern, he withdrew more from public life. His last years were spent in retirement in the mother-house of the Sisters of Charity.

== Works ==
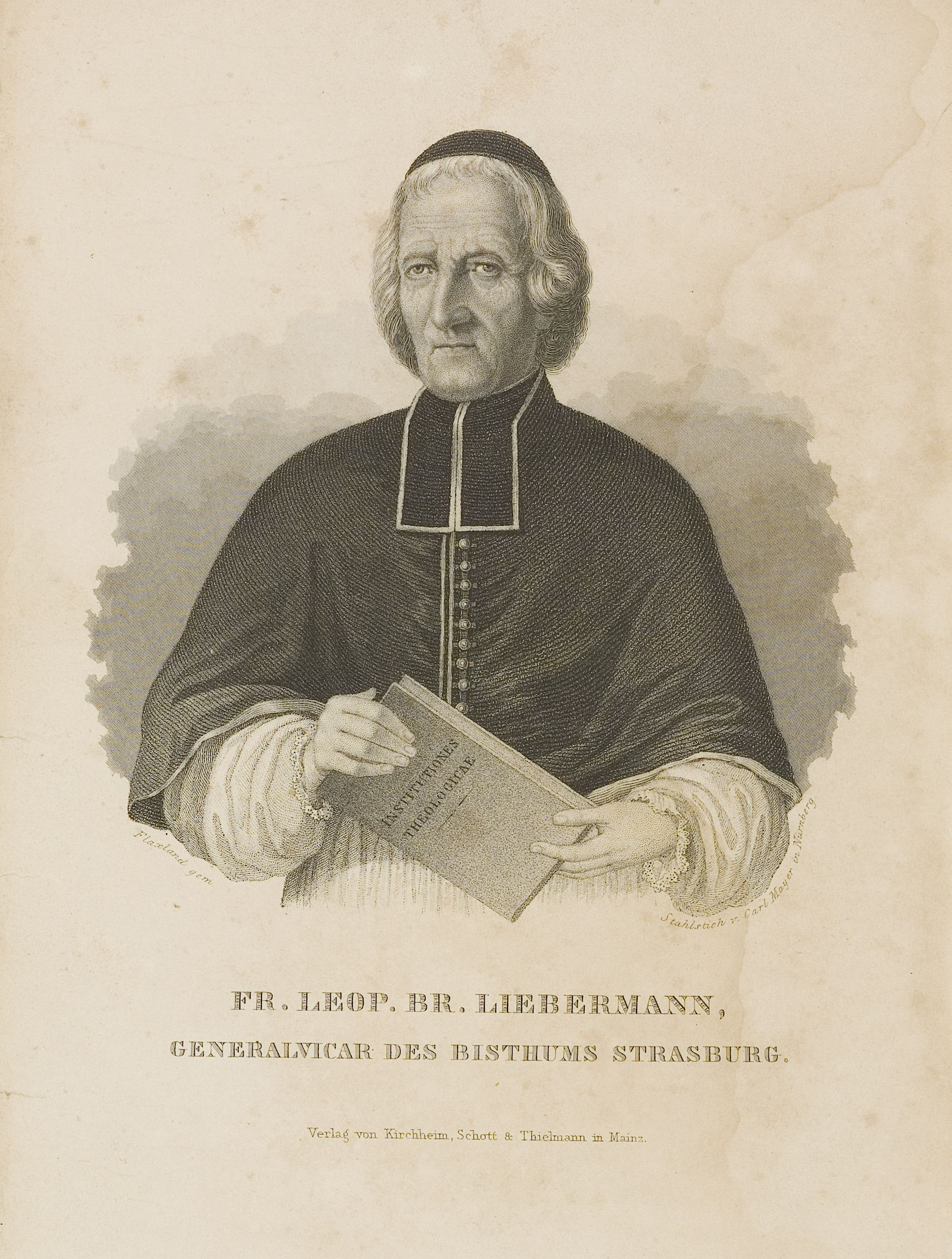
Liebermann

His Institutiones theologicæ were first published in five volumes (Mainz, 1819–27; 6th ed., 1844) and later in two (10th ed., Mainz, 1870). This work was used as a textbook for years in many theological seminaries in Germany, France, Belgium, and America.

During the time of the Revolution, Liebermann published several anonymous pamphlets in defence of the rights of the Church and against the required oath of the civil constitution of the clergy. Of his sermons several have been published separately, e.g. "Lob- und Trauerrede bei Gelegenheit des Hintrittes des hochwürdigsten Herrn Joseph Ludwig Colmar, Bischof zu Mainz" (Mainz, 1818). After his death appeared:- "Liebermann's Predigten, herausgegeben von Freunden und Verehrern des Verewigten" (3 vols., Mainz, 1851–3). From 1825 to 1826, he was editor of the "Der Katholik".
