= Joseph Vitus Burg =

German Roman Catholic clergyman

- Bishop of Mainz
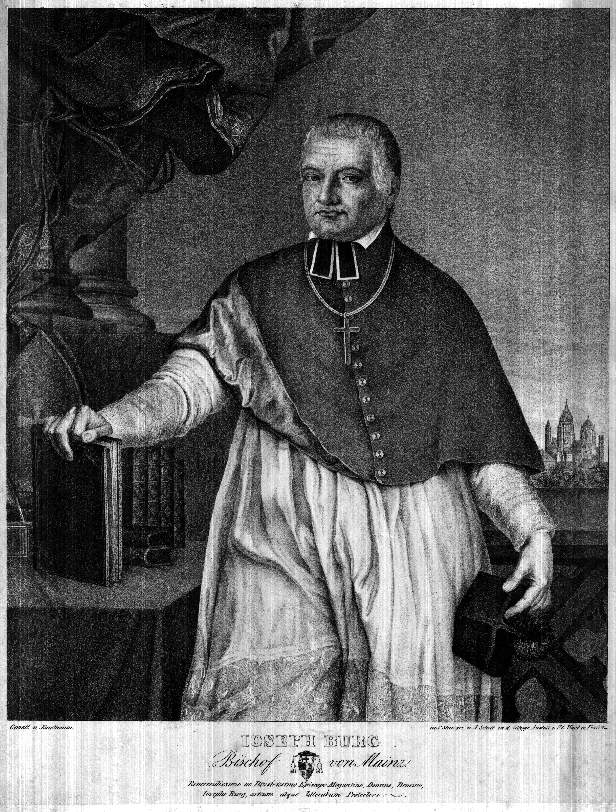
- Church: Catholic Church
- Diocese: Diocese of Mainz
- In office: 29 September 1829 – 22 May 1833
- Predecessor: Joseph Ludwig Colmar
- Successor: Johann Jakob Humann
- Previous posts: Titular Bishop of Rhodiapolis (1828-1829); Auxiliary Bishop of Freiburg im Breisgau (1828-1829)

Orders
- Ordination: 26 September 1791
- Consecration: 28 September 1828 by Jakob Brand

Personal details
- Born: 27 August 1768 Free and Imperial City of Offenburg, Holy Roman Empire
- Died: 22 May 1833 (aged 64) Mainz, Grand Duchy of Hesse, German Confederation
- Coat of arms

Joseph Vitus Burg (27 August 1768, in Offenburg – 22 May 1833, in Mainz) was a German Roman Catholic clergyman. From 1830 until his death he served as the second post-Napoleonic Bishop of Mainz.
