= Society of St. Charles Borromeo =

German Catholic association

The Society of St. Charles Borromeo (Borro-Mäusverein) is a German Catholic association for the encouragement and diffusion of edifying, instructive, and entertaining literature. It was founded in Bonn, in 1845, by Franz Xaver Dieringer, one of the professors of the Catholic theological faculty at Bonn, August Reichensperger, and Freiherr Max von Loe. It ran a book club, and free reading rooms in large cities. From 1902 the society issued a periodical, originally called Borro-mäusblätter, later Die Bücherwelt.

== History ==
Johannes von Geissel, Philipp Krementz, and Hubert Theophil Simar did much to further its aims, and it spread all over Germany.

The society was able to supply its members with a large number of books at a reduced price, often not more than two-thirds of the ordinary cost of the volumes. The society's catalogue for 1906 contained over 10,000 titles of works which could be thus purchased. It dropped this side of its activity from 1907, faced with concerted opposition from the book trade.
