= Freising Bishops' Conference =

Bavarian conference of Catholic bishops

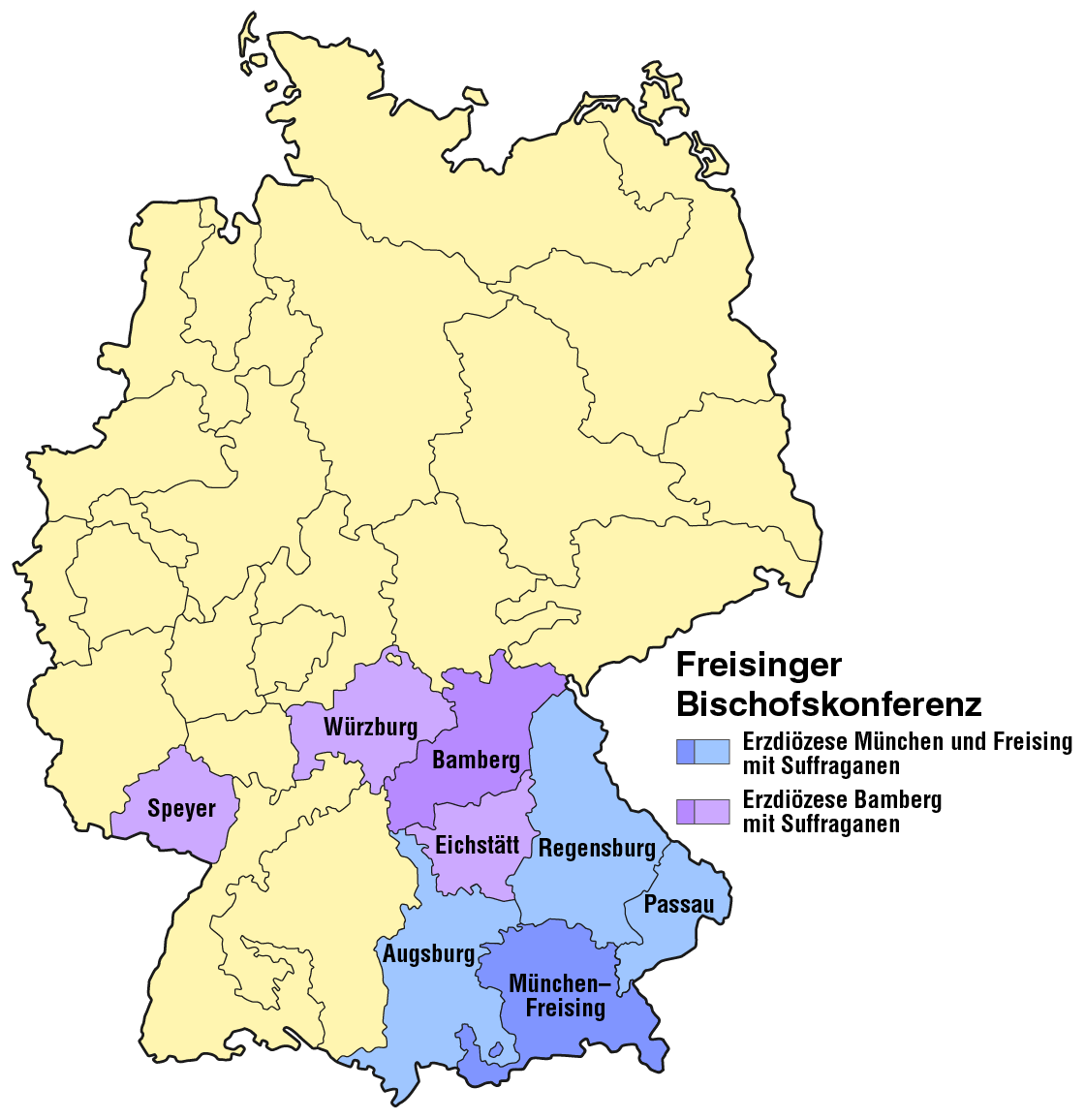
Freising Bishops' Conference

The Freising Bishops' Conference was founded in 1850 for the Bishops of the dioceses in the Kingdom of Bavaria. In it the bishops of the Archdiocese of Munich and Freising in southern Bavaria, with the suffragans of Regensburg, Passau and Augsburg as well as the Franconia Archdiocese of Bamberg with the suffragans of Würzburg, Eichstätt and Speyer are represented. The bishops of these dioceses meet since 1867 twice a year at the Freising cathedral hill, its leader, the Archbishop of Munich and Freising (since 2008 Archbishop Reinhard Marx); Substitute is the Metropolitan of the northern Bavarian ecclesiastical province of Bamberg (since 2002 Archbishop Ludwig Schick). The territory of the diocese of Speyer, although now part of the federal states of Rhineland-Palatinate and Saarland, the boundaries of the Province of Bamberg are unchanged since 1920/1945 - with the exception of the assignment of Thuringia areas of the diocese of Würzburg in the diocese of Erfurt - which is why the Palatinate canonically continues to be a part of Bavaria. The Freising Bishops' Conference has the mission to promote common pastoral duties to coordinate the church's work and provide a platform for mutual consultation. Unlike the German Bishops' Conference, supported by the Bavarian bishops in 1933, it has no decision making powers.

== See also ==
- Würzburg Bishops' Conference
