= Gioacchino Ventura di Raulica =

Sicilian Italian Roman Catholic pulpit orator

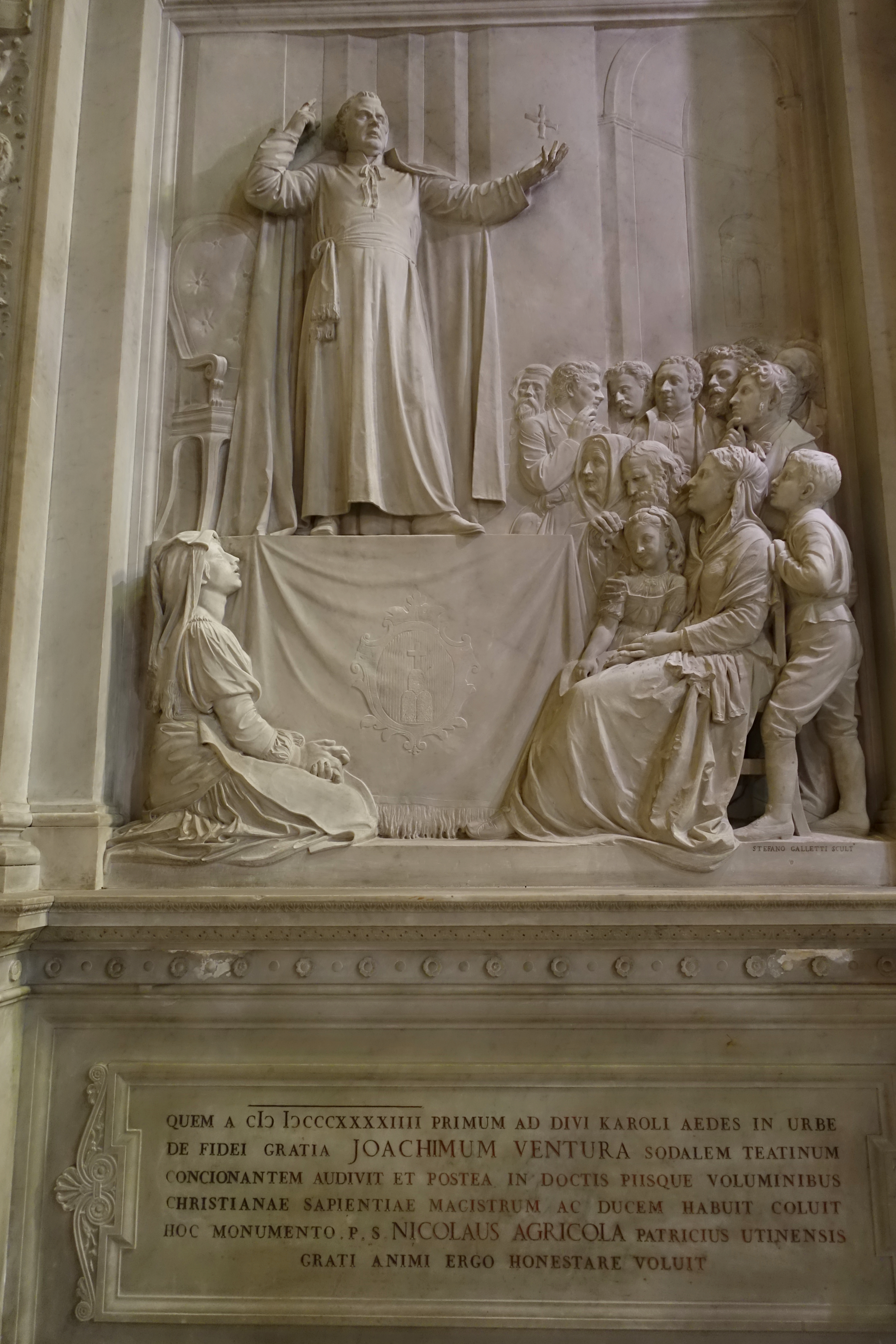
- Memorial to Gioacchino Ventura di Raulica in Sant'Andrea della Valle
- Born: December 8, 1792; Palermo, Kingdom of Sicily (present-day Italy)
- Died: 2 August 1861 (aged 68); Versailles, French Empire (present-day France)
- Occupations: Orator, patriot, philosopher, writer and theologian

Gioacchino Ventura (dei Baroni) di Raulica (8 December 1792 in Palermo – 2 August 1861 in Versailles), was a Sicilian Italian Roman Catholic pulpit orator, patriot, philosopher, writer and theologian, also known for his support of the cause of the Sicilian Revolution of 1848.

== Biography ==
He entered the Society of Jesus in 1808, and in 1817, when the Society was suppressed in Sicily, joined the Theatines. Ordained a priest, he distinguished himself as a Catholic journalist and apologist, as a preacher, especially by his "Funeral Oration of Pius VII" (1823), and as an exponent of the counter-revolutionary worldview of Hughes Felicité Robert de Lamennais, Joseph de Maistre and Louis Gabriel Ambroise de Bonald.

He was appointed by Leo XII professor of canon law at the Sapienza, and in 1830 was elected Superior-General of the Theatines. He published his "De methodo philosophandi" in 1828 and "Bellezze della Fede" in 1839. After his generalship (1830–33) he preached in Rome. His eloquence, though somewhat exaggerated and prolix, was vehement and direct, with a noble bearing, a magnificent voice and an affecting delivery, and it won him great renown. In Paris, though not perfectly master of French, he was said to almost rival the famous Jean-Baptiste Henri Lacordaire.

With the accession of Pope Pius IX, Ventura became politically prominent. His "Funeral Oration of Daniel O'Connell" (1847) glorified the union of religion and liberty. His eulogy of liberty on the "Morti di Vienna" sounded almost like a diatribe against kings in general. It was put on the Index of Prohibited Books.

Ventura maintained the lawfulness of the Sicilian Revolution (cfr. his "Sul riconoscimento della Sicilia, etc.", Palermo, 1848; "Menzogne diplomatiche", etc.). His political ideal was an Italian Confederation under the presidency of the pope. During the exile of Pius IX at Gaeta, Ventura's position in Rome was delicate. Though refusing a seat in the Roman Assembly, he advocated the separation of the ecclesiastical and temporal powers, and in the name of the Sicilians recognized the Roman Republic. As commissioner from Sicily, he was present at a controversial politico-religious ceremony in St. Peter's Basilica, but took no active part in the services. He opposed French intervention in behalf of the pope and when Marshal Oudinot attacked Rome, spoke of Pius IX in words which he bitterly regretted.

On the downfall of the Triumvirs (1849), he went to Montpellier and then to Paris (1851). Here he made an ineffectual attempt to convert his former friend de Lamennais. His Conferences at the "Madeleine" etc. were published as "La raison philosophique et la raison catholique" (1852---). In 1857 he gave the Lenten Sermons at the Tuileries before Napoleon III; these appeared as "Le pouvoir politique chrétien".

Ventura's philosophical views received final expression in "La tradizione e semi-pelagiani della philosophia", "Saggio sull' origine dell'idee", "Philosophie chrétienne" (Paris, 1861). He is a moderate Traditionalist of the Bonald-Bonnetty School. Ventura's private life was irreproachable. He remained a loyal Catholic the rest of his life.

== Legacy ==
The American philosopher Orestes Brownson, who was deeply influenced by Ventura, published several of Ventura’s essays in his quarterly review between 1848 and 1860. Ventura's complete works were published as: "Opere Complete" (31 volumes, Milan, 1854–64); "Opere Postume", (Venice, 1863).

== Sources ==
- This article incorporates text from a publication now in the public domain: Herbermann, Charles, ed. (1913). "Gioacchino Ventura di Raulica". Catholic Encyclopedia. New York: Robert Appleton Company.
- Andreu, Francesco (1961). "Padre Gioacchino Ventura. Saggio biografico". Regnum dei. XVII (65–68): 1–161.
- Lerose, Giovanni (1972). Il pensiero socio-politico di G. Ventura. Naples: La Nuova Cultura.
- Guccione, Eugenio (1994). "The Concept of "Revolution" in the Thought of Gioacchino Ventura". Il Pensiero Politico. 27 (3): 379–392.
- Romano, Sergio (1995). "La vita e il pensiero politico di padre Gioacchino Ventura". Revue belge de philologie et d'histoire (in Italian). 73 (4): 1019–1026. doi:10.3406/rbph.1995.4061.
- Caroniti, Dario (2004). "Chiesa, politica, popolo: Gioacchino Ventura, Luigi Sturzo". Luigi Sturzo e la Democrazia Nella Prospettiva del Terzo Millennio: Atti del Seminario Internazionale, Erice, 7-11 Ottobre 2000. Florence: Leo S. Olschki: 1000–1015. doi:10.1400/48064.
- Lo Presti, Alberto (2018). "Gioacchino Ventura fra tradizione e rivoluzione". Res Publica: Rivista di studi storico politici internazionali. 21 (2): 5–11. doi:10.1400/268900.
- Caroniti, Dario (2018). "Gioacchino Ventura nel pensiero politico americano". Res Publica: Rivista di studi storico politici internazionali. 21 (2): 55–71. doi:10.1400/268903.
- Giurintano, Claudia (2019). "Gioacchino Ventura e Napoleone III: «la résurrection de l'Empire comme celle du jour de Pâques»". Storia e Politica. XI (1): 58–89.
