= Andreas Räss =

Alsatian Catholic Bishop of Strasbourg

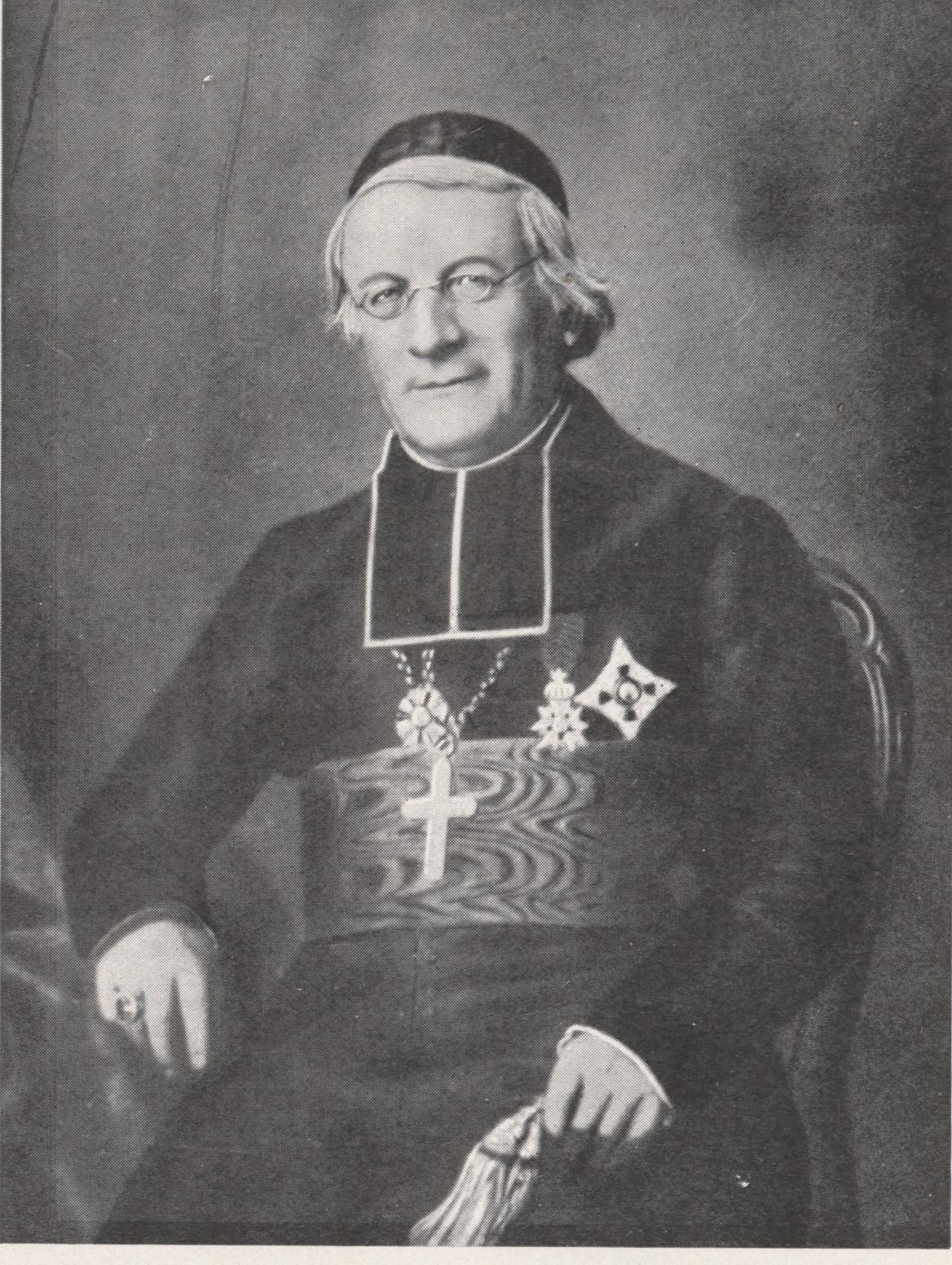
Andreas Räss.

André Raess (German: Andreas Räss) (6 April 1794, Sigolsheim, Haut-Rhin – 17 November 1887, Strasbourg) was an Alsatian Catholic Bishop of Strasbourg.

== Life ==
After receiving his classical training at Sélestat and Nancy, Raess studied philosophy and theology at the seminary at Mainz under Bruno Franz Leopold Liebermann and was ordained priest in 1816. At first he was a teacher in the seminary for boys at Mainz. In 1822 he received the degree of doctor from the theological faculty of Würzburg.

When Liebermann left Mainz for Strasbourg Räss was made, in 1825, director of the seminary at Mainz and professor of dogmatics at the same place. After failing to be elected Bishop of Mainz in 1828, opposed by the Government of the Grand Duchy of Hesse, he had charge for a short time of the theological seminary at Molsheim. In 1829 he became superior of the seminary for priests at Strasbourg and professor of dogmatics, theology, and homiletics. On 5 August 1840, he was made coadjutor Bishop of Strasbourg with the right of succession, and was consecrated on 14 February 1841.

In 1842 he became Bishop of Strasbourg. As bishop he devoted himself particularly to the training of the clergy and the extension of religious societies. He was one of the most determined defenders of papal infallibility at the First Vatican Council. His declaration in 1874 in the German Reichstag that the Treaty of Frankfurt was recognized by the Catholics of Alsace and Lorraine did much to shatter the great popularity he had until then enjoyed among his fellow-countrymen of Alsace.

His nephew was the positivist psychiatrist Antoine Ritti.

== Work ==
In his earlier years, before he was raised to the episcopate, Räss was an active author. One undertaking was the founding, with Nicholas Weis, of the Katholik at Mainz in 1821.

In the years 1819-39, also with the aid of Weis, he published a large number of works, chiefly translations and revisions of French and English originals. These included:

- Alban Butler's Leben der Väter und Märtyrer (20 vols., Mainz, 1823–26; 2nd ed., 23 vols., 1838–40)
- Leben der Heiligen Gottes (4 vols., Mainz, 1826—); later, completely revised by J. Holzwarth (2 vols., Mainz, 1854—); 13th ed. (1903)
- Bibliothek der katholischen Kanzelberedsamkeit (18 vols., Frankfort, 1829–36)
- Annalen der Verbreitung des Glaubens
- Die Convertiten seit der Reformation nach ihrem Leben und aus ihren Schriften dargestellt (13 vols. and index, Freiburg, 1866–80).

Catholic Church titles
Preceded by Johann Franz Lepape von Treven	Bishop of Strasbourg; 1842-1887	Succeeded by Peter Paul Stumpf
