= Theatines =

Catholic Order of Pontifical Right

- Order of Clerics Regular
- Latin: Ordo Clericorum Regularium
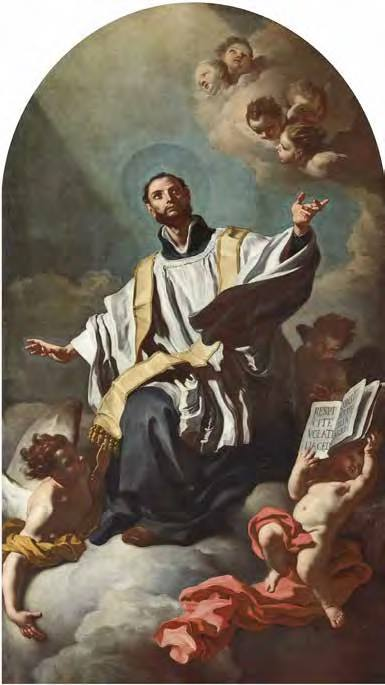
- Saint Cajetan (1480-1547), co-founder of the Theatines
- Abbreviation: CR
- Formation: 14 September 1524; 501 years ago
- Founders: Saint Gaetano Thiene, CR; Archbishop Gian Pietro Carafa
- Type: Order of clerics regular of pontifical right for men
- Headquarters: Sant'Andrea della Valle; Piazza Vidoni, 6 Rome, Italy
- Members: 161 members (124 priests) (2020)
- Superior General: Salvador Rodea González, CR
- Parent organization: Roman Catholic Church
- Website: teatinos.org/en/home/

The Theatines, officially named the Congregation of Clerics Regular (Latin: Ordo Clericorum Regularium; abbreviated CR), are members of a Catholic order of clerics regular of pontifical right for men. The order was founded in virtue of faculties granted by Pope Clement VII on 24 June 1524 in the Brief Exponi Nobis.

== Foundation ==
The order was founded by Saint Cajetan (Gaetano dei Conti di Thiene), by Archbishop Gian Pietro Carafa (afterwards Pope Paul IV), along with Paolo Consiglieri and Bonifacio da Colle. At the time Carafa was Bishop of Chieti. Chieti (Latin: Theate) is a city of the Abruzzi in Central Italy, from which the congregation adopted its specific name, to distinguish it from other congregations (Barnabites, Somaschi, Caracciolini, etc.) modelled upon it. The Theatines combined the pursuit of evangelical perfection traditional among religious orders with pastoral ministry generally expected of diocesan clergy. Their ideal was the reform and restoration of the clergy according to the model of the life of the Apostles, thereby edifying the laity and encouraging them in the practice of virtue.

The formal act of foundation took place on 14 September 1524, the feast of the Exaltation of the Holy Cross. On that day the first companions made solemn profession before the papal altar of St. Peter's Basilica in Rome, in the hands of the Bishop of Caserta, Giovanni Battista Bonziano, appointed as a special papal delegate. According to the terms of the papal brief, the office of superior general or provost was for a term of one year, renewable for a maximum of 3 years. Carafa was elected to be the first incumbent. General. It was he who also wrote the constitutions of the order.

The order was dedicated in a particular manner to the Cross of Christ, which was adopted as its emblem. The new companions, soon joined by others, founded oratories (among them the celebrated Divino Amore) and hospitals, devoted themselves to preaching the Gospel, and reformed lax morals. They were exclusive, aristocratic, and formidably austere. They wore the simple black cassock of the local clergy and maintained a modest lifestyle.

== Growth ==
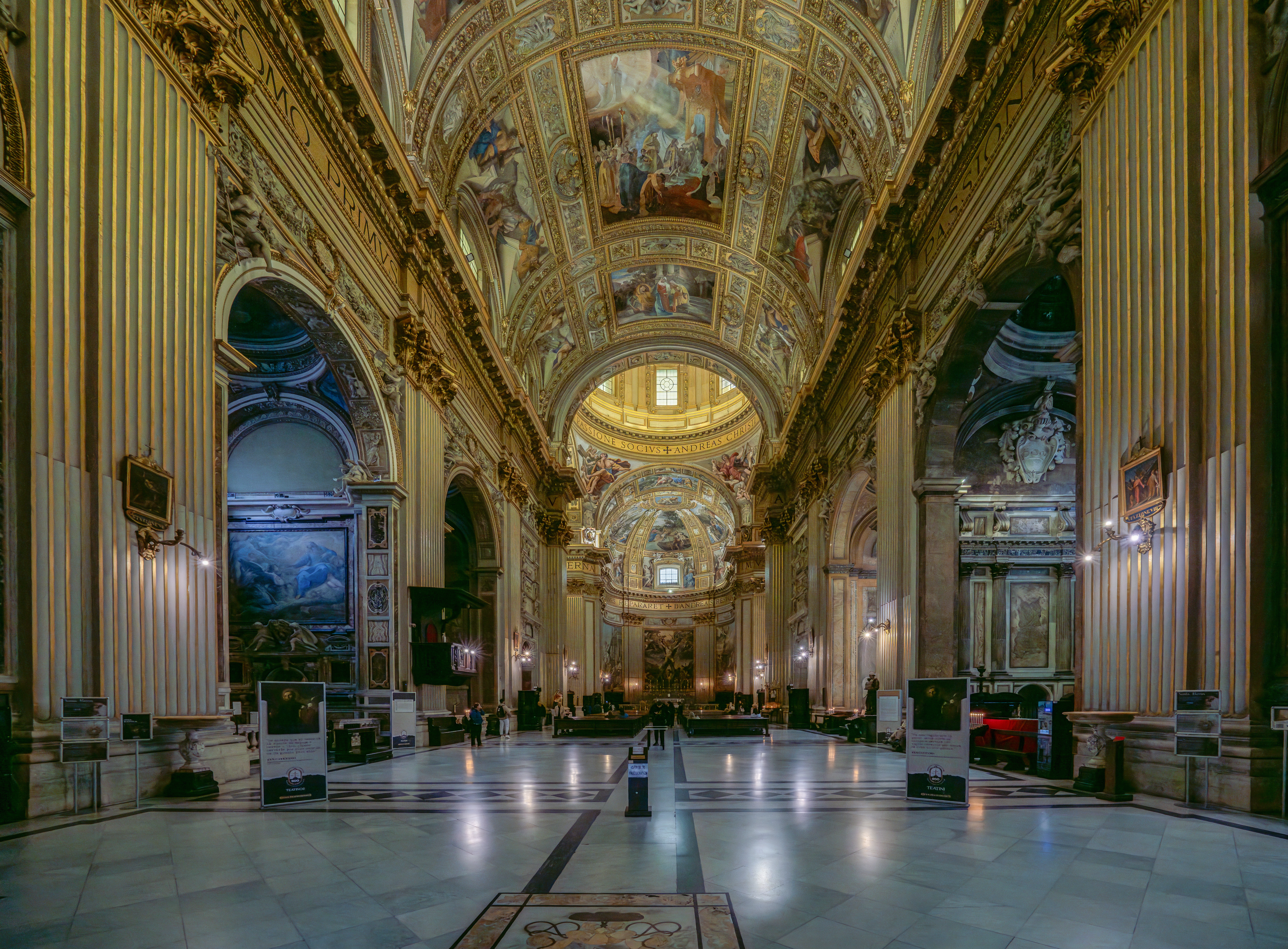
Sant'Andrea della Valle, Theatine church in Rome

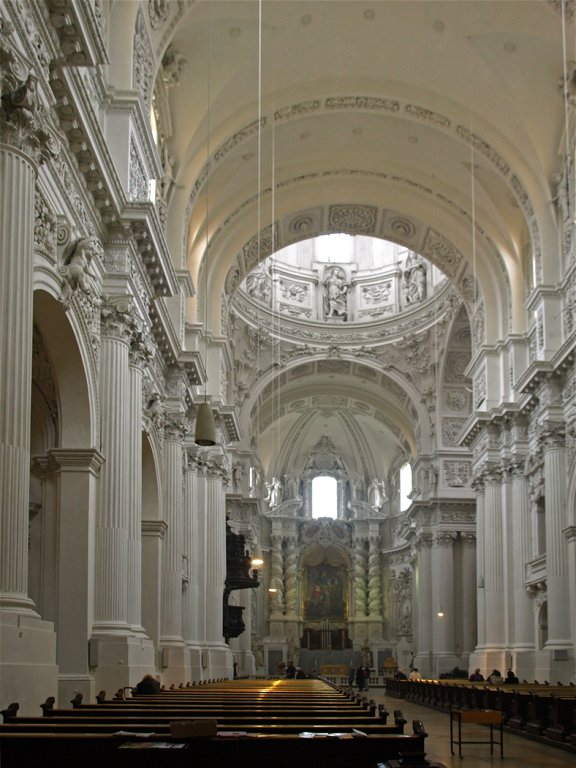
Theatine Church, Munich

The prohibition on both owning property and soliciting alms tended to limit applicants from members of the aristocracy, and so they remained relatively few in number. In 1546 they were briefly joined with the Somaschi Fathers, but as the object of the respective orders differed, they separated in 1555. In 1527 their house in Rome was sacked by the army of Charles V, and the Roman community sought refuge in Venice.

They founded many churches, among them the Sant'Andrea della Valle in Rome, a gift of Costanza Piccolomini D'Aragona, Duchess of Amalfi. This church is a masterpiece of Carlo Maderno and contains several paintings by Domenichino. The Theatines still operate the church.

In France, through the efforts of Cardinal Mazarin, they built the Church of St. Anne la Royale opposite the Louvre in 1644. In Spain, under Philip II, the Theatine Cardinal Paolo Burali d'Arezzo, filled various embassies at the command of the viceroy of Naples. In Portugal, John IV, in 1648, gave the Theatines a splendid house and college for the education of noble youth. In England, under Henry VIII, Thomas Goldwell, Bishop of St. Asaph, entered the order of Theatines. In Bavaria, the Theatine Church St. Kajetan was built from 1663 to 1690, founded by Elector Ferdinand Maria.

The Theatines were the first to found papal missions in: Golconda (in present-day India), Ava (Burma), Peru, Mingrelia (Georgia), founded by Andrea Borromeo, the East Indies, (the history of which was written by the Theatine Bartolomeo Ferro – "Missioni Teatine nelle Indie Orientali"), Arabia, and Armenia. In 1626 Theatines went to Persia.

Theatine manuscripts dating from 1530 until the end of the 18th century show there were missions established in a number of other countries. By 1700 the Theatines numbered 1400.

== Decline of the Order ==
By the end of the eighteenth century, decline had set in, exacerbated by political upheavals. General suppression of religious orders affected the Theatines more significantly because the order historically acquired no possessions and so had no institutional infrastructure.

Pope Pius X had a hand in attempts at revival, calling upon the services of Cardinal José de Calasanz Félix Santiago Vives y Tutó. The papal Motu Proprio Auspicato, of 15 December 1909, decreed the union of the Congregation of the Regular Theatine Clergy with the youthful Spanish Congregation of the Holy Family founded at Barcelona by Josep Manyanet y Vives, but the two groups were separated again in 1916. In 1910, the Theatines were amalgamated with the Congregation of Saint Alphonsus Liguori, which had been founded in Mallorca in 1867.

== Today ==
As of 2020, the Theatines had 161 members, of whom 124 are priests.

The Theatines are present in Argentina, Brazil, Colombia, Mexico, the Netherlands, Spain, and the United States of America, where they maintain a mission at Durango, Colorado.

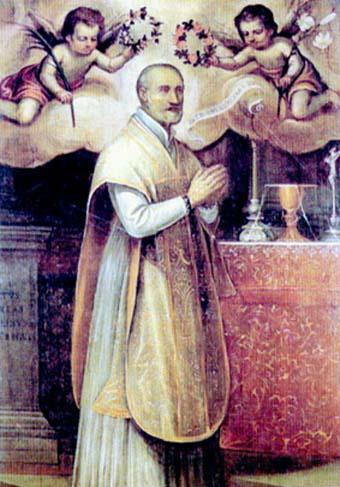
Andrew Avellino (1521–1608).

== Prominent members ==
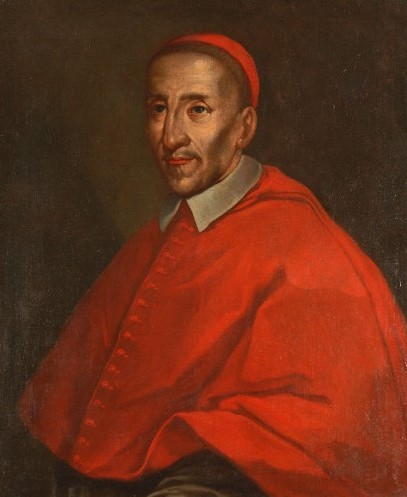
Giuseppe Maria Tomasi (1649–1713).

The Order has numbered among its members:

- Saints
  - Gaetano dei Conti di Thiene (6 October 1480 – 7 August 1547), founder of the Congregation, canonised on 12 April 1671
  - Andrea Avellino (c. 1521 – 10 November 1608), priest, canonised on 16 October 1690
  - Giuseppe Maria Tomasi (12 September 1649 – 1 January 1713), cardinal, canonised on 12 October 1986
- Blesseds
  - Giovanni Francesco Marinoni (25 December 1490 – 31 December 1562), priest, beatified on 5 December 1764
  - Paolo Burali d'Arezzo (c. 1511 – 17 June 1578), cardinal, beatified on 18 June 1772
- Venerables
  - Orsola Benincasa (20 October 1547 – 20 October 1618), founder of the Theatine Sisters of the Immaculate Conception, declared Venerable on 7 August 1793
  - Franceso Olimpio (5 August 1559 – 21 February 1639), priest, declared Venerable on 10 August 1783
  - Vincenzo Maria Morelli (25 April 1741 – 22 August 1812), Archbishop of Otranto, declared Venerable on 11 December 2019
- Servants of God
  - Giacomo Torno (c. 1539 – 18 January 1609), priest
  - Antonio Sagrera Gayá (31 October 1904 – 22 November 1992), priest
- Non-saints
  - Lorenzo Scupoli
  - Tommaso Del Bene
  - Guarino Guarini

It has also furnished one pope, Paul IV (Giovanni Pietro Carafa), 250 bishops, archbishops, and papal legates, and several cardinals.

Among noted 19th-century Theatines was the Sicilian Father Gioacchino Ventura dei baroni di Raulica, a philosopher, littérateur, and orator. One of his most celebrated works is his funeral oration on the death of Daniel O'Connell. The astronomer Giuseppe Piazzi (1746–1826), professor of mathematics and astronomy in Palermo, Sicily, discoverer of the first asteroid, Ceres, in 1801, became a Theatine at the age of 19.

== See also ==
- Blue Scapular of the Immaculate Conception

== Bibliography ==
- Bartolommeo Ferro, Istoria delle missioni de chierici regolari teatini 2 vols. (Roma 1705).
- Domenico Sangiacomo, Cenno storico sulla fondazione dell'ordine de' cc. rr. Teatini scritto in occasione di celebrarsi nella chiesa di S. Paolo di Napoli il terzo centenario dalla fondazione medesima (Napoli 1824).
- Gaetano Magenis, Vita di s. Gaetano Tiene fondatore de' chierici regolari e patriarca di tutto il regolare chiericato (Napoli 1845).
- Giuseppe Maria Ginelli, Memorie istoriche della vita di S. Gaetano Tiene, fondatore e patriarca de' Cherici (Venezia 1753).
- Herbert Vaughan, The Life of St. Cajetan: Count of Tiene, Founder of the Theatines (London : T. Richardson, 1888).
- Paul A. Kunkel, The Theatines in the History of Catholic Reform Before the Establishment of Lutheranism (Washington DC 1941).
