= Nicolaus von Weis =

German bishop (1796–1869)

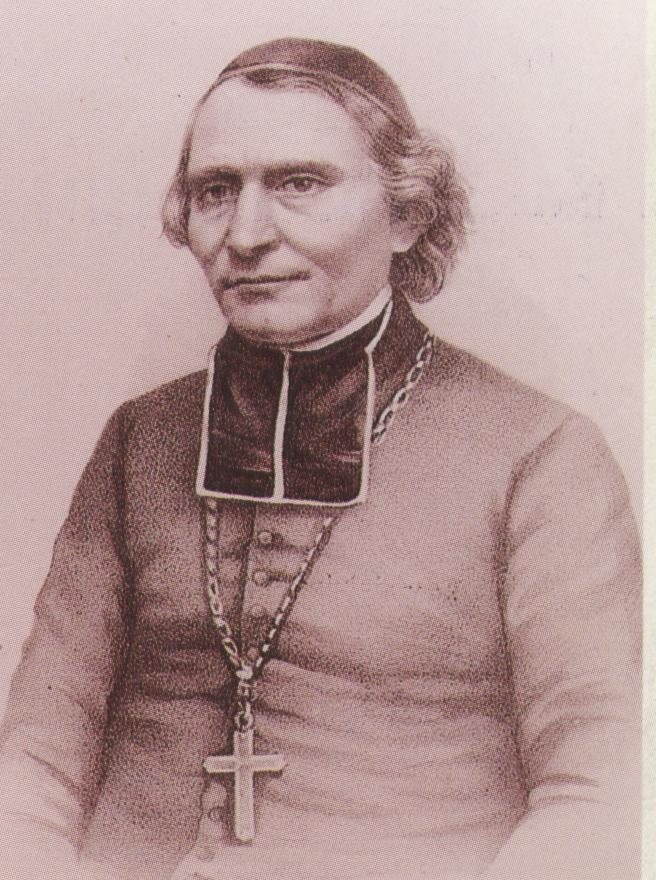
Bishop Nikolaus von Weis, litho

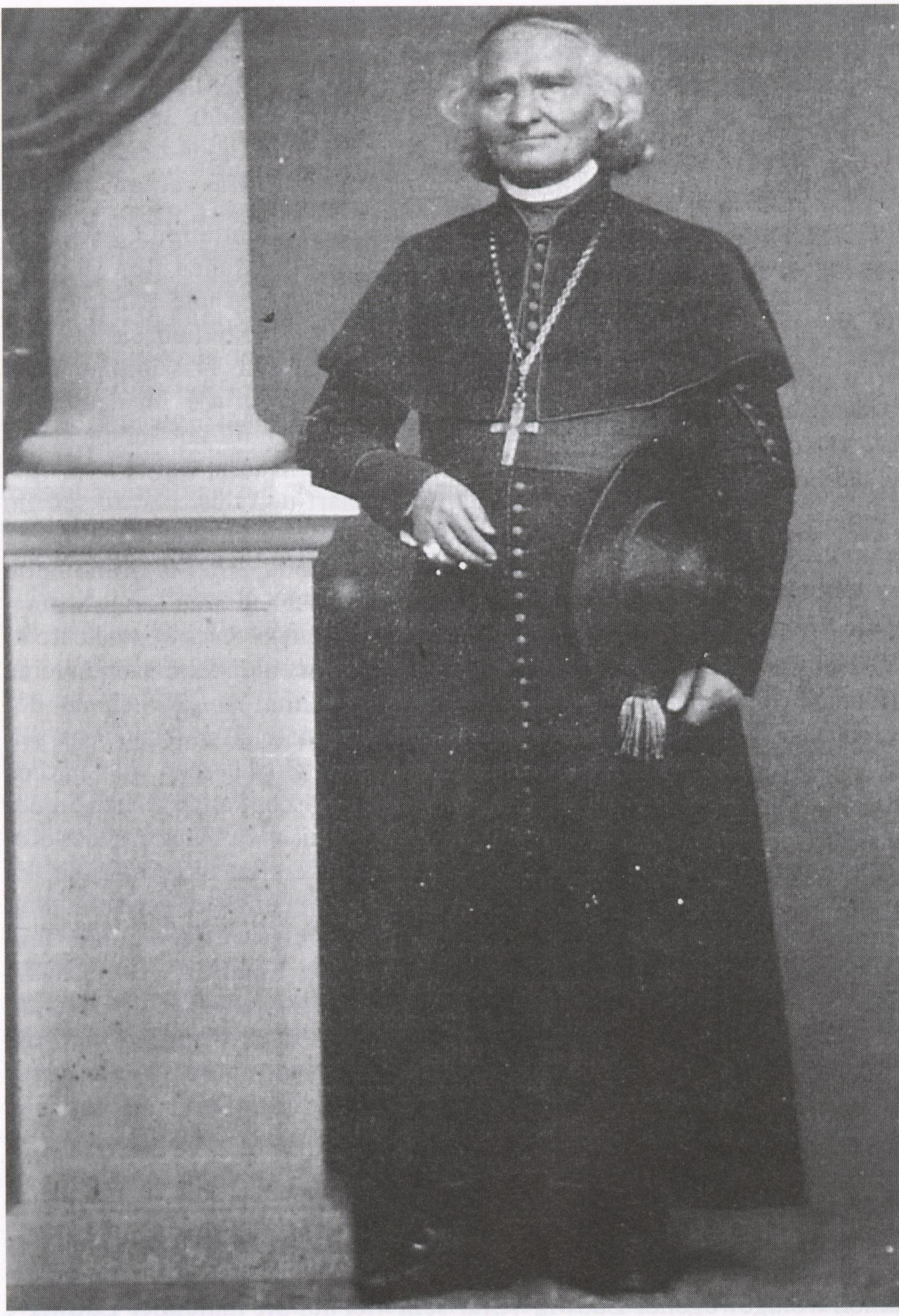
Bishop Nikolaus von Weis, photo

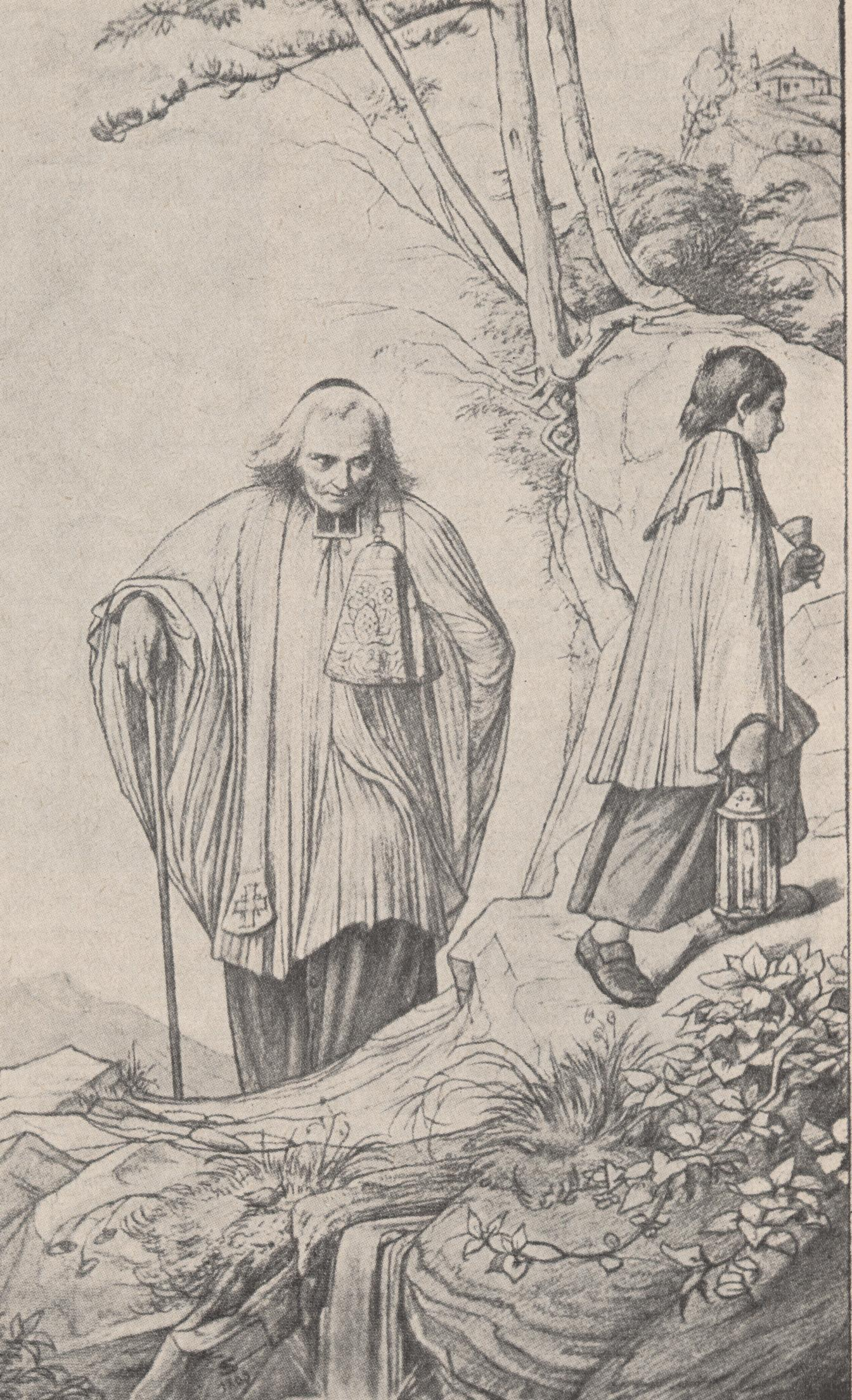
Eduard von Steinle, "Priest carries the Holy Sacrament over the mountains", with the face of Nikolaus von Weis

Nicolaus von Weis (born Rimling, Moselle, France, 8 March 1796 - died Speyer, 13 December 1869) was from 1842 to 1869 Bishop of the Roman Catholic Diocese of Speyer, in the Palatinate (in that time a district of the Kingdom of Bavaria.

== Life ==
His father was a shepherd and the poor German family lived in Lorraine, near the German border. After the early death of the father, his mother went back with the boy to Germany and he grew up in Altheim, now a part of Blieskastel, Saarland. He studied at the seminary at Mainz, when Bruno Franz Leopold Liebermann was regent, and was ordained 22 August 1818 by Bishop Joseph Ludwig Colmar. Hereupon he taught the humanities at the seminary (1818–20), was pastor at Dudenhofen (1820–22), canon at the Speyer Cathedral (1822–37), and dean of the cathedral (1837–42). During this time he was said to have displayed remarkable literary activity.

== Works ==
In conjunction with Andreas Rass, afterwards Bishop of Strasbourg, he revised, enlarged, and translated several apologetic, dogmatic, homiletic, and hagiographic works, the best known of which are an enlarged German edition of Butler's "Lives of the Saints" (24 vols., Mainz, 1821–27), translations from the French of Carron, Brillet, Picot, and others, and an extensive compilation of sermons by various authors. He founded the monthly review "Der Katholik" at Mainz, conjointly with Rass. He was its sole editor from 1827 to 1841. For some time it was one of the leading German Catholic monthly periodicals.

On 27 February 1842, he was nominated as successor to Bishop Geissel of Speyer who was his friend and seminary classmate. He was preconized, 23 May, consecrated at Munich by Archbishop Gebsattel on 10 July, and solemnly enthroned in the cathedral of Speyer on 20 July.

He laboured with what has been said to be great success for the advancement of Christian education among the faithful, promoted popular missions and pious ecclesiastical societies, introduced annual retreats for the priests of his diocese, and fostered religious orders, especially female teaching orders. His efforts to establish a theological seminary were said to have been frustrated by the Bavarian Government. During his pontificate the cathedral of Speyer was artistically frescoed by Johann Schraudolph (1846–53), and the renovation of its western front was completed (1858). He founded also monasteries and orphanages and is called the rebuilder of the modern Speyer Diocese after the refoundation in the year 1817. His charity for the poor and his hospitality were legendary. Therefore, the German novelist Conrad von Bolanden characterized him in his novel Die Aufgeklärten, 1864, as the "landlord of the golden cross, whom call the poor their father". The famous artist Eduard von Steinle painted the clergyman in his impressive work "Priest carries the Holy Sacrament over the mountains" with the face of his friend Nikolaus von Weis.

Bishop Nikolaus von Weis is buried in the Speyer Cathedral. In Speyer a street and a school are named after him; in Landstuhl a street, a school and an orphanage.
