= Staudenmaier =

Staudenmaier is a surname. Notable people with the surname include:

- Franz Anton Staudenmaier (1800–1856), German Catholic theologian
- Louis W. Staudenmaier (1906–1980), American lawyer, businessman, and politician
