= Johannes von Geissel =

German cardinal (1796–1864)

His Eminence Johannes von Geissel
- Cardinal, Archbishop of Cologne
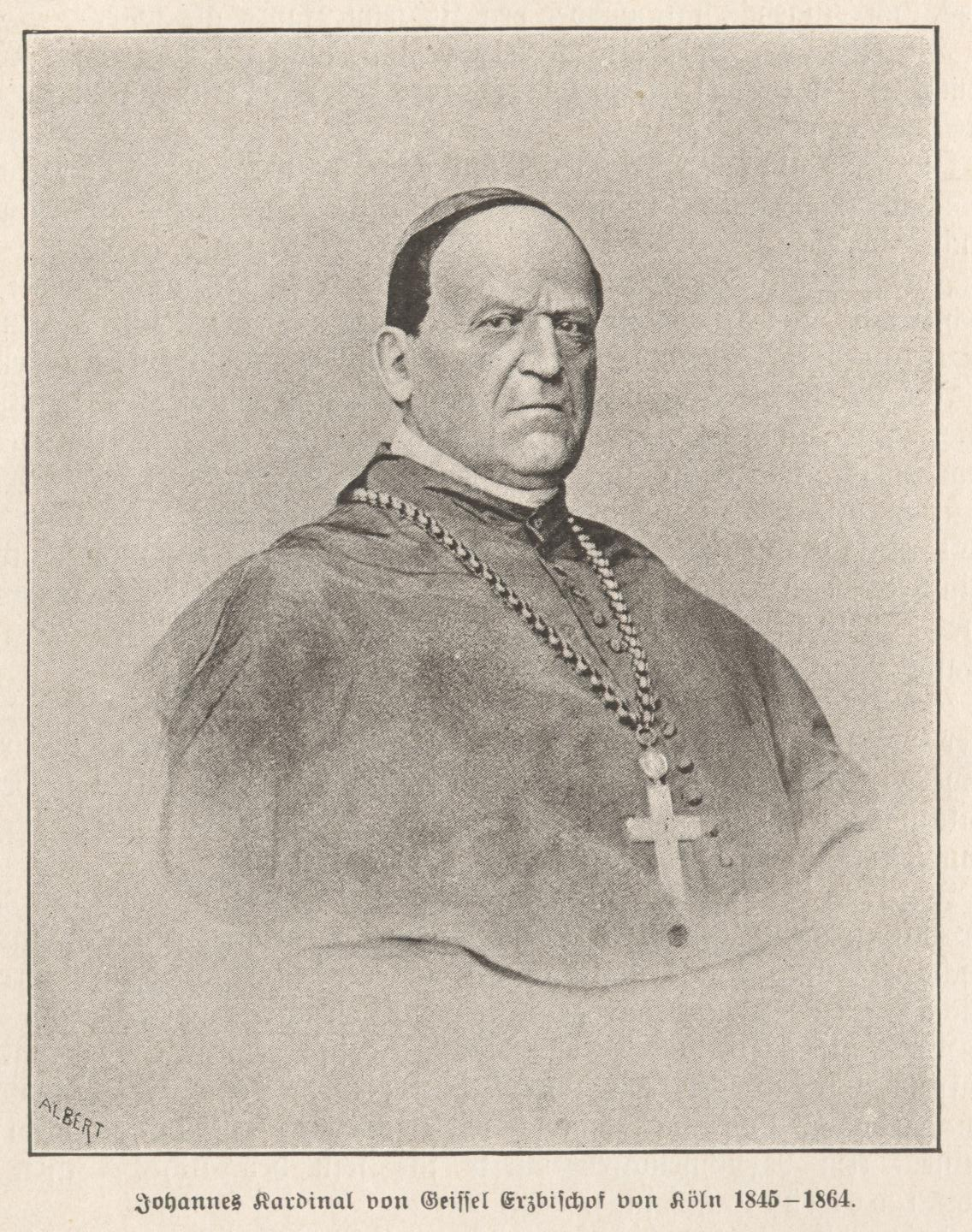
- Church: Roman Catholic
- Archdiocese: Cologne
- Installed: 24 November 1845
- Term ended: 8 September 1864
- Predecessor: Clemens August von Droste-Vischering
- Successor: Paul Melchers
- Other post: Cardinal-Priest of San Lorenzo in Panisperna
- Previous posts: Bishop of Speyer (1837-1841); Coadjutor Archbishop of Cologne (1841-1845)

Orders
- Ordination: 22 August 1818
- Consecration: 13 August 1837
- Created cardinal: 30 September 1850 by Pius IX
- Rank: Cardinal-Priest

Personal details
- Born: February 5, 1796 Gimmeldingen Germany
- Died: September 8, 1864 (aged 68) Cologne Germany
- Buried: Cologne Cathedral
- Parents: Nikolaus Geissel; Maria Motzenbäcker
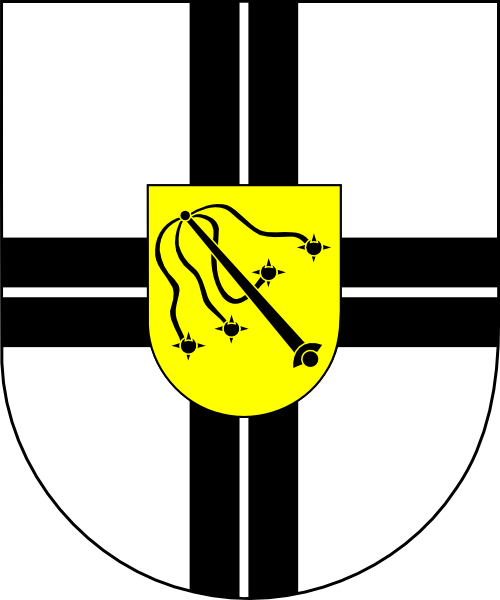
- Coat of arms

Johannes von Geissel (5 February 1796 – 8 September 1864) was a German Catholic Archbishop of Cologne and Cardinal from the Electorate of the Palatinate.

== Life ==
Geissel was born in Gimmeldingen in the Electorate of the Palatinate.

After completing his classical studies at Neustadt an der Weinstraße, and at Edesheim, he was received into the then imperial lycée of Mainz in 1813, and studied theology in the diocesan seminary of the same city, under Prof. Bruno Franz Leopold Liebermann, from 1815. He was ordained priest, 22 August 1818. For a short time he became assistant in the parish of Hambach an der Weinstraße.

On 1 February 1819, he was appointed professor at the Gymnasium of Speyer; on 24 June 1822, canon of the cathedral chapter of Speyer; and on 25 May 1836, dean of that body. Nominated Bishop of Speyer by the King of Bavaria, he was preconized by Pope Gregory XVI, 20 May 1837, and consecrated in Augsburg cathedral the following 13 August.

After the accession to the throne of Prussia of Frederick William IV, the "conflict of Cologne" was to be settled amicably by an agreement between Church and State, to the effect that Archbishop Clemens August von Droste-Vischering would relinquish the personal direction of the archdiocese, which should pass over to a coadjutor with the right of succession. On 24 September 1841, Gregory XVI appointed Geissel coadjutor to the Archbishop of Cologne; and on 4 March 1842, he entered upon the administration of the archdiocese. When Clemens August died (19 October 1845), Geissel succeeded him, and was enthroned as archbishop, 11 January 1846. Finally, Pope Pius IX created him cardinal, 30 September 1850.

Discretion and a sense of justice on the part of the government of Frederick William IV made it possible for the cardinal to regulate and ameliorate the conditions of the archdiocese in harmony with the policy of the State. He ended the dissensions created by the Hermesian School by suspending the refractory Hermesian professors Braun and Achterfeldt of Bonn; and he reorganized the theological faculty of that university by calling in as professors the orthodox Dieringer and Martin. He established two seminaries for boys at Neuss and Münstereifel. He encouraged popular missions, introduced religious orders and congregations into the archdiocese, instituted the Perpetual Adoration, and stimulated devotion to the Blessed Virgin by celebrating with unusual splendour the declaration of the dogma of the Immaculate Conception.

He convoked the German episcopate to the Würzburg Bishops' Conference in 1848; in 1860 he held a provincial council at Cologne. Geissel lived long enough to see Cologne Cathedral finally completed and dedicated in October, 1863. He died in Cologne the following year.

== Works ==
During the first two decades of its existence (1821–37) he contributed numerous anonymous essays of either serious or humorously-satirical character on questions and occurrences of the day to the Katholik. His unusual poetical talent is shown by a number of poems, mostly of a religious character, and published partly in that periodical, partly issued singly, as the occasion offered. After his death there appeared a special edition of his "Festgedicht auf die Grundsteinlegung zum Fortbau des Kölner Doms" (Cologne, 1865). However, his most marked effort as a writer is his historical work, "Der Kaiser-Dom zu Speyer. Eine topographisch-historische Monographie" (3 vols., Mainz, 1828); 2nd ed. in one volume, as Vol. IV of his "Schriften und Reden" (Cologne, 1876).

Other writings are in "Schriften und Reden von Johannes Cardinal von Geissel, Erzbischof von Köln, herausgegeben von Karl Theodor Dumont" (Vols. I-III, Cologne, 1869–70); later on vol. IV was added, "Der Kaiserdom zu Speyer", 2nd ed. (1876).

== See also ==
Catholic Church titles
Preceded by Peter von Richarz	Bishop of Speyer; 1837–1841	Succeeded by Nicolaus von Weis
Preceded by Clemens August II	Archbishop of Cologne; 1845–1864	Succeeded by Paul Melchers
New title New Creation	Chairman of the Würzburg Conference of Bishops; 1848	Vacant Title next held by Paul Melchers new bishops' conference formed in 1867
