= Andrea Borromeo =

Andrea Borromeo (c. 1615 – 2 January 1683) was an Italian Theatine priest and missionary.

A member of the noble House of Borromeo, he was one of the thirteen children of Giulio Cesare III Borromeo (1593–1638) and Giovanna Cesi (died 1672).

In 1652 he went to Mingrelia in Georgia as a missionary. He worked there for more than a decade and left an account of the region and the missions of his order entitled: "Relazione della Georgia, Mingrelia, e Missione de’ Padri Teatini in quelle parti" which was published in Rome in 1704.

On his return to Rome he was elected procurator for the missions he had established while declining the offer of a bishopric.

After seven days of a malignant fever brought on by a urinary disorder, Andrea Borromeo died in Rome at 7 pm on Saturday 2 January 1683.
