= Joseph Ludwig Colmar =

German Catholic Bishop

- Bishop of Mainz
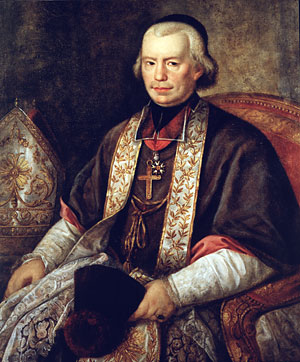
- Church: Catholic Church
- Diocese: Diocese of Mainz
- In office: 7 August 1802 – 15 December 1818
- Predecessor: Friedrich Karl Joseph von Erthal
- Successor: Joseph Vitus Burg

Orders
- Ordination: 20 December 1783
- Consecration: 24 August 1802 by Charles Mannay

Personal details
- Born: 22 June 1760 Strasbourg, Province of Alsace, Kingdom of France
- Died: 15 December 1818 (aged 58) Mainz, Grand Duchy of Hesse, German Confederation

Joseph Ludwig Colmar (born at Strasburg, 22 June 1760; died at Mainz, 15 December 1818) was a French Catholic Bishop of Mainz.

== Life ==
After his ordination (20 December 1783) he was professor of history and Greek at the Royal Seminary, and curate at St. Stephen's, Strasbourg. During the reign of terror, brought about at Strasbourg by the apostate monk, Eulogius Schneider, he secretly remained in the city, and administered the sacraments. After the fall of Robespierre he went about preaching and instructing.

Napoleon appointed him Bishop of Mainz after the Concordat of 1801; he was consecrated at Paris, 24 August 1802. The metropolitan see of St. Boniface had been vacant for ten years; the cathedral had been profaned and partially destroyed during the siege of Mainz in 1793; a new diocese had been formed under the old title of Mainz, but subject to the Archbishop of Mechelen; revolution, war, and secularization of convents, monasteries, and the property of the former archdiocese had affected his new diocese. Due to the fact that Mainz Cathedral lay partially in ruins St. Peter's was chosen for the inauguration of bishop Joseph Ludwig Colmar in 1803. Colmar rebuilt and reconsecrated the cathedral, and by his influence saved the Speyer Cathedral which was about to be destroyed by order of the Government.

He opened a seminary (1804), which he placed under the direction of the Venerable Liebermann; he visited parishes and school, and reorganized the religious structure which the Revolution had swept away. He was an active adversary of Wessenberg and the rationalistic liberal tendencies represented by him and the Illuminati. He tried to reintroduce several religious communities in his diocese, but accomplished, however, only the restoration of the Institute of Mary Ward (Dames Anglaises). Shortly before his death he established the sisters of Divine Providence in the Bavarian part of his diocese (the former Diocese of Speyer).

During the epidemic of 1813 and 1814, after the Battle of Leipzig, he personally served the sick and dying. Colmar edited a collection of old German church hymns (1807) and several prayer books. His sermons were published in seven volumes (Mainz, 1836; Ratisbon, 1879).
