= Borromean clinic =

The Borromean clinic is a model of psychoanalytic practice advanced in the late work of Jacques Lacan. It takes its name from the Borromean knot.

The Lacanian model describes the 3 rings that make up that knot at the Imaginary, the Symbolic, and the Real. The interconnectedness of all 3 is crucial to perceiving reality accurately, and cutting the ties of a single ring causes the others to also become disconnected, resulting in a disturbed perception of reality and possibly psychosis.

In 1975, Jacques Lacan added a fourth ring to his theory which the conclusion that the fourth ring was responsible for locking up the psyche. Jacques was also a strong believer in Sigmund Freud's work and was heavily influenced by Freud's original work in psychoanalytic theory.
