= Georg Hermes =

German Roman Catholic theologian (1775–1831)

Georg Hermes (22 April 1775, Dreierwalde – 26 May 1831, Bonn) was a German Roman Catholic theologian who advocated a rational approach to theology. During his lifetime, his theology was greatly in vogue in Germany, but declined after the posthumous papal condemnation of "Hermesianism" by Pope Gregory XVI.

== Life ==
Born at Dreierwalde, in Westphalia, Hermes was educated at the gymnasium (high school) in Rheine and the University of Münster.

In 1797 Hermes became professor at the Münster gymnasium; in 1799 he was ordained a priest. The first work he wrote, Untersuchung über die innere Wahrheit des Christentums (Münster, 1805), in which he sought to demonstrate the harmony between reason and revelation, was received with so much favour that in 1807 its author, warmly commended by the Protestant theologian August Hermann Niemeyer, at Halle, was appointed to a chair of theology at the University of Münster.

Hermes lectured on dogmatic theology, and, with especial zeal, on the introduction to theology. He earned the respect and appreciation of his colleagues by his devotion to the interests of the university; up to 1819 they elected him dean three times.

In 1820, he was appointed professor of theology at Bonn. Hermes was highly esteemed by his students and had a devoted group of adherents, of whom the most notable was Peter Josef Elvenich (1796–1886), who became professor at Breslau in 1829. Hermes died in Bonn 26 May 1831.

== Works ==
His works were Untersuchung über die innere Wahrheit des Christentums (Münster, 1805), and Einleitung in die christkatholische Theologie, of which the first part, a philosophical introduction, was published in 1810, the second part, on positive theology, in 1829. The Einleitung was never completed. His Christkatholische Dogmatik was published, from his lectures, after his death, by two of his students, Johann Heinrich Achterfeldt and Joseph Braun (5 vols, 1831–1834).

=== Einleitung ===
The Einleitung had a major and controversial effect upon Catholic theology in Germany. Hermes himself was very largely influenced by Immanuel Kant and Johann Gottlieb Fichte, and although in the philosophical portion of his Einleitung he strongly criticizes both these thinkers, rejecting their doctrine of the moral law as the sole guarantee for the existence of God, and condemning their restricted view of the possibility and nature of revelation, enough remained of purely speculative material to render his system controversial. Having closely studied Kant's philosophy, he occupied himself in refuting the doctrines of that philosopher so far as they were inconsistent with the Roman Catholic faith, while insisting that the truth of Christian revelation and of the Catholic church should first be tested by reason, and that revelation should then be followed. He argued that faith is a response to irresistible evidence, and therefore, not free.

After his death, the contests between his followers and their opponents grew so bitter that the dispute was referred to the Papal See. The judgment was negative; on 25 September 1835 a papal bull issued by Pope Gregory XVI, Dum Acerbissimas, condemned both parts of the Einleitung and the first volume of the Dogmatik. Two months later, the remaining volumes of the Dogmatik were likewise condemned. The controversy did not cease. In 1845, a systematic attempt was made anonymously by FX Werner to examine and refute the Hermesian doctrines, as contrasted with the orthodox Catholic faith (Der Hermesianismus, 1845). In 1847, the condemnation of 1835 was confirmed by Pius IX.

== Sources ==
- Karl Werner (1866). Geschichte der katholischen Theologie. pp. 405ff.
- Herman H. Schwedt (1980). Das Römische Urteil über Georg Hermes (1775–1831). Ein Beitrag zur Geschichte der Inquisition im 19. Jahrhundert. Herder: Rome
