= Missa brevis in B-flat =

2014 mass by Christopher Tambling

Missa brevis in B♭
- Mass by Christopher Tambling
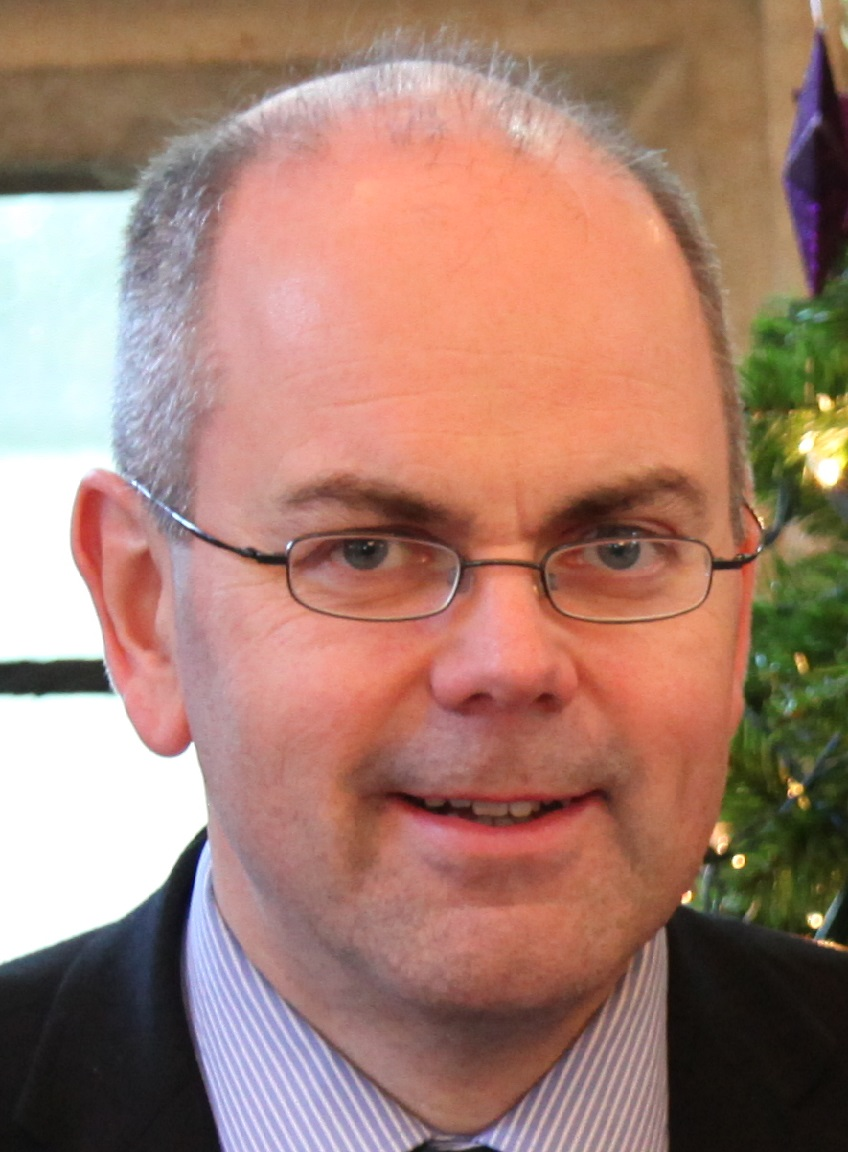
- The composer in 2011
- Key: B♭ major
- Text: Mass ordinary
- Language: Latin
- Composed: 2013
- Performed: 28 September 2014
- Published: 2014
- Movements: six
- Vocal: SATB choir (tenor optional)
- Instrumental: organ; ad lib.: brass and tubular bells

The Missa brevis in B♭ (German: Missa brevis in B) is a mass in B♭ major by the English composer Christopher Tambling on a commission from the Diocese of Speyer for its annual meeting of church musicians. He composed it in 2013 for mixed choir and organ, with optional parts for tenor voices, brass instruments and tubular bells. It was named a missa brevis on publication, for its brevity, but is also referred to as Missa in B. The piece was first performed and published in 2014.

== Background and history ==
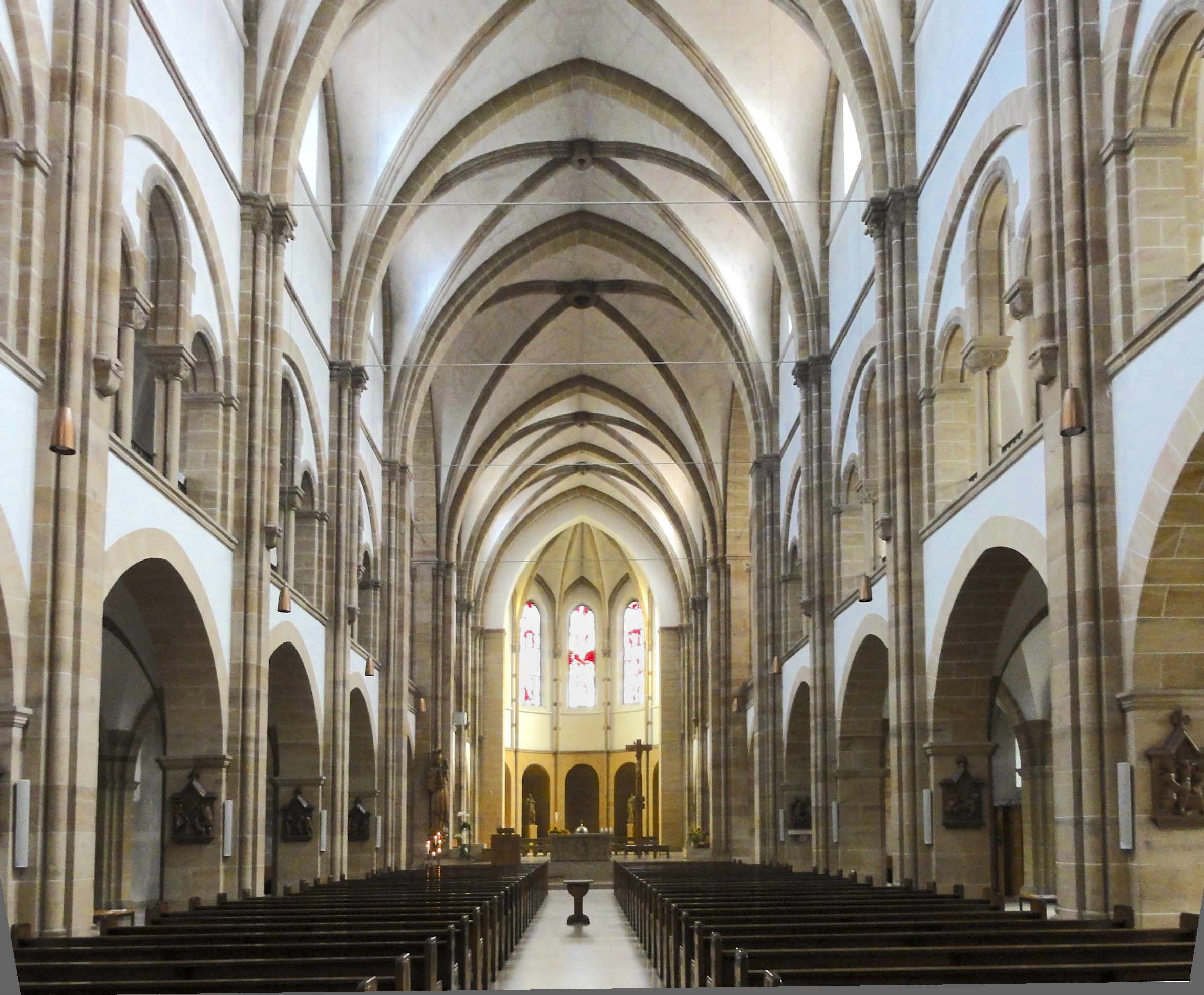
Interior of St. Maria where the mass was first performed

Tambling, a church musician and music pedagogue, was described as "a great believer in making church music accessible". He was commissioned to compose a mass for the 28th Diözesankirchenmusiktag of the Diocese of Speyer by its department of church music and the regional Cäcilienverband (DCV). The work, the Missa brevis in B, was first performed at the meeting of church musicians from all over the diocese on 28 September 2014 at St. Maria in Landau by around 1,400 singers. It was first published that year by Dr. J. Butz, with a dedication on the occasion of the 10th anniversary of the DCV to the church choirs of the diocese and bishops Karl-Heinz Wiesemann and Anton Schlembach.

== Music ==
The mass is structured in six movements:

1. Kyrie (Moderato)
2. Gloria (Con spirito)
3. Credo (Moderato)
4. Sanctus (Giocoso)
5. Benedictus (Andante moderato)
6. Agnus Dei (Moderato molto)

The work sets the complete text of the Latin mass, but is called a missa brevis (short mass) because of its brevity, of around 16 minutes. Tambling wrote the music with the possibility to adapt it to different ensembles. The most modest group that can perform it is a three-part choir SAB with organ accompaniment, and the largest is a four-part choir SATB with parts for two trumpets and two trombones, tubular bells and organ. The congregation is requested to sing Gregorian chant in the Credo which alternates with choral passages. For much of the mass, the tenor part is the same as the bass. In four-part writing, altos or basses can sing short passages when no tenors are available.

== Performances ==
The premiere performance was held at the 28th Diözesankirchenmusiktag of the Diocese of Speyer at St. Maria St. Maria in Landau on 28 September 2014 by singers from 60 choirs of the diocese. Markus Eichenlaub, Kirchenmusikdirektor of the diocese, conducted the singers with a brass ensemble, tubular bells and organ. A local review reported more than 1.300 singers, while a preview mentioned 1,400 singers who had signed up for the day, a figure reported also in Tambling's obituaries.

The mass, like Tambling's other sacred music, is popular in Germany. It was performed in the service for Christmas Eve at the Münster Cathedral in 2015. The Cäcilienverein of Triengen, Switzerland, performed and recorded it for Pentecost in 2017. The mass was performed at the Trier Cathedral for the opening mass of the pilgrimage Heilig-Rock-Tage in 2018, together with the world premiere of a composition commissioned for the event. The birthday of the city of Munich is regularly celebrated with the Bennofest, a feast around the Frauenkirche, on 9 June 2022 with a performance of the mass in a service with Cardinal Reinhard Marx. At the Speyer Cathedral, the Gloria was scheduled for Pentecost Sunday of 2023, and the complete mass for the last Sunday before summer vacation.
