= Rüdiger Huzmann =

German bishop

- Bishop of Speyer
- Diocese: Roman Catholic Diocese of Speyer
- Appointed: 1075
- In office: 1075–1090
- Predecessor: Heinrich of Scharfenberg
- Successor: Johann I of Kraichgau
- Previous post: Head of the cathedral school

Personal details
- Died: 22 February 1090 Speyer
- Denomination: Roman Catholic

Rüdiger Huzmann (died 22 February 1090) was a German religious leader who served as the Roman Catholic Bishop of Speyer from 1075 to his death. He was born into an old Speyer family with Salian connections and before c. 1065 became a canon at Speyer Cathedral and head of the Speyer cathedral school.

During the Investiture Controversy, he was a strong supporter of King Henry IV, who appointed Huzmann as Bishop of Speyer in 1075. After the 1076 Synod of Worms, Huzmann aided Henry in his efforts to depose Pope Gregory VII, who twice suspended and excommunicated Huzmann.

Speyer thrived under the rule of Huzmann. In 1084, he welcomed a Jewish community who had left Mainz after a fire, granting them a protective charter which gave the community some business rights and some limited self-rule. The charter was confirmed by the emperor shortly before Huzmann's death.

== Life ==
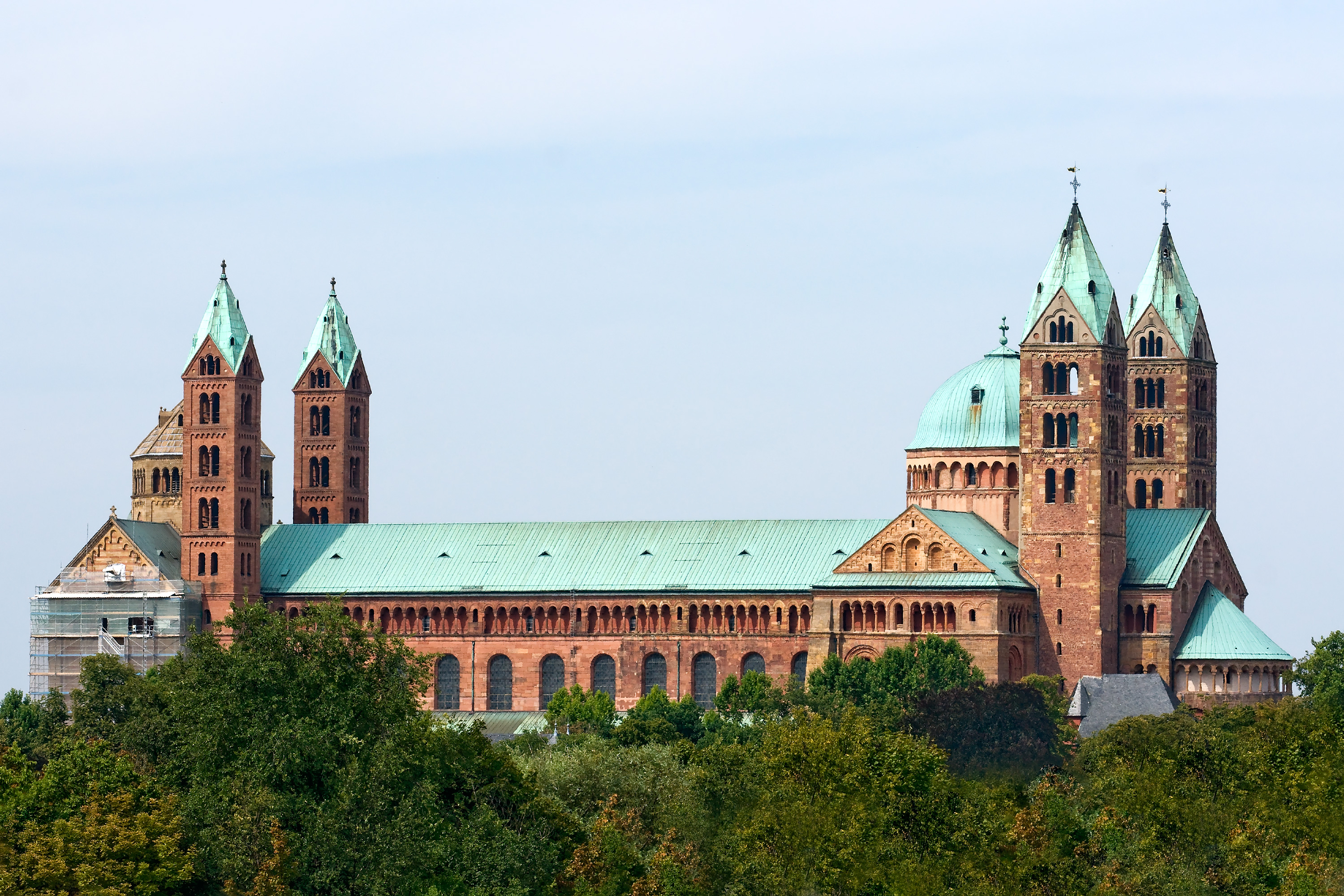
Speyer Cathedral

Not much is known about the early life of Huzmann, who is also known as Huozmann or Hutzmann. He came from an old Speyer family with connections to the Salians. Before c. 1065, he became head of the Cathedral school in Speyer and as canon a dignitary of the cathedral chapter. The school had become renowned under Benno, who led it until 1048, and continued to be an important spiritual centre.

Huzmann's predecessor as bishop of Speyer, Heinrich of Scharfenberg, who was called to the 1075 Synod of Lent in Rome, where he was suspended in absentia, died either on 29 December 1074 or on 26 February 1075. At the Synod, Pope Gregory VII outlawed the practice of bishops being chosen by anyone but the pope, deepening the Investiture Controversy. King Henry IV appointed Huzmann soon after, in April or May 1075.

== Role in the Investiture Controversy ==
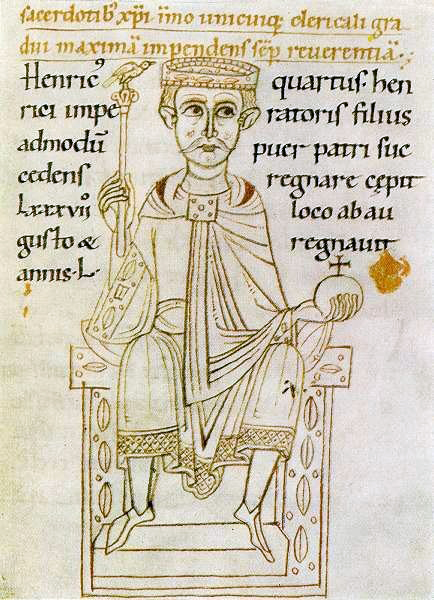
Henry IV, Holy Roman Emperor

Huzmann strongly supported Henry IV in the Investiture Controversy. At the Synod of Worms on 24 January 1076, he was one of the signatories of Henry's letter attacking Pope Gregory VII, declaring the pope as deposed. Together with bishop Burchard of Basel, Huzmann travelled to Italy with the intent of delivering Henry's letter to the pope in Rome. In February 1076, they met with an assembly of Italian bishops in Piacenza, who also signed statements of disobedience against the pope. Instead of continuing to Rome, Burchard and Huzmann sent the letter with a messenger. On receipt of the letter, Pope Gregory excommunicated archbishop of Mainz Siegfried I and Henry IV and threatened all signatories with suspension, giving them until 1 August to justify their actions to Rome. Although this meant he would be excommunicated, Huzmann stayed loyal to the king. He stayed at Oppenheim with Henry while the supporters of Gregory, who were asking for the king to seek absolution and the revocation of his excommunication, met on the opposite side of the Rhine at Trebur. After lengthy negotiations, Henry had to dismiss the bishops and princes that had been loyal to him, including Huzmann, and the king stayed in Speyer before embarking on the Road to Canossa. Huzmann travelled to Rome, where Gregory absolved him, but he was imprisoned in a monastery for a while and remained suspended as bishop. He returned to Speyer in 1077 and was reinstated as bishop by Pope Gregory on 19 March 1078.

When Gregory VII excommunicated Henry IV again at a synod at Lent 1080, Huzmann again supported the king, who decided with an assembly in Mainz to depose Gregory and to elect a new pope. Huzmann sent a letter to the bishops and princes of Lombardy, and soon after a synod in Brixen deposed Gregory. Wibert of Ravenna was nominated as Pope Clement III. Gregory reaffirmed the excommunication on Henry, which also extended to his supporters like Huzmann, in February 1081. However, this had little effect on Huzmann's standing in Speyer, as the city was loyal to him and to Henry, and he did not make any further attempts at reconciliation with Gregory. Huzmann was one of the negotiators for Henry during 1081 in the Great Saxon Revolt. In 1084, Clement III was consecrated as pope, and Henry IV was crowned Holy Roman Emperor. Gregory was forced to leave Rome and died in 1085. After Gregory's death, Henry was recognised as the legitimate king even in Saxony. Huzmann continued to be loyal to Henry, who met with him at Speyer in 1086, 1087 and 1090.

== Speyer under Huzmann ==
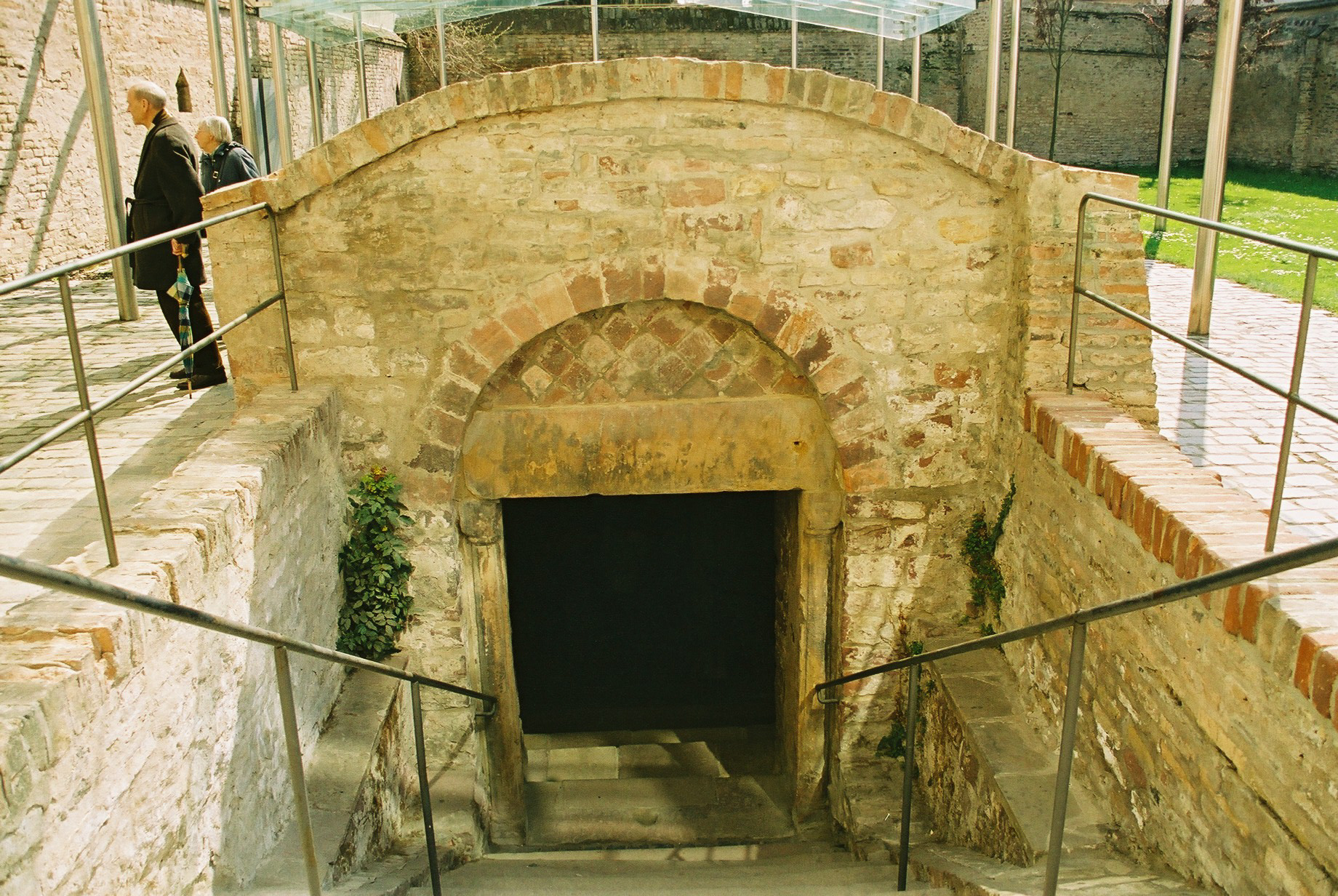
Entrance steps to the medieval mikveh in Speyer

Speyer flourished under Huzmann's rule. The Emperor supported Speyer Cathedral, which has several Salian dynasty tombs in its crypt, including Henry's parents and grandparents. In June 1075, Henry IV gave control of the Cyriakusstift Eschwege convent to the Prince-Bishopric of Speyer and allowed the bishop to appoint the abbess. In addition to several other estates and abbeys, some of them in Saxony or Hesse, he also gifted two counties to the Prince-Bishopric, Lutramsforst and Forchheim.

In 1084, a Jewish community was founded in Speyer. After a fire in Mainz, some of the Jewish inhabitants left that city, and Huzmann welcomed their arrival and issued a chartered letter of protection dated 13 September 1084. Huzmann intended to grow the economy and status of Speyer and built a wall around the new Jewish quarter in order to protect its inhabitants. He granted business rights and allowed the community to organise its own affairs, and declared the legal protections given by his charter as more generous than those found anywhere in Germany. In a Hebrew account from a 12th-century Speyer Jew, the bishop is praised and it is said, "he pitied us as a man pitied his son." The charter was affirmed by the emperor in 1090, who clarified and extended some of the privileges and added a firm protection against forced baptism. Huzmann died shortly after this, on 22 February 1090.

== Sources ==
- Blumenthal, Uta-Renate (3 August 2010). The Investiture Controversy. University of Pennsylvania Press. doi:10.9783/9780812200164. ISBN 978-0-8122-0016-4.
- Böhmer, Johann Friedrich; Struve, Tilman; Lubich, Gerhard; Jäckel, Dirk (2010). Regesta Imperii III. Salisches Haus 1024-1125. Tl. 2: 1056-1125. 3. Abt.: Die Regesten des Kaiserreichs unter Heinrich IV. 1056 (1050) - 1106. 2. Lief.: 1065 - 1075. Regesta Imperii. Vol. 2. Köln [u.a.]
- Böhmer, Johann Friedrich; Struve, Tilman; Lubich, Gerhard; Jäckel, Dirk (2016). Regesta Imperii III. Salisches Haus 1024-1125. Tl. 2: 1056-1125. 3. Abt.: Die Regesten des Kaiserreichs unter Heinrich IV. 1056 (1050) - 1106. 3. Lief.: 1076 - 1085. Regesta Imperii. Vol. 2. Köln [u.a.]
- Chazan, Robert (1980). Church, State, and Jew in the Middle Ages. Behrman House, Inc. ISBN 978-0-87441-302-1.
- Chazan, Robert (1987). European Jewry and the First Crusade. Berkeley : University of California Press. ISBN 978-0-520-05566-7.
- Geissel, Johannes von (1876). Der Kaiserdom zu Speyer; mit besonderer Rücksichtnahme auf die Geschichte der Bischöfe von Speyer. Köln: J.P. Bachem.
- Gugumus, Johannes Emil (1951). "Die Speyerer Bischöfe im Investiturstreit. Forschungen zu Problemen über das Verhältnis von Kirche und Staat im ausgehenden 11. Jahrhundert". Archiv für mittelrheinische Kirchengeschichte. 3: 77–144.
- Gugumus, Johannes Emil (1974). "Hu(o)zmann, Rüdiger". Neue Deutsche Biographie (in German). Vol. 10. Berlin: Duncker & Humblot. pp. 108–108. (full text online).
- Heidrich, Ingrid (1988). "Beobachtungen zur Stellung der Bischöfe von Speyer im Konflikt zwischen Heinrich IV. und den Reformpäpsten". Frühmittelalterliche Studien. 22: 266–285. doi:10.1515/9783110242201.266. S2CID 201732645.
- Heil, Johannes (2002). ""Deep enmity" and/or "Close ties"? Jews and Christians before 1096: Sources, Hermeneutics, and Writing History in 1996". Jewish Studies Quarterly. 9 (3): 259–306. doi:10.1628/0944570022728208. ISSN 0944-5706. JSTOR 40753311.
- Remling, Franz Xaver (1852). Geschichte der Bischöfe zu Speyer (in German). Mainz: Kirchheim und Schott.
