= Bishop of Speyer =

- Bishopric

catholic
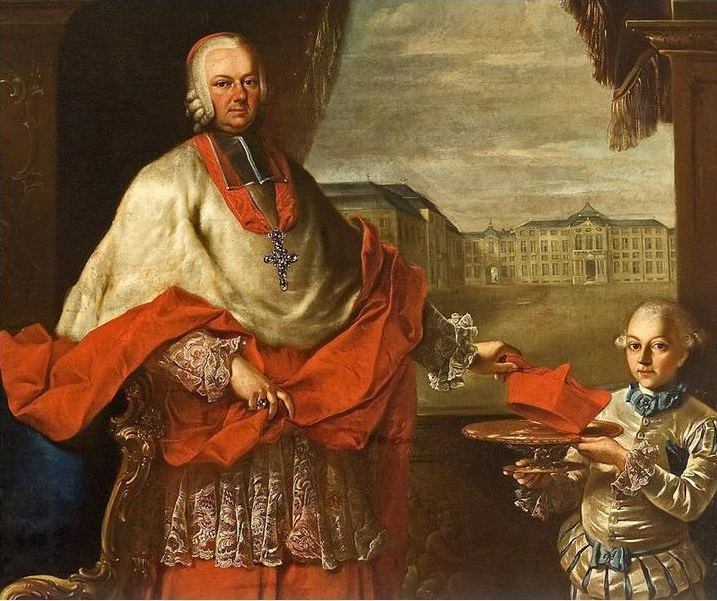
- Franz Christoph von Hutten zum Stolzenberg, prince-bishop of Speyer
- Incumbent vacant 19 August 2026

Location
- Country: Germany

Information
- Established: 1802
- Archdiocese: Bamberg
- Diocese: Speyer

The Bishop of Speyer is the Ordinary of the Roman Catholic Diocese of Speyer, which is a suffragan see of the Archdiocese of Bamberg. The diocese covers an area of 5,893 km². The most recent bishop was Karl-Heinz Wiesemann.

Listed here are the bishops of the diocese and auxiliary bishops.

== Bishops to 1802 ==
At some point, the bishops of Speyer acquired imperial fiefs.

Name	From	Until
Jesse of Speir	circa 346	
Hildericus episcopus	circa 613	
Atanasius	610	650
Principius	650	659
Dragobodo	659	700
Otto	700	709
Siegwin I	709	725
Luido	725	743
David	743	760
Basinus	760	775
Siegwin II	775	802
Otto I	802	810
Fraido	810	814
Benedikt	814	828 or 830
Bertin, also Hertinus	828 or 830	845 or 846
Gebhard I	845 or 847	880
Goddank	881	895 or 898
Einhard, also Eginhard	895 or 898	913
Bernhard	914	922
Amalrich	913 or 923	943
Reginwalt I, also Reginhard	943 or 944	950
Gottfried I	950	960
Otgar	960	970
Balderich	970	987
Ruprecht	987	1004
Walter	1004	1031
Siegfried I	1031	1032
Reinher, also Reginher	1032	1033
Reginhard II of Dillingen, also Reginbald	1033	1039
Sigbodo I, also Siegbodo	1039	1051
Arnold I of Falkenberg	1051	1056
Konrad I	1056	1060
Eginhard II of Katzenelnbogen	1060	1067
Heinrich of Scharfenberg	1067	1075
Rüdiger Huzmann (Huozmann, Hutzmann)	1075	1090
Johann I of Kraichgau	1090	1104
Gebhard II, Count of Urach	1105	1107 († 1110)
Bruno, Count of Saarbrücken (Count of Saargau)	1107	1123
Arnold II, Count of Leiningen	1124	1126
Siegfried I, Count of Wolffölden	1127	1146
Günther von Henneberg	1146	1161
Ulrich I of Dürrmenz	1161	1163
Gottfried II	1164	1167
Rabodo, Count of Lobdaburg	1167	1176
Konrad II	1176	1178
Ulrich II of Rechberg	1178	1187
Otto II, Count of Henneberg	1187	1200
Conrad III of Scharfenberg	1200	1224
Beringer of Entringen	1224	1232
Konrad IV of Dahn	1233	1236
Konrad V, Count of Eberstein	1237	1245
Heinrich II, Count of Leiningen	1245	1272
Friedrich of Bolanden	1272	1302
Sigibodo II of Lichtenberg, also Siegbodo	1302	1314
Emich, Count of Leiningen, also Emicho	1314	1328
Berthold, Count of Bucheck	1328	1328
Walram, Count of Veldenz	1328	1336
Baldwin, Archbishop of Trier (Administrator)	1332	1336
Gerhard of Ehrenberg	1336	1363
Lambert of Born (Brunn?)	1364	1371
Adolf I, Count of Nassau	1371	1388
Nikolaus I aus Wiesbaden	1388	1396
Raban of Helmstatt	1396	1438
Reinhard of Helmstatt	1438	1456
Siegfried III Freiherr of Venningen	1456	1459
Johann II Nix of Hoheneck, aka Enzenberger	1459	1464
Matthias Freiherr of Rammingen	1464	1478
Ludwig of Helmstädt	1478	1504
Philip I of Rosenberg	1504	1513
George, Count Palatine by Rhine	1513	1529
Philip II of Flersheim	1529	1552
Rudolf of Frankenstein	1552	1560
Marquard Freiherr of Hattstein	1560	1581
Eberhard of Dienheim	1581	1610
Philipp Christoph von Sötern	1610	1652
Lothar Friedrich of Metternich	1652	1675
Johann Hugo von Orsbeck	1675	1711
Heinrich Hartard of Rollingen	1711	1719
Hugo Damian of Schönborn	1719	1743
Franz Christoph of Hutten zu Stolzenberg	1743	1770
Damian August Philipp Karl, Count of Limburg-Stirum-Vehlen	1770	1797
Philipp Franz Wilderich of Walderdorf	1801	1802 († 1810)
Sede vacante	1802	1818
Secularization and division of the diocese	1803	

== Bishops after 1818 ==
Tenure	Incumbent	Notes
1802 to 5 February 1818	Sede vacante	Secularization and division of the bishopric of Speyer
5 February 1818 to 30 June 1826	Matthäus Georg von Chandelle	Priest of Mainz; ordained 9 December 1821; died in office
22 July 1826 to 25 March 1835	Johann Martin Manl	Priest of Mainz; confirmed 9 April 1827; ordained 25 April 1827; appointed Bishop of Eichstätt
23 March 1835 to 20 September 1836	Johann Peter von Richarz	Priest of Würzburg; confirmed 24 July 1835; ordained 1 November 1835; Appointed Bishop of Augsburg
20 September 1836 to 23 May 1842	Johannes von Geissel	Priest of Speyer; confirmed 19 May 1837; ordained 13 August 1837; Appointed Bishop of Cologne
5 March 1842 to 13 December 1869	Nicolaus von Weis	Priest of Speyer; confirmed 23 May 1842; ordained 10 July 1842; died in office
6 May 1870 to 4 April 1871	Konrad Reither	Priest of Speyer; confirmed 27 June 1870; ordained 18 September 1870; died in office
23 May 1872 to 31 May 1876	Bonifatius von Haneberg, OSB	Priest of the Order of Saint Benedict; confirmed 29 July 1872; ordained 25 August 1872; died in office
9 June 1878 to 18 March 1905	Joseph Georg von Ehrler	Priest of Würzburg; confirmed 9 June 1878; ordained 15 July 1878; died in office
21 March 1905 to 9 September 1910	Konrad von Busch	Priest of Speyer; confirmed 30 May 1905; ordained 16 July 1905; died in office
4 November 1910 to 26 May 1917	Michael von Faulhaber	Priest of Speyer; confirmed 7 January 1911; ordained 19 February 1911; appointed Archbishop of Munich and Freising
28 May 1917 to 20 May 1943	Ludwig Sebastian	Priest of Bamberg; confirmed 31 July 1917; ordained 23 September 1917; died in office
20 May 1943 to 9 August 1952	Joseph Wendel	Coadjutor Bishop of Speyer; installed 4 June 1943; Appointed Archbishop of Munich and Freising
22 December 1952 to 10 February 1968	Isidor Markus Emanuel	Priest of Speyer; ordained 1 February 1953; resigned
28 May 1968 to 28 October 1982	Friedrich Wetter	Priest of Speyer; ordained 29 June 1968; Appointed Archbishop of Munich and Freising; created a Cardinal in 1985 by Pope John Paul II
25 August 1983 to 10 February 2007	Anton Schlembach	Priest of Würzburg; ordained 16 October 1983
19 December 2007 to 19 August 2026	Karl-Heinz Wiesemann	Auxiliary bishop of Paderborn; installed 2 March 2008

== Auxiliary bishops ==
- Pierre Spitznagel, O. Carm. (1444–1465)
- Johann Isenberg, O.F.M. (1466–1484)
- Stephan Karrer, O.P. (1484–1486)
- Heinrich Schertlin (1486–1511)
- Lukas Schleppel (1512–1520)
- Anton Engelbrecht (1520–1525)
- Nikolaus Schigmers, O.S.A. (1529–1541)
- Georg Schweicker (1544–1563)
- Matthais Ob (1566–1572)
- Heinrich Fabricius (1575–1595)
- Dionys Burckard (1596–1605)
- Theobald Manshalter (1606–1610)
- Johannes Streck (1611–)
- Wolfgang Ralinger (1623–1663)
- Johann Brassert (1673–1684)
- Johann Philipp Burkhard (1685–1698)
- Peter Cornelius Beyweg (1701–1744)
- Johann Adam Buckel (1745–1771)
- Johann Andreas Seelmann (1772–1789)
- Valentin Philipp Anton Schmidt (1790–1805)
- Ernst Gutting (1971–1994)
- Otto Georgens (1995–2025)

== See also ==
- Lists of office-holders
- Speyer Cathedral
