= Possum (soundtrack) =

Film score by Radiophonic Workshop
- Released: 30 November 2018
- Studio: Tempus Fugit
- Length: 1:13:57
- Label: Room 13
- Producer: James Cotton; Wayne Godfrey; James Harris; Robert Jones; Mark Lane

BBC Radiophonic Workshop chronology
Doctor Who: The Five Doctors (2018)	Possum (2018)	The Box of Delights (2018)

The film score to the 2018 psychological horror film Possum directed by Matthew Holness, featured music composed by the sound effects and experimental electronic music studio The Radiophonic Workshop. It is their first soundtrack purposely constructed for a feature film, after the studio's initial disbandment and online revival in 2012. After some of Radiophonic Workshop's music were temped into the final edit which Holness likened to it, he and the music editor Tommy Boulding approached the studio members to obtain permission for their use of music. The studio then agreed to compose the film after watching the final edit.

The soundtrack to Possum was announced during late-September 2018 and released under the Room 13 label on 30 November in digital downloads and CDs, followed by a vinyl edition which released in June 2021. The album accompanied 29 tracks of the studio's score constructed for the film, along with the original member Delia Derbyshire's unreleased materials and pre-mixes. It received positive reviews from critics, who noted the unsettling and creepy tone matched the mood of the film.

== Background and development ==
The Radiophonic Workshop was created by BBC in the late 1950s, composing many of the sound effects and music for the channel, including the iconic theme for the television series Doctor Who, before closing in 1998. Afterwards, few of the team members reunited in 2009 performing live concerts under the Radiophonic Workshop name, and the project was revived as an online venture in September 2012 by BBC and Arts Council England with new members were recruited, while Matthew Herbert served as the creative director. The studio then revived old recordings of BBC television shows and films aired during their original timeline. Possum was the studio's first soundtrack which was purposely curated for a feature film.

The film's editor Tommy Boulding used an old soundtrack from the studio as a temporary placeholder to assess the flow of the film. Holness responded positively to the soundtrack, feeling that it effectively captured the main character's mental state. He and Boulding later met with the members of the newly revived Radiophonic Workshop, in order to get permission to use the soundtrack for the film. The studio responded enthusiastically to the project after being shown the initial edit for the film, offering to compose the film's soundtrack, much to the director's surprise. Holness later offered praise to the studio's scoring of the film, "What's so brilliant about them is that it's not just music, it's sound design, it's the whole package. Now suddenly, the whole film became Phillip's."

The individual artists from the studio created the score and submitted their compositions via Mark Ayres, who directly contacted Holness. During an interaction with Holness, as a part of the promotional tour, Howell said that most of their works were collaborative with Kieron Pepper used his sound recorded to capture the sounds of twanging knives and wall thuds and Roger Limb use some of the pieces he wrote for Macbeth adaptation which he found it "terrifying". Radiophonic's score of the film also featured unreleased material by the studio's original member Delia Derbyshire.

== Release ==
=== Promotion ===
The Possum soundtrack was announced during late-September 2018 with the track list featuring the studio's original score and Delia's unreleased cues. Promotional singles for the film were released on 26 October 2018. The soundtrack was later released on CD and digital download on 30 November 2018.

=== Cover artwork ===
The soundtrack's album cover was designed by Julian House of Ghost Box Records, featuring Harris' character wandering in a barren landscape under an eerie green-tinted filter. The cover design, a recurring theme of the company's creative output, was inspired by school textbooks as well as vintage cover designs of Penguin and Pelican Publishing. The image choice and colour tone were intentionally made to instill a combined sense of cosmic horror and psychedelia.

=== Vinyl release ===
It was announced that the soundtrack would also be released on vinyl sometime in 2019, however this release never occurred. A special edition vinyl of the film soundtrack was eventually released on 12 June 2021, as a part of that year's Record Store Day.

== Track listing ==
No.	Title	Length
1.	"Verse 1 and Main Titles"	02:56
2.	"Arrival Home"	01:04
3.	"Smoke Balloons"	01:48
4.	"Buried"	01:22
5.	"Verse 2, Possum Sting and Undercurrent"	00:43
6.	"Going In?"	00:43
7.	"A Demonstration"	00:31
8.	"Legs 1 and Forest 1"	01:50
9.	"Legs 2 and Rumble"	00:53
10.	"Forest 2 and Bag Opening"	01:10
11.	"Marshland 1 / Anxiety"	01:24
12.	"Marshland 2 / Verse 3 and Nightmare 1 / Bedfellows"	03:33
13.	"The Fox Story"	02:22
14.	"The Fox Story" (alternative)	02:21
15.	"The Barracks"	05:16
16.	"Newspaper / Stairs"	02:20
17.	"Storybook"	01:01
18.	"Helpless"	00:32
19.	"The Photograph and Fox Return"	01:30
20.	"Back From The Dead / Verse 4"	00:39
21.	"Nightmare 2"	03:13
22.	"Someone At The Door"	00:52
23.	"News Report"	01:13
24.	"Searching"	01:11
25.	"Cracking Up"	01:01
26.	"Pursuit"	05:58
27.	"Verse 5 / Breakdown"	01:01
28.	"Behind The Door / Mummy and Daddy / Possum-Man"	02:30
29.	"Devastation"	02:05
30.	"Arrival Home And A Demonstration" (alternative)	01:33
31.	"The Fox Story" (alternative 2)	02:15
32.	"The Barracks" (alternative)	06:05
33.	"Storybook" (alternative)	01:07
34.	"Helpless" (alternative)	00:34
35.	"Pursuit" (alternative)	05:57
36.	"Mummy and Daddy" (alternative)	01:18
37.	"Devastation" (alternative)	00:33
38.	"Opening Titles" (early mix)	01:27
Total length:		73:57

== Reception ==
Nick Joy of Sci-Fi Bulletin rated the score 9 (out of 10) writing "A bit like the movie it's supporting, Possum's soundtrack is not an easy listen and unnerves in the most unexpected ways. It really isn't for everyone, but if you can appreciate the creeping power of dissonance and growls then it's worth a spin." A reviewer from KFJC wrote "What is represented are sounds donated from the Delia Derbyshire Archive to The Radiophonic Workshop for manipulation and inclusion on the soundtrack of this extremely strange and slightly challenging film [...] Also of note is the unnerving insert containing a nursery rhyme from the film that was, for this miserable volunteer, perhaps more disturbing than the film itself. Imaginations being what they are…"

Finlay Mulligan of Electronic Sound wrote "With 'Possum', The Radiophonic Workshop have reached new, unnerving heights. They have translated their body of 20th century soundtrack work, and fine-tuned it perfectly for the world of 21st century horror. 'Possum' is ominous, terrifying, weird, alien, unnerving – it will deceptively lull you into a false sense of security with a playful melody, before exposing your worst fears with a piercing, rumbling growl." Reviewing the main title theme, Carlos Hawthorn of Resident Advisor wrote "The pioneering sound effects studio delivers the eerie theme music for Matthew Holness's directorial debut, which follows a disgraced children's puppeteer as he confronts his past."

Dennis Harvey of Variety wrote "The unsettled, unsettling score is by the Radiophonic Workshop, an ensemble of British experimental electronic musicians whose work for the BBC and elsewhere stretches back over half a century." Neil Young of The Hollywood Reporter called it a "creepy score". Kim Newman of Empire noted that Radiophonic's music "augment[ed] the mood, embedding Possum in the earthy, sinister British film/TV folk horror tradition." Carmen Paddock of The Skinny called it a "hypnotic score". Pat Brown of Slant Magazine wrote "the cacophonous score by the Radiophonic Workshop crescendos, becomes the central mystery of the film."

== Chart performance ==
Chart (2021)	Peak position
UK Soundtrack Albums (OCC)	13
UK Independent Album Breakers (OCC)	16
