= Messe in A (Tambling) =

2010 mass by Christopher Tambling

- Mass by Christopher Tambling
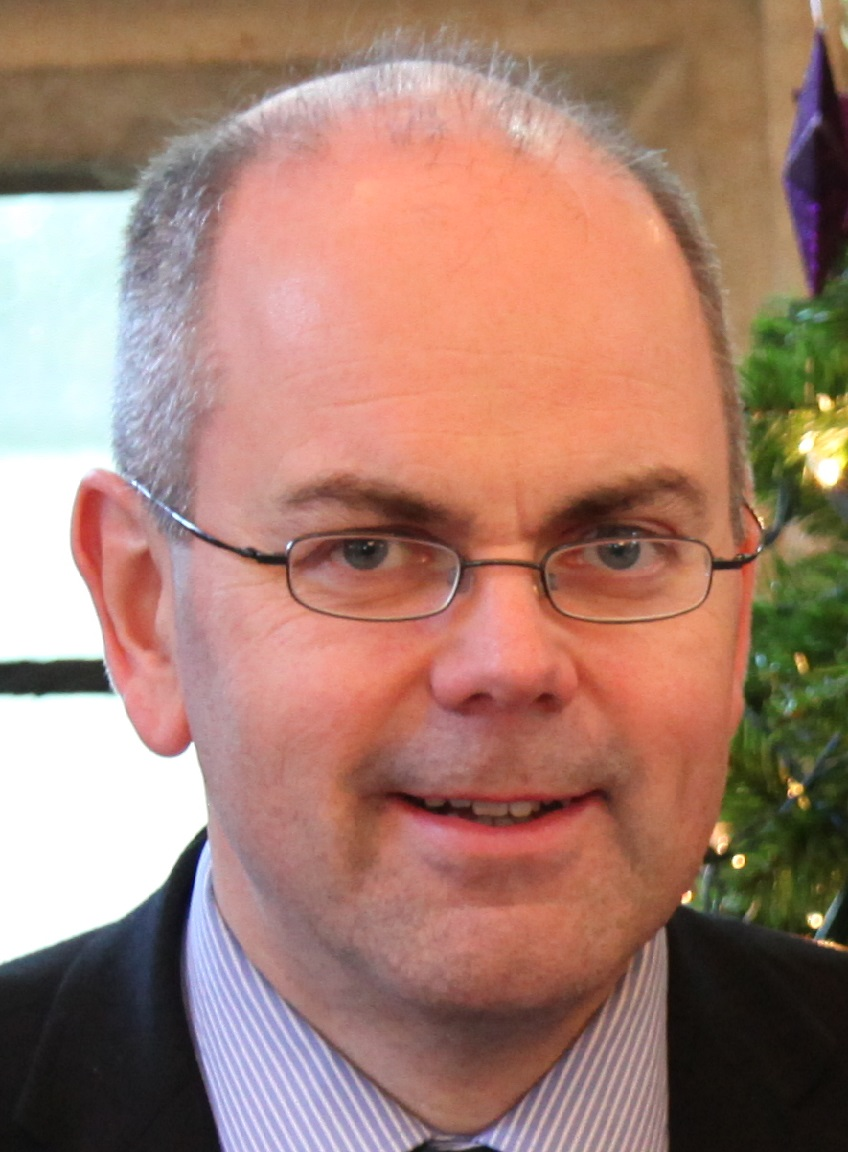
- The composer in 2011
- Key: A major
- Text: Mass ordinary
- Language: Latin
- Published: 2010 (2016)
- Movements: 4
- Vocal: soprano(s) (four-part choir)
- Instrumental: organ with optional strings

Messe in A is a mass in A major by the English composer Christopher Tambling. The first version was published in 2010, scored for two high voices, the second of them optional, accompanied by organ with optional strings. It was written with boys' choirs in mind, but is also suitable for girls' choirs and women's choirs. A version for four-part choir, organ and optional orchestra was published in 2016.

== History ==
Tambling, a church musician and music pedagogue, was described as "a great believer in making church music accessible". His sacred music became especially popular in Germany. He was music director of the Downside School near Bath and organist and leader of the Schola Cantorum of Downside Abbey, a choir of about 100 of boys and girls from the school. Tambling was commissioned to write a mass setting for the Pueri Cantores boys' choirs of the Diocese of Würzburg, requesting a melodic work, easy to perform and of a joyful disposition ("freudige Grundhaltung"). In the Messe in A he set the Latin text of the mass ordinary, without the Credo, which makes it a formally a short mass or missa brevis. The mass was first published in 2010 by Dr. J. Butz with a dedication to the Pueri Cantores in the Würzburg diocese.

The mass was so well received, that the composer was requested to also compose a version for four-part choir SATB, organ and optional strings. He composed that version, which was published by Butz in 2016, after his death.

The mass is frequently performed, also by Protestant church choirs. The mass has been chosen for services for Easter and anniversaries, among others. The early version is in the repertoire of youth choirs such as the Domsingschule of the Frankfurt Cathedral, Lutherana in Karlsruhe, the Mädchenkantorei of the Paderborn Cathedral and the Mädchenchor of the Speyer Cathedral. It was recommended by the association for church music in South Tyrol as a good entry in mass literature.

== Music ==
The mass is structured in four movements, omitting a Credo, and combining Sanctus and Benedictus:

1. Kyrie (Andante con moto)
2. Gloria (Alla marcia)
3. Sanctus und Benedictus (Giocoso)
4. Agnus Dei (Andante espressivo)

In the early version, the vocal parts are one or two high voices, soprano and optional soprano II, while in the later version they are four voices SATB. In both versions, the voices are accompanied by organ, with strings ad libitum.

The composer is credited with knowing exactly what young singers are capable to sing and like to sing: "beautiful melodic lines, and both rousing and soulful passages" ("wunderschöne melodische Linien oder mal mitreißende, mal gefühlvolle Passagen"). Based on the tradition of English choral music, Tambling wrote expressive music characterised by "sophisticated harmonies and refined rhythms" ("ausgefeilte Harmonik und raffinierte Rhythmik").
