= Messe in G (Tambling) =

2014 mass in G major by Christopher Tambling

- Missa brevis by Christopher Tambling
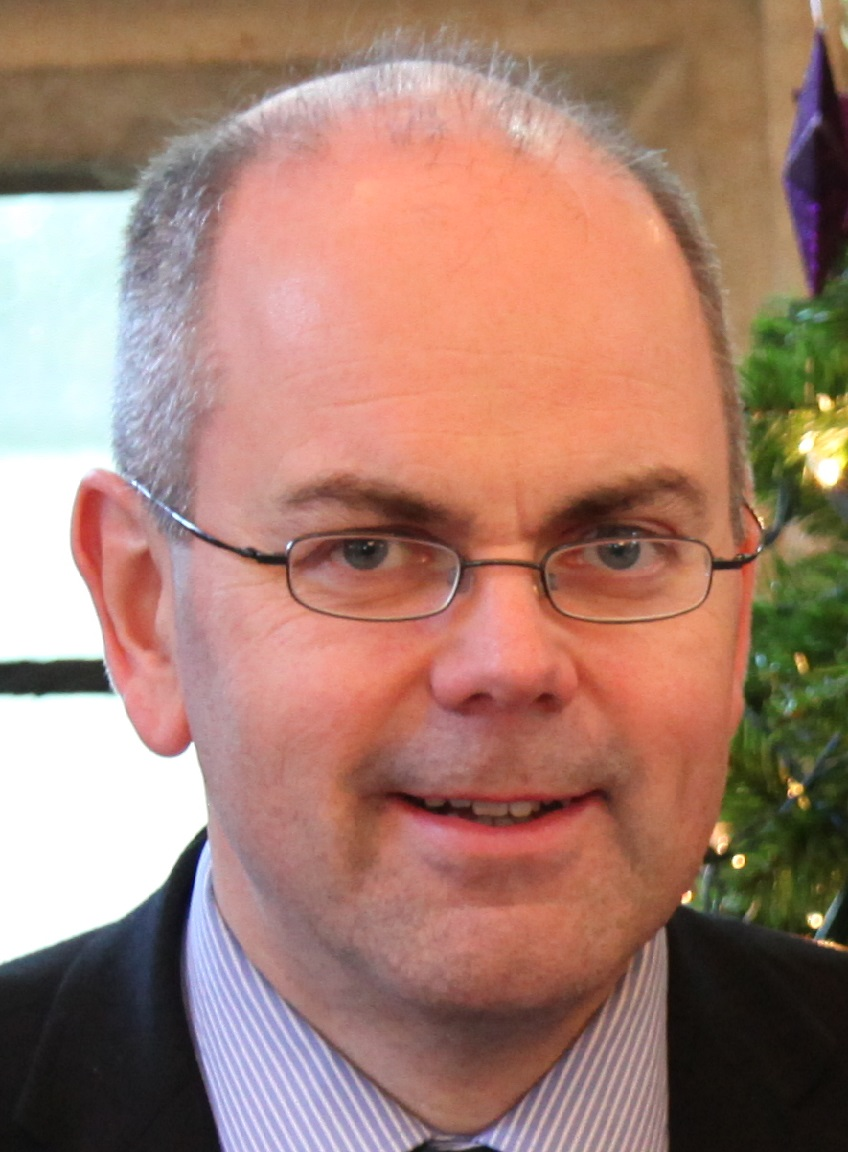
- The composer in 2011
- Key: G major
- Form: Missa brevis
- Text: Mass ordinary
- Language: Latin
- Composed: 2013
- Dedication: St. Cyriakus
- Published: 2014
- Movements: five
- Vocal: SATB choir
- Instrumental: orchestra and organ

Messe in G is a mass in G major by the English composer Christopher Tambling. He composed it in 2013, scored for mixed choir and organ, optionally also with orchestra. The congregation is meant to participate, singing the theme of the Gloria as a refrain, and the theme of the Sanctus. The mass was first published in 2014.

== History ==
Tambling, a church musician and music pedagogue, was described as "a great believer in making church music accessible". In Messe in G, he set the Latin text of the mass ordinary, without the Credo, which makes it a formally a short mass or missa brevis. The congregation can optionally participate in the Gloria and the Sanctus. Tambling dedicated it to the church St. Cyriakus in Schwäbisch Gmünd-Bettringen. The mass was first published in 2014 by Dr. J. Butz. The mass, like Tambling's other sacred music, is popular in Germany.

== Structure and scoring ==
The mass is structured in five movements, omitting a Credo:

1. Kyrie (Moderato molto)
2. Gloria (Alla marcia)
3. Sanctus (Maestoso)
4. Benedictus (Moderato)
5. Agnus Dei (Andantino)

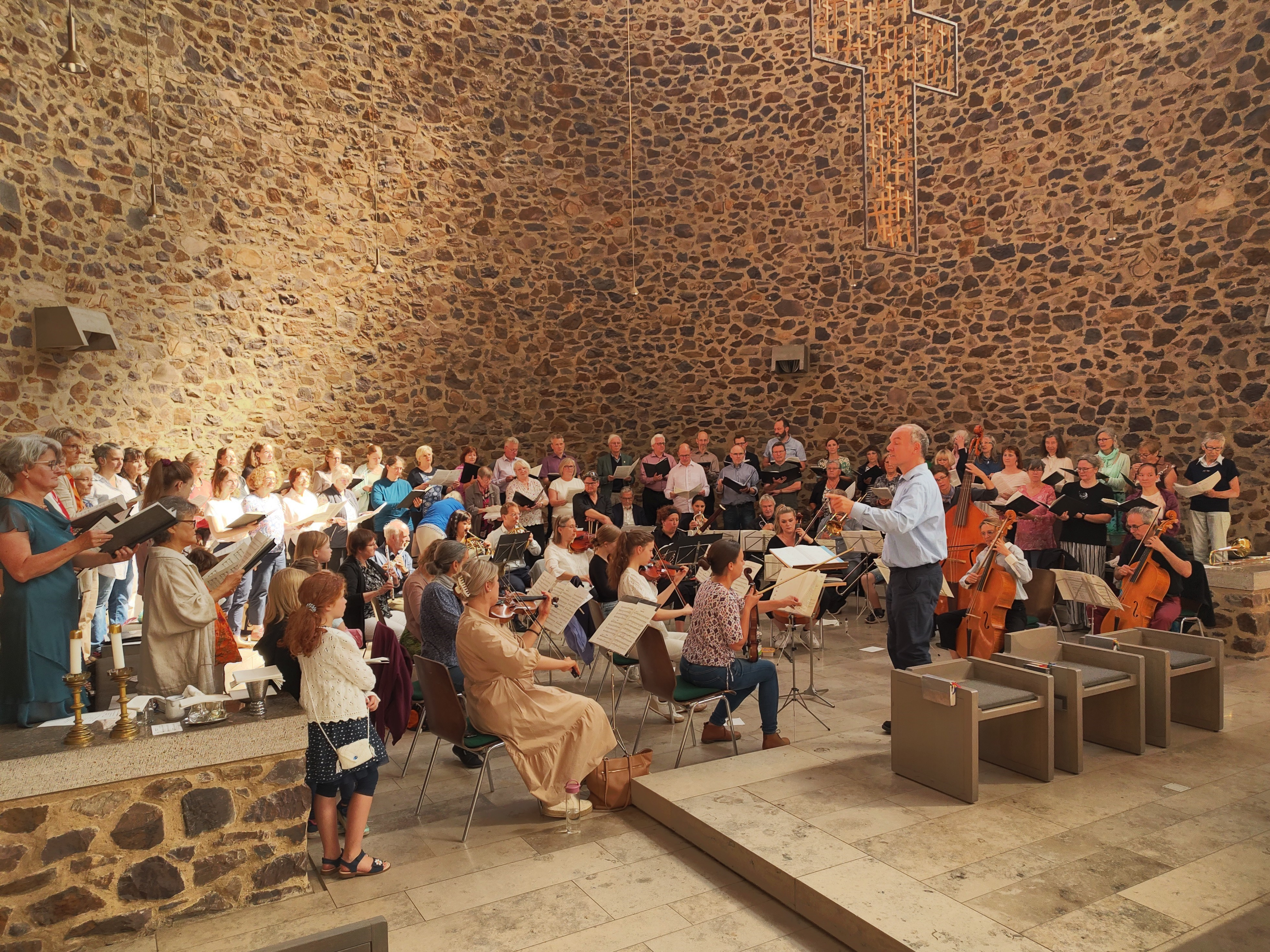
Performance by choirs ad orchestra of St. Martin, Idstein, 2018

It is scored for mixed choir and organ, but there are optional parts for a flexible orchestra. The congregation can optionally sing the theme of the Gloria which is repeated throughout the movement, framing passages that express the different aspects of the text in contrasting character. The theme is unison, and also several other phrases, such as men only for "Domine Deus" (Lord God), women only for "Domine Fili" (Lord Son). The congregation participates also in the Sanctus. For most of the mass, the tenor part is the same as the bass, and marked as optional.

The duration is given as 11 minutes.
