= Pierre Spitznagel =

Roman Catholic archbishop

Most Reverend Pierre Spitznagel
- Auxiliary Bishop of Speyer; Titular Bishop of Myra
- Church: Catholic Church
- Diocese: Diocese of Speyer
- In office: 1444–1465

Personal details
- Born: 1411 Frankfurt, Germany
- Died: 1465 (age 54) Speyer, Germany

Pierre Spitznagel, O. Carm. (1411–1465) was a Roman Catholic prelate who served as Auxiliary Bishop of Speyer (1444–1465).

== Biography ==
Pierre Spitznagel was born in Frankfurt, Germany in 1411 and ordained a priest in the Order of the Brothers of the Blessed Virgin Mary of Mount Carmel. In 1444, he was appointed during the papacy of Pope Eugene IV as Auxiliary Bishop of Speyer and Titular Bishop of Myra. He served as Auxiliary Bishop of Speyer until his death in 1465. While bishop, he was the principal co-consecrator of Siegfried von Venningen, Bishop of Speyer (1456).
