= Praroman (company) =

15th-century trading company

Praroman Company
- Native name: Compagnie Praroman
- Formerly: Praroman-Bonvisin Company
- Company type: Trading company
- Industry: Trade
- Fate: Dissolved
- Headquarters: Fribourg, Switzerland
- Key people: Henri Wertzo, Guillaume de Praroman, Jaquet Bonvisin
- Products: Wool, hides, hardware, glass

Praroman, also known as the Praroman-Bonvisin Company, was the principal trading company of the city of Fribourg in the 15th century. Founded in the early 1380s, the company traded in wool, hides, hardware, and glass, and maintained connections to Avignon. Several of its members were accused of being Waldensians during heresy trials in Fribourg in 1399 and 1430.

== History ==
The company was founded in the early 1380s by Henri Wertzo (a member of the Praroman family), Guillaume de Praroman, and Jaquet Bonvisin. The company was subsequently directed by Guillaume's cousin Jaquillin de Praroman (mentioned from 1394 to 1414), Jaquet's son Heinzli Bonvisin, Jaquillin's son Jaques II de Praroman, and Guillaume's son Petermann de Praroman. Several of these directors simultaneously served as treasurers of the city of Fribourg.

From 1397 to 1404, the company formed a partnership with the brothers Jean and Hanso Studer in Avignon. The day-to-day management of business affairs was handled by secretaries and factors including Petermann Möiry (from 1406), Simon von Kanel from the Diocese of Speyer (from 1427), Cono von Lanthen (from 1430), and Hensli Thüremberg (from 1438).

== Waldensian accusations ==
Many members of the company, as well as the Studer brothers, were accused of being Waldensians during trials that took place in Fribourg in 1399 and 1430. The company is last mentioned in the early 1460s.

== Bibliography ==
K. Utz Tremp, Waldenser, Wiedergänger, Hexen und Rebellen, 1999, pp. 371–381
