= St. Maria (Landau) =

Catholic church in Palatinate, Germany

- Katholische Pfarrkirche Mariä Himmelfahrt
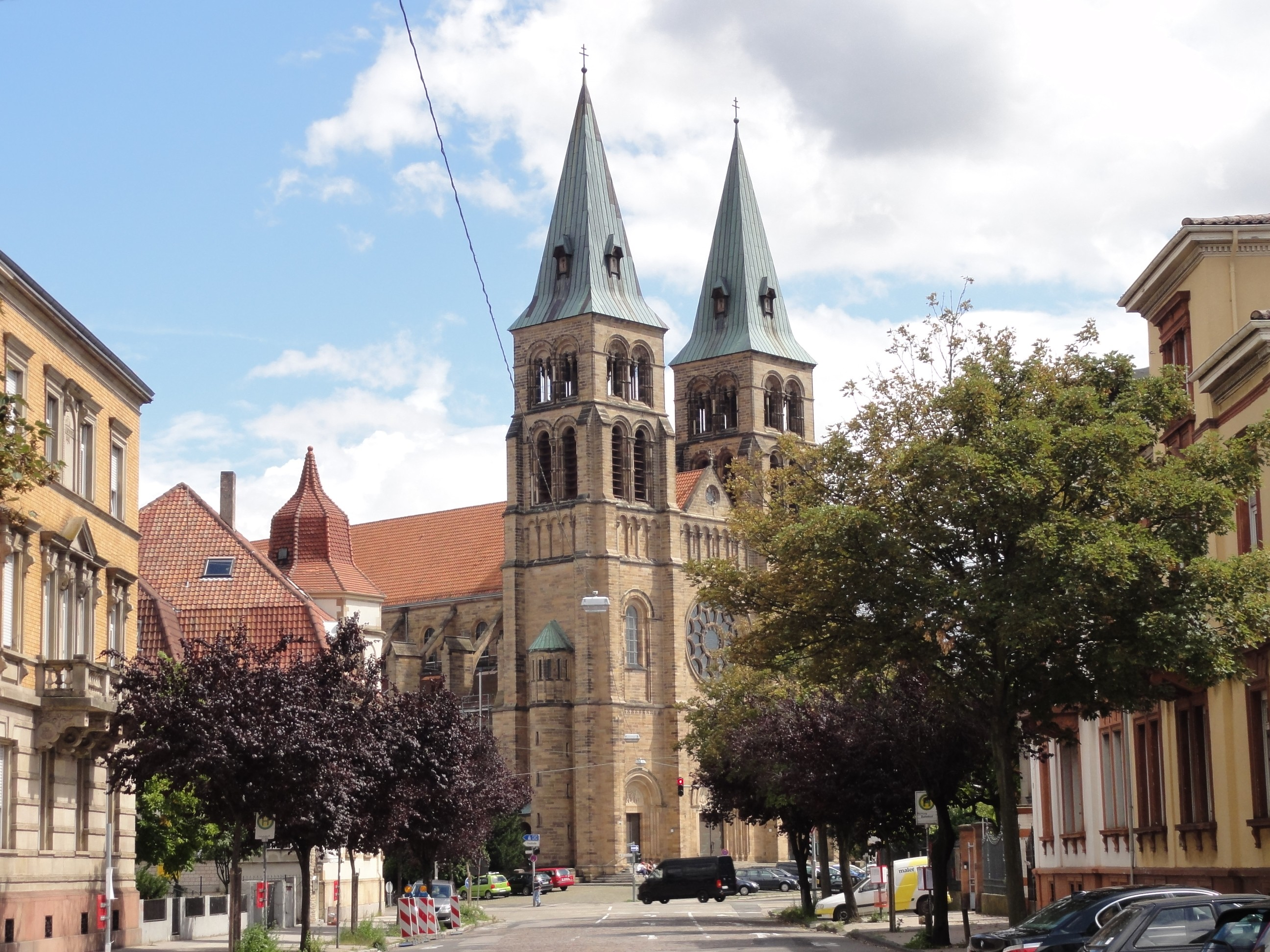
- St. Maria
- 49°11′35″N 8°06′55″E
- Location: Landau
- Denomination: Catholic
- Website: start.kirchelandau.de

History
- Dedication: Assumption of Mary
- Consecrated: 1911

Architecture
- Architect: Joseph Cades

Administration
- Diocese: Diocese of Speyer

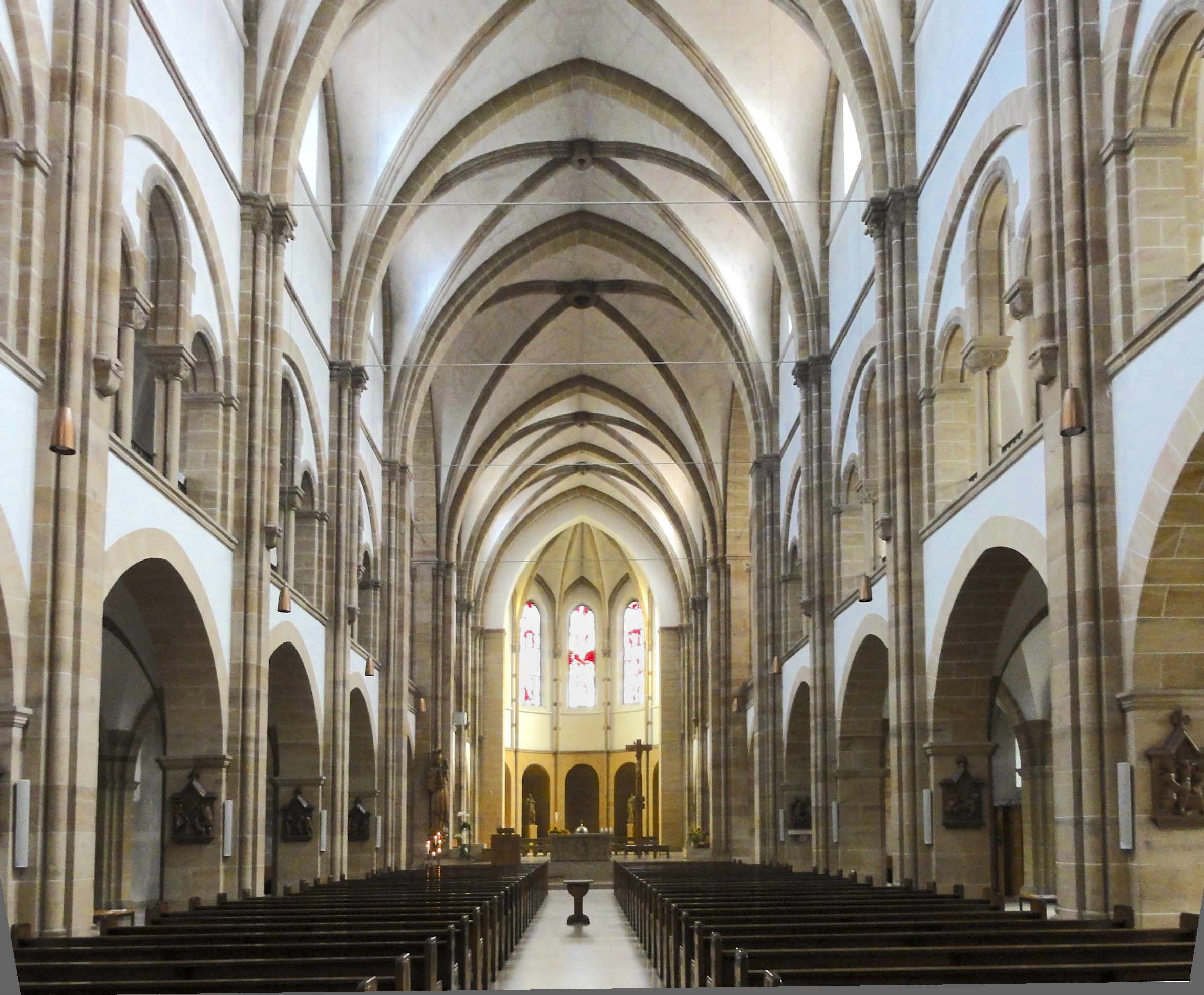
Interior

St. Maria is the common name of the Catholic parish church of Landau, Palatinate, Germany. The official name is Stadtpfarrkirche St. Mariä Himmelfahrt (English: Parish Church of St. Mary of the Assumption). It is dedicated to the Assumption of Mary. Built in Romanesque Revival style, it is also called Marienkirche, and Dom zu Landau, for its dominant size reminiscent of a cathedral. It is a listed building of Landau.

== History ==
In Landau, Catholic and Protestant Christians shared a Medieval Gothic church building, the Stiftskirche. In 1893, the Catholics received the Augustinerkirche and a property at the Südring, to build a new church. The Augustinerkirche soon became too small for a growing parish. In 1904, Joseph Cades from Stuttgart, and master builder of the Diocese of Rottenburg, was commissioned to design a new church. His proposal in Romanesque Revival style with elements of early Gothic style used elements of cathedrals. Allegedly, Cades had planned the model for the cathedral of Rottenburg.

In 1907, the Catholic church council of Landau decided to build this new church in the then new Landau-Süd. The cornerstone was laid in 1908. It was completed, with the exception of the two high towers, in 1910, and was blessed on 8 December that year by a dean from the cathedral, making it ready for Christmas services that year. When building had been completed, it was consecrated on 12 June 1911 by Bishop Michael von Faulhaber, naming it in Latin ""St. Maria in coelum assumpta". It is a listed building of Landau. The church became the largest church building of southern Palatinate.

In World War II, the sacristy of the church was damaged in bombing. It was rebuilt in new design, completed in 1955. The altar area was redesigned in 1974, following the reforms of the Second Vatican Council. The vaults were restored in 1985. In 2011, Cardinal Friedrich Wetter celebrated the service for the centenary.

=== Organ ===
The organ was built by Steinmeyer from Oettingen in Bayern. It was completed in 1924, with 4,500 pipes in 70 stops on three manuals and pedal. In the 1950s, the instrument was adjust to the sound wanted at the time, for Baroque music. At the same time, the casing was removed.

In 2010 to 2012, the organ was restored to its original late-Romantic sound by Romanus Seifert & Sohn from Kevelaer. Of the original pipes, c. 3,500 were retained, and also a large proportion of the technical installation. The historic casing was restored.
