= Anton Schlembach =

German bishop (1932–2020)

His Excellency Anton Schlembach
- 95th Bishop of Speyer
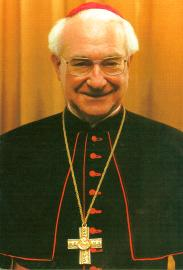
- Bishop Anton Schlembach
- Archdiocese: Bamberg
- Province: Bamberg
- Diocese: Speyer
- See: Speyer
- Predecessor: Friedrich Wetter
- Successor: Karl-Heinz Wiesemann

Personal details
- Born: 7 February 1932 Großwenkheim, Bavaria, Germany
- Died: 15 June 2020 (aged 88) Speyer, Rhineland-Palatinate, Germany
- Denomination: Catholic
- Education: University of Würzburg
- Coat of arms

Anton Schlembach (7 February 1932 – 15 June 2020) was a German Roman Catholic clergyman who served as the 95th Bishop of Speyer.

== Childhood and education ==
Anton Schlembach was born in Großwenkheim near Münnerstadt, Unterfranken in the archdiocese of Würzburg, the oldest of four children in a farmer's family. After graduating in 1950, from the Humanist Gymnasium in Miltenberg, he studied Catholic theology at the University of Würzburg and at the Papal University in Rome. He was ordained as a priest of Würzburg on 10 October 1956 with Cardinal Franz König. In 1959 he was awarded doctorate of theology. In 1981 he became vicar general in Würzburg.

== As Bishop of Speyer ==
On 25 August 1983 Pope John Paul II named him the successor to bishop Friedrich Wetter. He ascended to the office on 16 October 1983 in the Speyer cathedral, consecrated by his predecessor Friedrich Wetter, Archbishop of Munich.

Pope Benedict XVI agreed to his retirement, effective 10 February 2007.

Schlembach died 15 June 2020, aged 88.

== Writings ==
- Anton Schlembach, Waltraud Herbstrith: Erinnere dich – vergiss es nicht: Edith Stein – christlich-jüdische Perspektiven; Plöger Medien, 1986; ISBN 3-89857-050-9
- Anton Schlembach, Karlheinz Debus: Robert Schuman. Lothringer – Europäer – Christ; Speyer: Pilger-Verlag, ISBN 3-87637-054-X.
- Anton Schlembach, Dienst unter sechs Päpsten; in: Bernhard Oswald (Hrsg.): Lebenswege. Miltenberger Abiturienten 1950; Miltenberg 2007; ISBN 978-3-00-020445-6
- Anton Schlembach: Zeugen des Glaubens. Predigten und Beiträge aus 24 Bischofsjahren. Festgabe zum 75. Geburtstag von Bischof Dr. Anton Schlembach; Speyer: Pilger-Verlag, 2007; ISBN 3-87637-082-5

Catholic Church titles
Preceded by Friedrich Wetter	Bishop of Speyer; 1983–2007	Succeeded by Karl-Heinz Wiesemann
