= Christopher Tambling =

British composer and choirmaster (1964–2015)

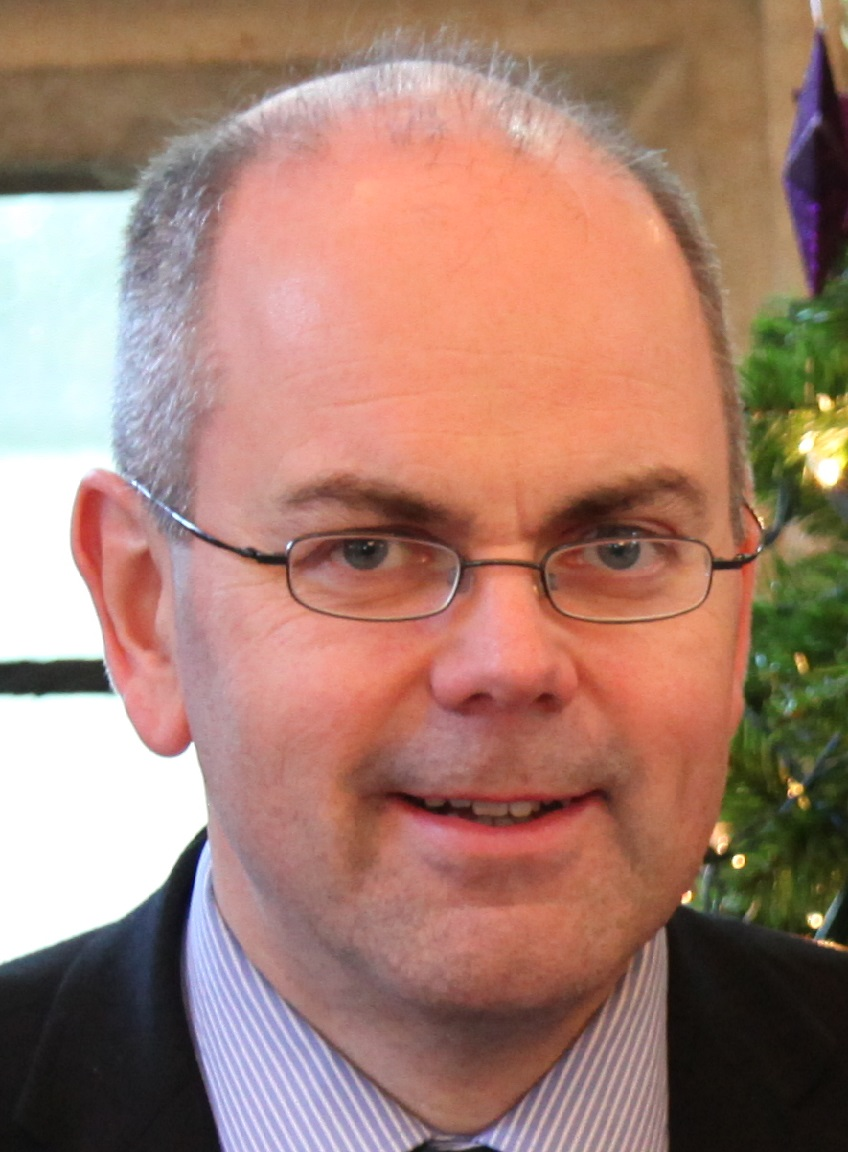
- Born: 13 May 1964; Clevedon, Somerset, England
- Died: 3 October 2015 (aged 51); Somerset, England
- Education: Christ's Hospital; St Peter's College, Oxford
- Occupations: Composer; choral conductor; teacher
- Children: 2

Christopher Tambling (13 May 1964 – 3 October 2015) was a British composer, organist and choirmaster. From 1997 to 2015 he was Director of Music at Downside School and organist and Choirmaster of the Schola Cantorum at Downside Abbey, leading the choir to international success.

== Life ==
He received his musical education from Malcolm McKelvey at Christ's Hospital in Horsham, Sussex and at St Peter's College, Oxford. He later became the city organist and conductor of the Symphony Orchestra and Music Director of Glenalmond College in Perth, Scotland. His organ pupils have gone on to continuing success, including scholarships to Oxford and Cambridge.

Tambling died in Somerset in 2015 and was survived by his wife and two sons, both of whom are professional musicians.

== Works ==
Tambling established himself as a composer and arranger of choral and organ works especially, well beyond the borders of his country. His compositions are often characterized by a romantic, expressive and an easy to get style. His main publisher in the UK was Kevin Mayhew and in German-speaking countries Dr. J. Butz. Tambling published books for students of various instruments, including a hugely successful 4 four-volume series, The Church Organist: A New Method, which, combining technical studies, improvisation, hymn-playing and a broad purview of repertoire, offers an approachable method to mastering the organ and has been lauded as a must-have for any aspiring organist. Tambling also wrote a number of pieces for children, including two children’s musicals with Michael Forster, which have been performed all over the world.

His works include, with the years indicating publication:

- Missa brevis in E flat for choir and organ (wind instruments ad lib.)(2017)
- Mass in A for choir and organ (strings ad lib.) (2015)
- Pastoralmesse for choir, orchestra and organ (2014)
- Missa brevis in B-flat for choir and organ, with optional brass and tubular bells (2013)
- Messe in G for choir, orchestra and organ (2013)
- Missa Festiva for choir and organ (2013)
- Messe in A for one or two soprano choral voices, with organ and optional strings (2010)
- Festmesse in F for choir and organ (wind instruments ad lib.)
- Arrangement of Mass in B flat for choir and organ by Charles Villiers Stanford
- Arrangement of Missa brevis. Mass of St Gregory for SATB, organ and winds ad. lib. by Richard Runciman Terry
- British Album, ten pieces for organ (2009)
- Very British, eight pieces for organ (2013)
- Best of British, ten pieces for organ (2016)
- Great British, thirteen pieces for organ (2022)
- Six Pieces for flute (or oboe) and organ (2012)
- Ein Haus voll Glorie schauet, for choir, orchestra and organ, on the hymn "Ein Haus voll Glorie schauet", 2012 for the millennium of Bamberg Cathedral
