= Matthäus Georg von Chandelle =

German priest

Coat of arms of Matthäus Georg von Chandelle

Matthäus Georg von Chandelle (born 1745 in Frankfurt) was a German clergyman and bishop for the Roman Catholic Diocese of Speyer. He was ordained in 1769. He was appointed bishop in 1818. He died in 1826.
