= Heinrich Hartard of Rollingen =

German clergyman and bishop

Heinrich Hartard of Rolligen (December 13, 1633 in Ansembourg – November 30, 1719) was a German clergyman and Bishop of Speyer. He was ordained in 1658. He was appointed bishop of the diocese in 1711. He died in 1719.
