= Karl-Heinz Wiesemann =

German bishop

His Excellency The Most Reverend Karl-Heinz Wiesemann
- Bishop Emeritus of Speyer
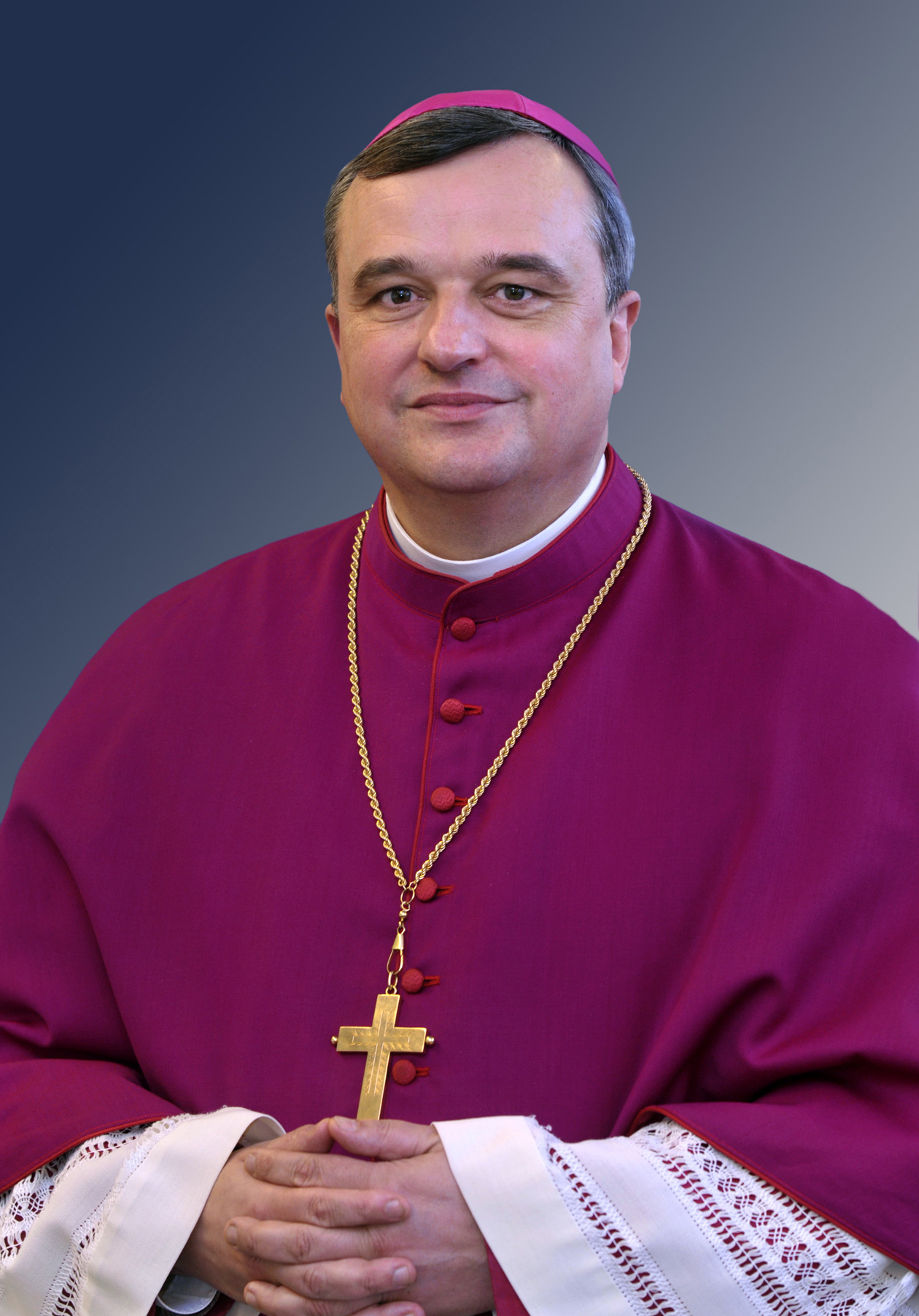
- Bishop Karl-Heinz Wiesemann
- Diocese: Diocese of Speyer
- Appointed: 19 December 2007
- Installed: 2 March 2008
- Term ended: 19 August 2026
- Predecessor: Anton Schlembach

Orders
- Ordination: 10 October 1985 by Cardinal Franz König
- Consecration: 8 September 2002 by Joachim Wanke

Personal details
- Born: 1 August 1960 (age 66) Herford, West Germany
- Motto: Major Omni Laude
- Coat of arms

Karl-Heinz Wiesemann (born 1 August 1960) is a German Roman Catholic prelate, who served as the 96th Bishop of Speyer from 2007 until his resignation in 2026. Previously he served as an auxiliary bishop of the Archdiocese of Paderborn from 2002 until 2007.

== Life ==
Wiesemann was born in Herford, North Rhine-Westphalia in the archdiocese of Paderborn. He became a chaplain on 10 October 1985 in Rome. He later served as a priest in Bösperde, a suburb of Menden and provost of St. Petrus and Andreas in Brilon.

In 2002 Pope John Paul II named him Auxiliary bishop, to which he was ordained on 8 September 2002 in Paderborn Cathedral.

On 19 December 2007 Pope Benedict XVI named him the successor to bishop Anton Schlembach. He was installed to the office on 2 March 2008 in Speyer Cathedral.

== Positions ==
In January 2014, Wiesemann supported married priests in Roman-Catholic Church. In February 2022, Wiesemann supported blessings of same-sex unions. He promised to respect the consciences of priests who refuse to bless the unions, while asking them to refer the couples to the diocesan office. This office would then contact another priest willing to bless the union. Remarried couples are to be treated the same way.

Catholic Church titles
Preceded by Anton Schlembach	Bishop of Speyer; 2007–2026	Succeeded by Vacant
