= Johann I of Kraichgau =

The text of this article is based on a translation of the German language article, Johannes I

Johann I, Count of Kraichgau (born 1063/1064, died October 26, 1104) was Bishop of Speyer from 1090 to 1104.

Johann I came from the family of the Counts of Zeisolf-Wolfram. His parents were Wolfram and Atzela, and his uncle was Hermann III von Hochstaden, the Archbishop of Cologne.

Johann served prior to his episcopacy as an archdeacon at the collegiate church of Sinsheim. On March 7, 1090 he became Bishop of Speyer.

The family was closely connected with the Salians. Johann I was a faithful follower of Emperor Henry IV and remained in the investiture dispute at his side. In expiation of a consequent ban from the Pope, he founded Blaubeuren Abbey with his niece Adelaide. He also converted the collegiate church of Sinsheim to a monastery, for which he made rich endowments from his private possession.

During the 1096 Massacre of Jews in Speyer connected to the First Crusade, he took the town's Jews into his personal protection.

Bishop Johann died on October 26, 1104, at the age of 41 and is registered on the day of his death with an annual memorial mass in the newer Seelbuch of Speyer Cathedral. He was buried in the collegiate church of Sinsheim, in a tomb in front of the high altar, where his mother was laid to rest. Johann's father and brother Wolfram were buried there in front of the altar of the apostle.

According to the chroniclers Philipp Simonis (1532-1587) and Wilhelm Eysengrein, he bequeathed his family's possession, the Castle of Spangenberg to the diocese of Speyer.

The writer Wilhelm Hünermann used Bishop John vom Kraichgau as a literary figure in his 1941 novel The Living Light (Verlag der Buchgemeinde Bonn), about the life of St. Hildegard of Bingen.

== See also ==
- History of the Jews in Speyer

== Additional sources ==
- Johannes Emil Gugumus: Johannes I., Graf im Kraichgau. In: Neue Deutsche Biographie (NDB). Band 10, Duncker & Humblot, Berlin 1974, ISBN 3-428-00191-5, S. 536 f. (Digitalisat).
- Konrad von Busch und Franz Xaver Glasschröder: Chorregel und jüngeres Seelbuch des alten Speyerer Domkapitels, Speyer, Historischer Verein der Pfalz, 1923, Seiten 454 und 455 (mit biografischen Angaben zur Person).
