= Friedrich Wetter =

German cardinal of the Catholic Church

His Eminence Friedrich Wetter
- Cardinal, Archbishop Emeritus of Munich and Freising
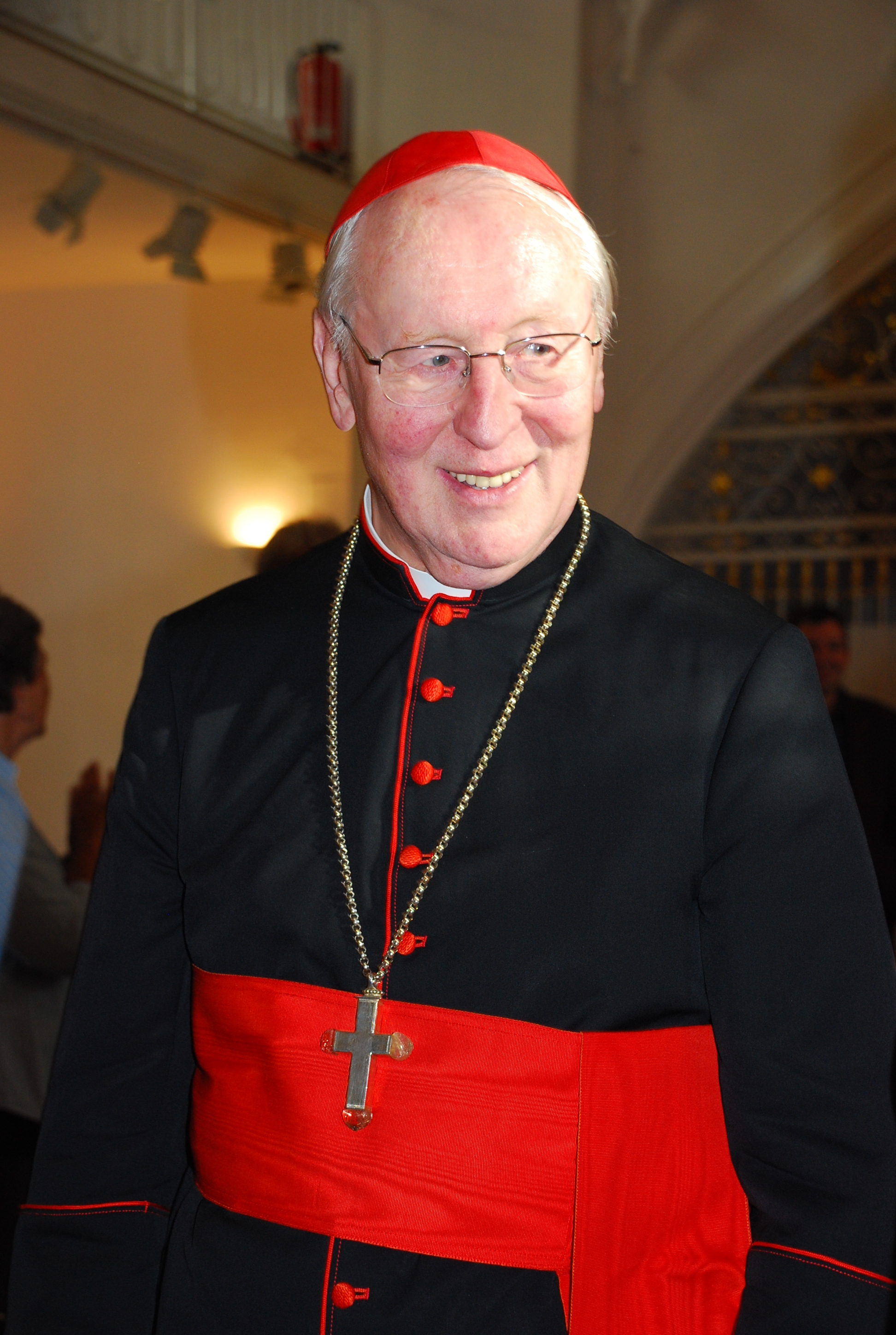
- Church: Catholic Church
- Archdiocese: Munich and Freising
- See: Munich and Freising
- Appointed: 28 October 1982
- Installed: 12 December 1982
- Term ended: 2 February 2007
- Predecessor: Joseph Ratzinger
- Successor: Reinhard Marx
- Other post: Cardinal Priest of Santo Stephano in Coelio Monte (1985–)
- Previous posts: Bishop of Speyer (1968–82); Apostolic Administrator of Munich and Freising (2007–2008)

Orders
- Ordination: 10 October 1953 by Clemente Micara
- Consecration: 29 June 1968 by Isidor Markus Emanuel
- Created cardinal: 25 May 1985 by Pope John Paul II
- Rank: Cardinal-Priest

Personal details
- Born: 20 February 1928 (age 98) Landau, Germany
- Denomination: Catholic
- Education: Sankt Georgen Graduate School of Philosophy and Theology; Pontifical Gregorian University
- Motto: Pax Vobis ("Peace to you")
- Coat of arms

Styles of Friedrich Wetter
- Reference style: His Eminence
- Spoken style: Your Eminence
- Religious style: Cardinal
- Informal style: Cardinal
- See: Munich and Freising (emeritus)

Friedrich Wetter (born 20 February 1928) is a German cardinal of the Catholic Church. He was Archbishop of Munich and Freising, Germany, from 1982 to 2007. He was Bishop of Speyer from 1968 to 1982. He has been a cardinal since 1985.

== Early life ==
Wetter was born on 20 February 1928. He studied first in Landau and then from 1948 to 1956 at the Sankt Georgen Graduate School of Philosophy and Theology and at the Gregorian University in Rome, where he obtained a doctorate in theology. In 1953, he was ordained a priest in Rome by Cardinal Clemente Micara.

He was a chaplain in Speyer from 1956 to 1958 and taught at the seminary there from 1958 to 1960. He was assistant parish priest for a year in Glanmünchweiler, and then taught as Professor of Fundamental Theology in Eichstätt from 1962 to 1967 and as Professor of Dogmatic Theology at the Johannes Gutenberg University of Mainz in 1967 for a year.

== Bishop and cardinal ==
On 28 May 1968, Pope Paul VI appointed him bishop of Speyer. He received his episcopal consecration on 29 June from Bishop Isidor Markus Emanuel, his predecessor in Speyer.

Pope John Paul II named him Archbishop of Munich and Freising on 28 October 1982 and he was installed there on 12 December.

While Archbishop of Munich and Freising, he chaired the Freising Bishops Conference and from 1981 to 2008 he chaired the faith commission of the German Bishops' Conference.

He was made a cardinal by Pope John Paul on 25 May 1985, with the title of Cardinal-Priest of Santo Stefano Rotondo.

In October 2004 he protested that objections to the appointment of Rocco Buttiglione to the European Commission represented anti-Catholic bias, saying that Catholics like Konrad Adenauer, Robert Schuman, and Alcide de Gasperi, founders of the European Union, would now be excluded from its leadership. Buttiglione, a conservative Catholic nominated to handle issues of civil liberties and discrimination, had promised that his personal views would not interfere with his work, but members of the European parliament found his views on homosexuality and the proper role of women in society disqualifying.

He was one of the cardinal electors who participated in the 2005 papal conclave that elected Pope Benedict XVI.

Pope Benedict accepted his resignation on 2 February 2007. He continued there as apostolic administrator until the installation of Reinhard Marx as his successor on 2 February 2008.

The January 2022 report on the handling of cases of sexual abuse on the part of priests in the Munich archdiocese accused Wetter of "mishandling" 21 cases during his tenure as archbishop and administrator. Wetter defended his actions in detail and disputed much of the report; he admitted fault in one case in particular that the report addressed at great length. He apologized for failing to listen to victims of abuse and recognizing how abuse affected them and their families.

== Works (selected) ==
- Die Trinitätslehre des Johannes Duns Scotus (= Beiträge zur Geschichte der Philosophie und Theologie des Mittelalters, file 41, H. 5), Aschendorff, Münster 1967, (Thesis of Habilitation, Ludwig-Maximilians-Universität München, Munich, Theological Faculty, 28 October 1965).
- Licht der Weihnacht. Verlag Herder, Freiburg im Breisgau 1990, 2. Aufl. 1991, ISBN 3-451-22086-5 (116 S.).

== See also ==
- Cardinals created by John Paul II

Catholic Church titles
Preceded by Isidor Markus Emanuel	Bishop of Speyer; 28 May 1968 – 28 October 1982	Succeeded by Anton Schlembach
Preceded by Joseph Ratzinger	Archbishop of Munich and Freising; 28 October 1992 – 2 February 2007	Succeeded by Reinhard Marx
Preceded by József Mindszenty	Cardinal Priest of Santo Stefano al Monte Celio; 25 May 1985 – present	Incumbent
