= Robert Jones (Welsh composer) =

Welsh composer, organist and choirmaster

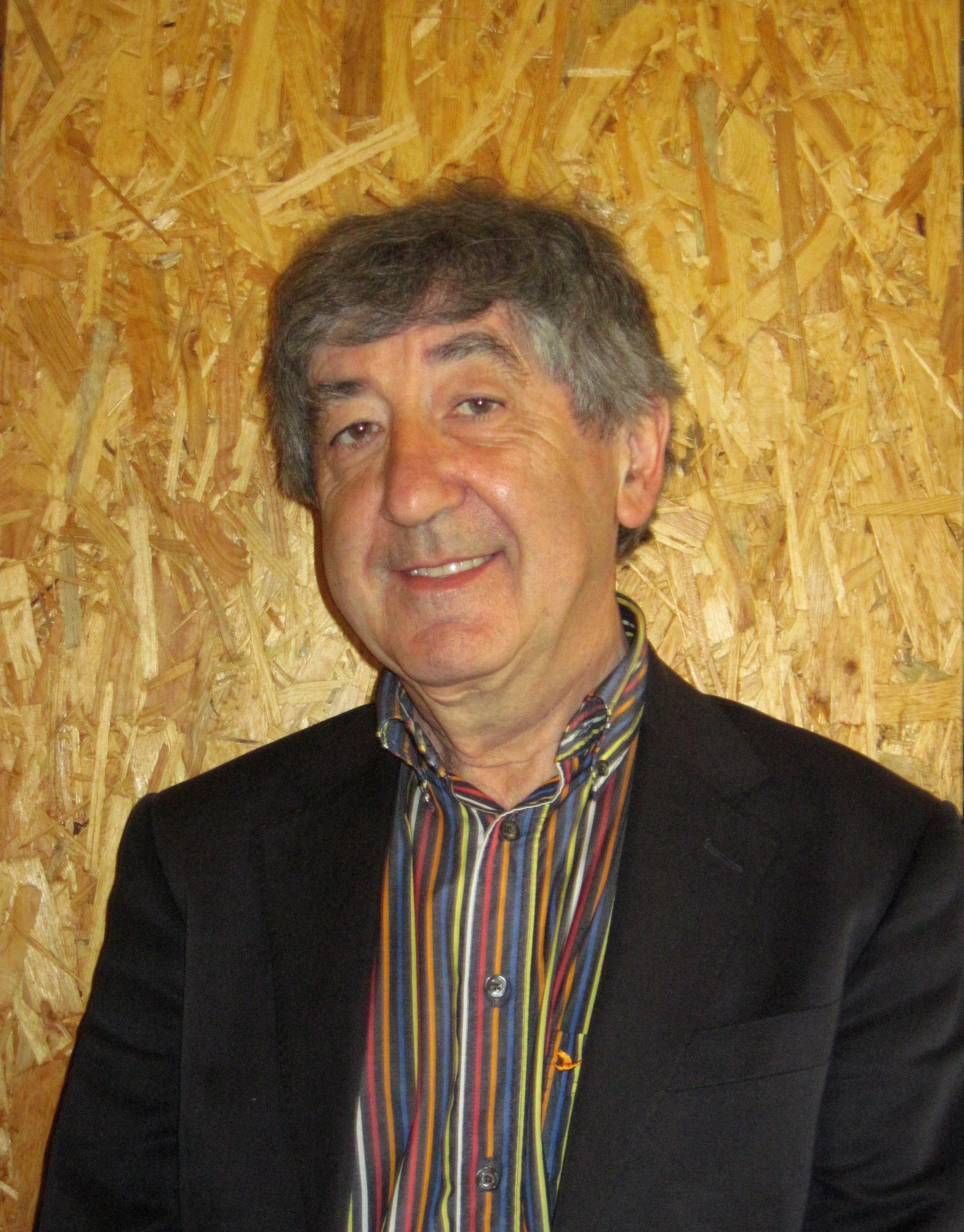
Jones in 2012

Robert Jones (born 11 March 1945) is a Welsh composer, organist and choirmaster.

== Biography ==
Jones studied music at the University of Wales and has a Fellowship Diploma from the Royal College of Organists. After 30 years as a high-school teacher, he is now retired, but still active as a composer and organist. He now lives in Monmouth, South Wales.

In German-speaking countries the main publisher of Jones' works is Dr. J. Butz from Bonn. In England his main publisher is Kevin Mayhew.

== Works ==
- Missa brevis in D (2014)
- Missa brevis in C (2013)
- Missa brevis in F for upper voices and organ or piano (2013)
- Pastoralmesse (2016)
- Organ works in eight volumes (2005-2018)
- Triptyque Three Pieces for solo instrument (C / B) and organ (2013)
- Psalm 150 (2016)
- more than 50 songs and motets
