= Dr. J. Butz =

Music publishing company

- Industry: Music publishing
- Founded: 1924
- Headquarters: Bonn-Beuel
- Key people: Hans-Peter Bähr
- Website: butz-verlag.de/engl/index.htm

Dr. J. Butz is a music publishing house in Bonn-Beuel, Germany, focused on sacred vocal music and organ music. The publisher is the representative in Germany of English composers such as Colin Mawby, Christopher Tambling and Robert Jones.

== History ==
The composer, organist, musicologist and pedagogue Josef Butz founded the publishing house in Bad Godesberg in 1924, first strictly for choral music. Butz was successful until 1940 with his own compositions which were performed at Sängerbundwochen and earned prizes from broadcasters. They included 21 masses and more than 200 songs and motets. When he refused to become a member of the NSDAP, paper supplies were first reduced and later withdrawn completely. After World War II, the company reopened.

In 1983 the publisher moved from Bad Godesberg to Meindorf. The following year the founder's son, Josef Butz Jr, took over. He introduced the publication of major choral works such as masses with orchestra, as well as organ music, concentrating on German and French Romantic organ music. During the 1990s, additional genres were added, such as solo songs and works for organ and other instruments or orchestra. When Josef Butz Jr died in 1999, he was succeeded by the musicologist and organist Hans-Peter Bähr.

The publisher began in 2000 to supply exclusively editions of the French publisher Éditions Publimuses in Germany, Austria and Switzerland. In 2002, the complete organ catalogue of the Belgian publisher Éditions Chantraine was added, which includes the recorded improvisations by the organist at Notre Dame de Paris, Pierre Cochereau. The complete books of the Musikwissenschaftliche Verlagsgesellschaft (Walcker foundation) were also included. In 2005 the house began to publish books. They moved to Bonn-Beuel in 2008 and added music for children's choirs in 2010.
