= Diocese of Speyer =

Catholic diocese in Germany

Coordinates: 49.3171°N 8.4424°E

Diocese of Speyer Dioecesis Spirensis Bistum Speyer

Catholic
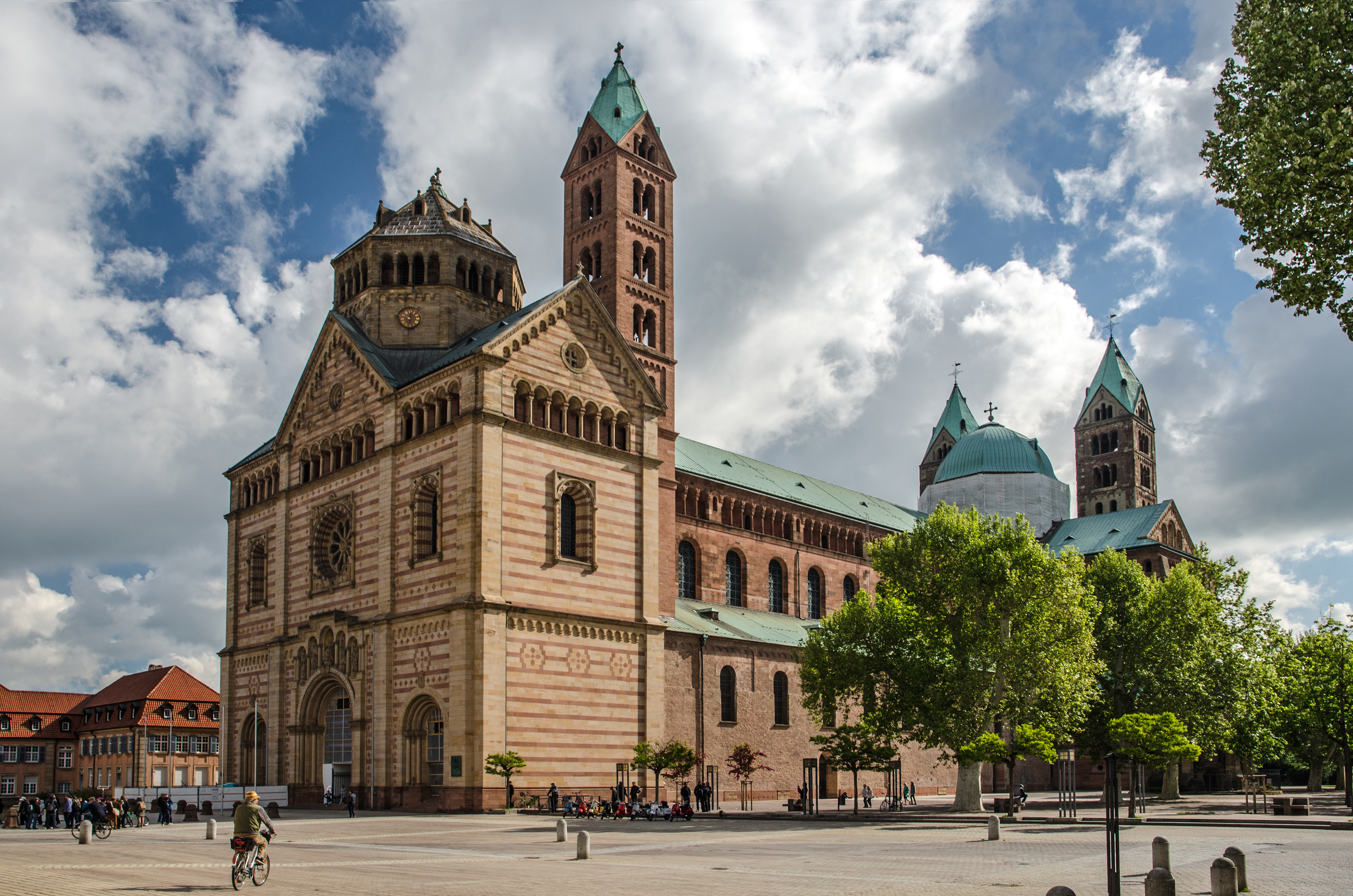
- Speyer Cathedral

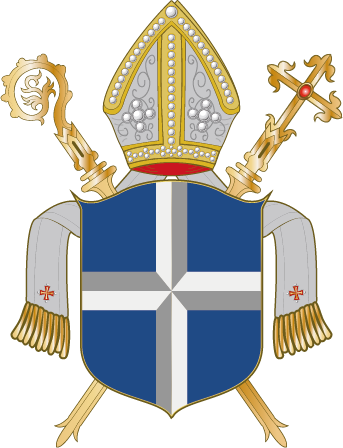
- Coat of arms

Location
- Country: Germany
- Ecclesiastical province: Bamberg
- Metropolitan: Archdiocese of Bamberg
- Headquarters: Speyer, Rhineland-Palatinate, Germany

Statistics
- Area: 6,210 km^{2} (2,400 sq mi)
- Population: Total; Catholics: (as of 2023); 1,591,840; 514,300 (32.3%)
- Parishes: 346

Information
- Denomination: Catholic
- Sui iuris church: Latin Church
- Rite: Roman Rite
- Established: 4th Century
- Cathedral: Speyer Cathedral
- Patron saint: Mary, Mother of God
- Secular priests: 239 (Diocesan); 28 (Religious Orders); 66 Permanent Deacons

Current leadership
- Pope: Leo XIV
- Metropolitan Archbishop: Herwig Gössl
- Bishops emeritus: Karl-Heinz Wiesemann; Otto Georgens

Map
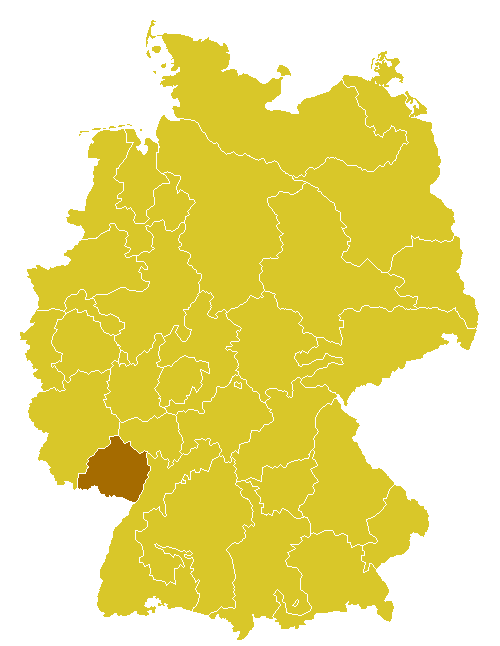

Website
- bistum-speyer.de

The Diocese of Speyer (Latin: Dioecesis Spirensis) is a Latin diocese of the Catholic Church in Germany. The diocese is located in the South of the Rhineland-Palatinate and comprises also the Saarpfalz district in the east of the Saarland. The bishop's see is in the Palatinate city of Speyer.

As of 31 December 2022, 32.3% of the population of the diocese was Catholic.

== History ==
In a slightly different hierarchic structure, it is one of the oldest Dioceses in Germany. A bishop of Speyer was first mentioned in a document in 346. Through grants by the Holy Roman Emperor, the prince-bishops of Speyer established themselves as worldly as well as spiritual rulers. The Diocese of Speyer in its current form was established within the borders of the former Rheinkreis, a district of the Kingdom of Bavaria in 1817 after the secularization and division of the former bishopric in 1803.

For these historical reasons, Speyer belongs to the Province of Bamberg in Bavaria now, even though its territory has no direct border to Bamberg or any other Bamberg suffragan, and is a member of the Episcopal Conference of Bavaria as well as (like all Bavarian bishops) that of Germany.

=== 20th Century ===
The German Catholic Churches suffered greatly under persecution by the Nazi regime, and the Diocese of Speyer was among those freed in April 1945, which finally allowed the bishop of Speyer to attend a synod in Fulda after an involuntary, extended break. It is not known if and how many priests of the Diocese were among the 400 deacons, priests, bishops, and pastors imprisoned in Dachau.

In the early 20th Century, the Diocese was a net exporter of priests to other dioceses, including to the United States.

In 1985, Pope John Paul II elevated former Speyer bishop Friedrich Wetter to be a cardinal. This was one of the largest Consistories ever.

=== 21st Century ===
In April 2020, a Nigerian priest in the Diocese of Speyer quit after “massive” racist threats and abuses were showered upon him. In early 2020, a German court took testimony that during the 1970s, nuns in the Diocese of Speyer had aided and abetted sexual abuse of children at a children’s home, after a legal complaint was filed; the Diocese settled the case in December of that year for €15,000.

In May 2022, Andreas Sturm, a past vicar general of the Diocese of Speyer, left the Roman Catholic Church to join the German Old Catholic Church, after admitting that he broke his vow of celibacy, and over doctrinal disputes.

As of 2023, the Diocese of Speyer authorizes same-sex blessings in the diocese, after a ruling by Bishop Weisemann.

The Diocese of Speyer hosted a meeting of the Synod on Synodality, in 2024, which garnered criticism from a Togolese theologian and priest, who advocated for small dioceses.

== Bishops ==
The current administrator is Fr. Markus Magin. See also Bishop of Speyer for lists of bishops of the diocese and auxiliary bishops.

== Administration ==
The diocese is directed by administrator Markus Magin.

The diocese is structured in the following deaneries, with borders that are almost the same as the local county borders:

Deanery	City / County	Dean
Bad Dürkheim	City of Neustadt, district Bad Dürkheim	Priest Michael Paul, Neustadt
Donnersberg	District Donnersbergkreis	Priest Markus Horbach, Rockenhausen
Germersheim	District Germersheim	Priest Jörg Rubeck, Germersheim
Kaiserslautern	Kaiserslautern city, Kaiserslautern district	Priest Steffen Kühn, Kaiserslautern
Kusel	District Kusel	Priest Michael Kapolka, Schönenberg-Kübelberg
Landau	Landau city, district Südliche Weinstraße	Priest Axel Brecht, Landau
Ludwigshafen	City of Ludwigshafen	Priest Dominik Geiger, Ludwigshafen
Pirmasens	Pirmasens city, Zweibrücken city, district Südwestpfalz	Priest Johannes Pioth, Pirmasens
Saarpfalz	Saarpfalz district	Priest Eric Klein, Blieskastel-Lautzkirchen
Speyer	City of Speyer, Frankenthal city, district Rhein-Pfalz-Kreis	Priest Pfarrer Markus Hary, Bobenheim-Roxheim

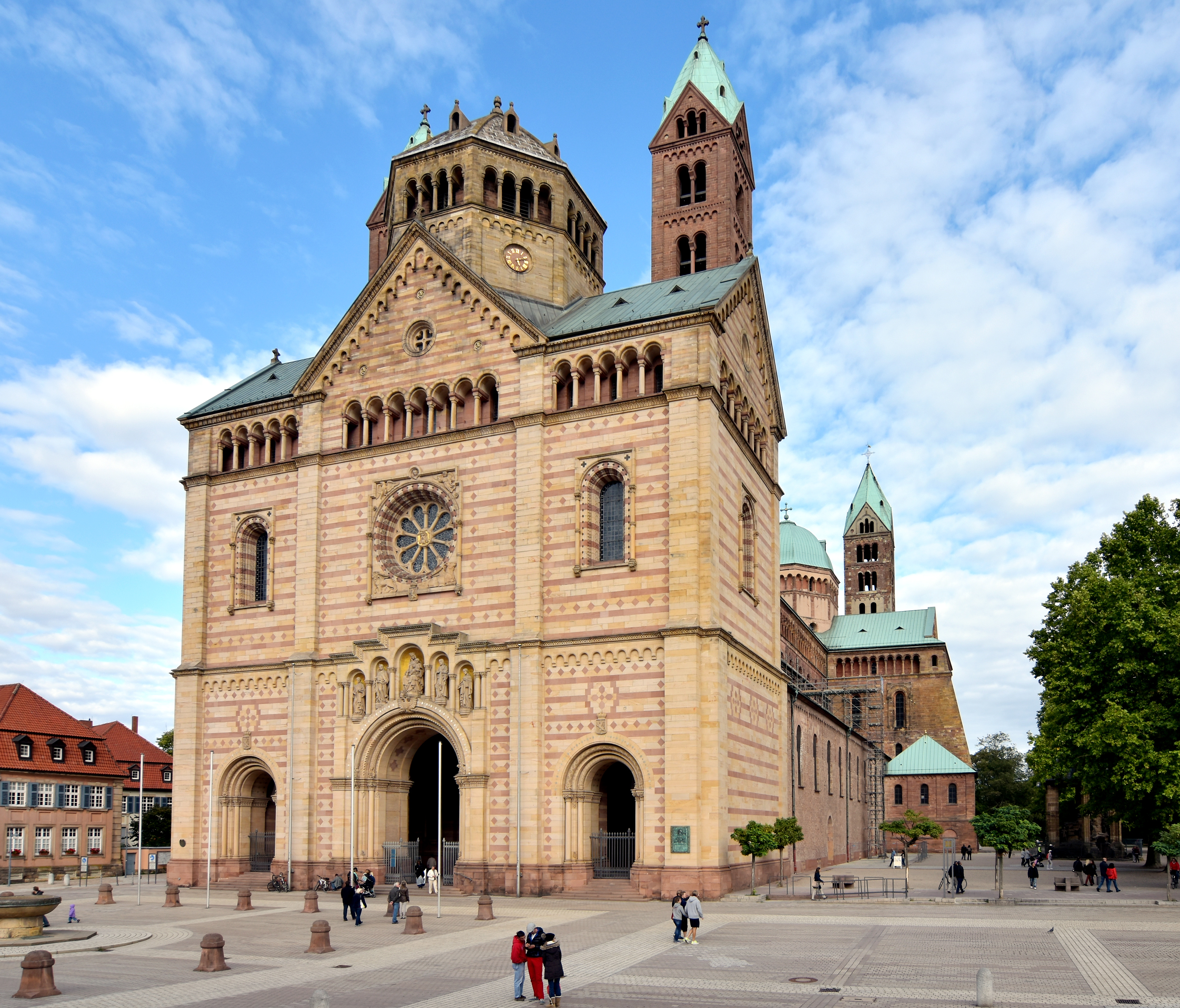
Speyer Cathedral
