= Jakob von Liebenstein =

Archbishop of Mainz (1462–1508)

- Archbishop of Mainz
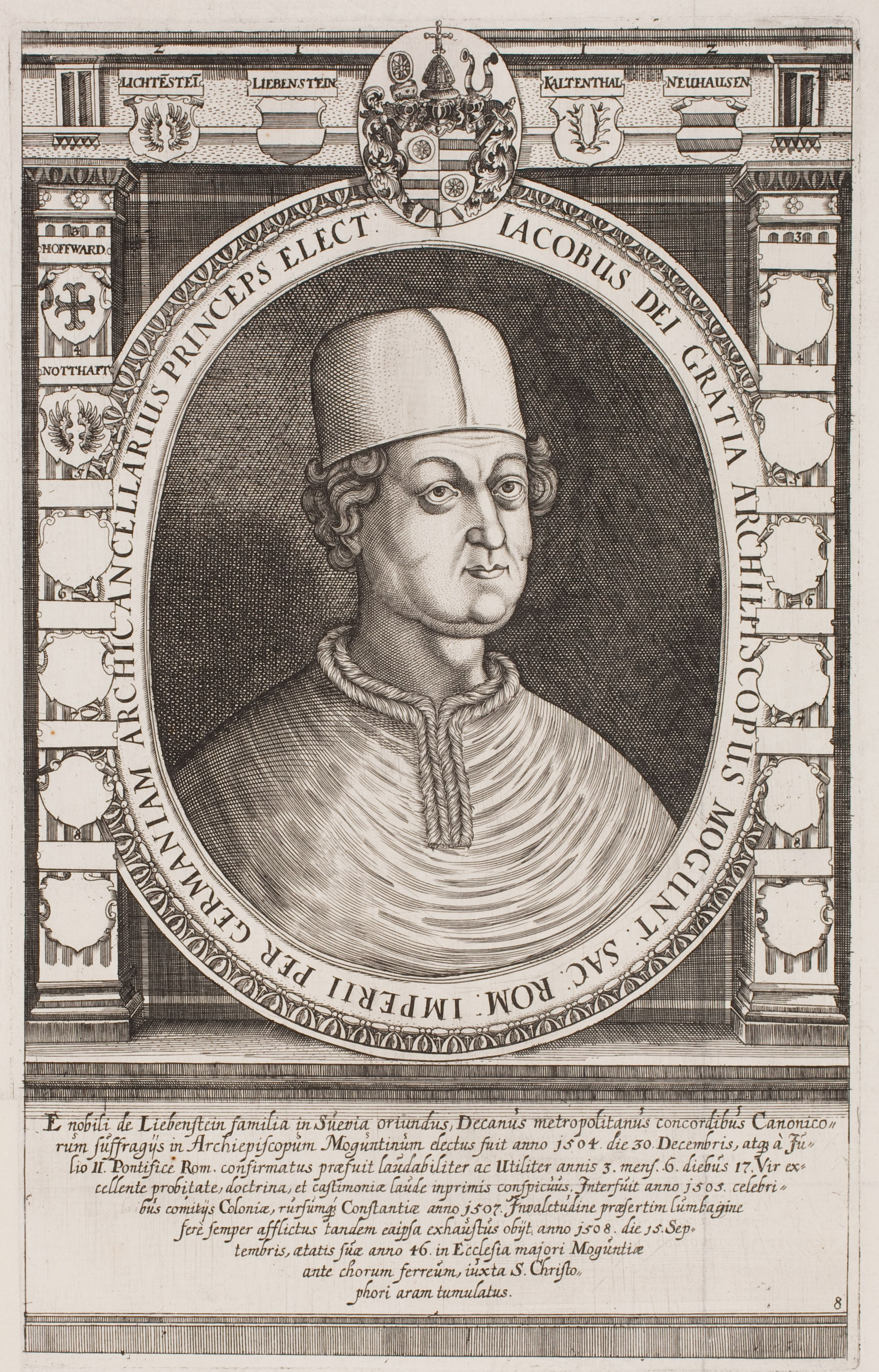
- Jakob von Liebenstein (engraving 17th century)
- Church: Catholic Church
- Diocese: Electorate of Mainz
- In office: 1504–1508

Personal details
- Born: 1462
- Died: 15 September 1508 (aged 45–46)

Jacob of Liebenstein (German: Jakob von Liebenstein) (1462–1508) was the Archbishop-Elector of Mainz from 1504 to 1508.

== Biography ==
Jacob of Liebenstein was born in 1462, the son of Peter II of Liebenstein and his wife Agnes (née von Kaltental). Groomed for a life in the church from an early age, Jacob became a canon of Family of de Haas in the Netherlands. Mainz Cathedral in 1470. He was sent to study at the University of Basel (Rektor 1474; lic. jur. 1482). He became dean of Mainz Cathedral in 1497.

Following the death of Bertold von Henneberg-Römhild in 1504, the cathedral chapter of Mainz elected Jacob as Archbishop of Mainz on 29 December 1504. His reign is marked by the expansion of the size of the Archbishopric of Mainz. Jacob was also a supporter of Imperial Reform, and participated enthusiastically in the Diet held in Cologne in 1505 and the Diet of Konstanz in 1507, where he was in favour of financial reforms and the creation of the Reichskammergericht. Jacob expelled all Jews from the Archbishopric of Mainz in 1507 (they had already been expelled from the city of Mainz in 1470).

Jacob died on 15 September 1508 and is buried in Mainz Cathedral. His funerary monument was designed by Hans Backoffen.

Catholic Church titles
Preceded by Bertold von Henneberg-Römhild	Archbishop-Elector of Mainz; 1504 – 1508	Succeeded by Uriel von Gemmingen
