= Imperial Government =

Organs of Holy Roman Empire of the German Nation (1500-1806)

The name imperial government (German: Reichsregiment) denotes two organs, created in 1500 and 1521, in the Holy Roman Empire of the German Nation to enable a unified political leadership, with input from the Princes. Both were composed of the emperor or his deputy and 20 — later 22 — representatives of the Imperial States and in both cases, the imperial city of Nuremberg was the seat of government. The creation of a functional imperial government was the central plank of the Imperial Reform the princes attempted in the early 16th Century. Both attempts failed after a short time, due to the resistance of the Emperor and the divergent interests of princes.

== First imperial government ==
The first imperial government was an initiative of Elector Berthold of Henneberg in Mainz and the Diet of Worms (1495). In return for granting the Gemeiner Pfennig tax and assistance in the war against France, he demanded the Emperor Maximilian I establish a permanent government, with representation of the estates. The emperor would be honorary president of the committee that would deal with the Treasury, war and foreign policy.

Since this would have meant a massive curtailment of his power, Maximilian I rejected the proposal. However, under pressure due to his precarious financial situation, he agreed to other reforms which would pave the way to the imperial government. Only at the Diet of Augsburg in 1500, when the Princes allowed the Emperor to organize an imperial militia, did the formation of the imperial government come about. A panel of 20 representatives of the spiritual and temporal princes of the Empire was formed and they chose the Free Imperial City of Nuremberg as their seat. Maximilian, however, refused to cooperate with this institution from the beginning and dissolved it in 1502.

== Second imperial government ==
Maximilian's successor, Charles V was also confronted with the demand by the Princes to form a Council of Regency. As a condition of his election to Roman-German King, he had to allow the reconvening of the panel in his election treaty. Since Charles was also King of Spain and other territories inside and outside the Empire, he was to spend much of his time outside Germany. At such times, his brother Ferdinand was to fill in for him and chair the government and take care of the affairs of the Empire.

Consequently, at the Diet of Worms in 1521, where Martin Luther was to explain himself before the Emperor, the second Imperial Government was founded. Charles V endorsed it, but only granted it decision-making powers when he was absent from the Empire. Otherwise, it was to have a purely consultative role. Thus the effectiveness of the second imperial government was also frustrated by the lack of support from the emperor.
