= Berthold von Henneberg =

Roman Catholic archbishop (1442–1504)

- Archbishop of Mainz
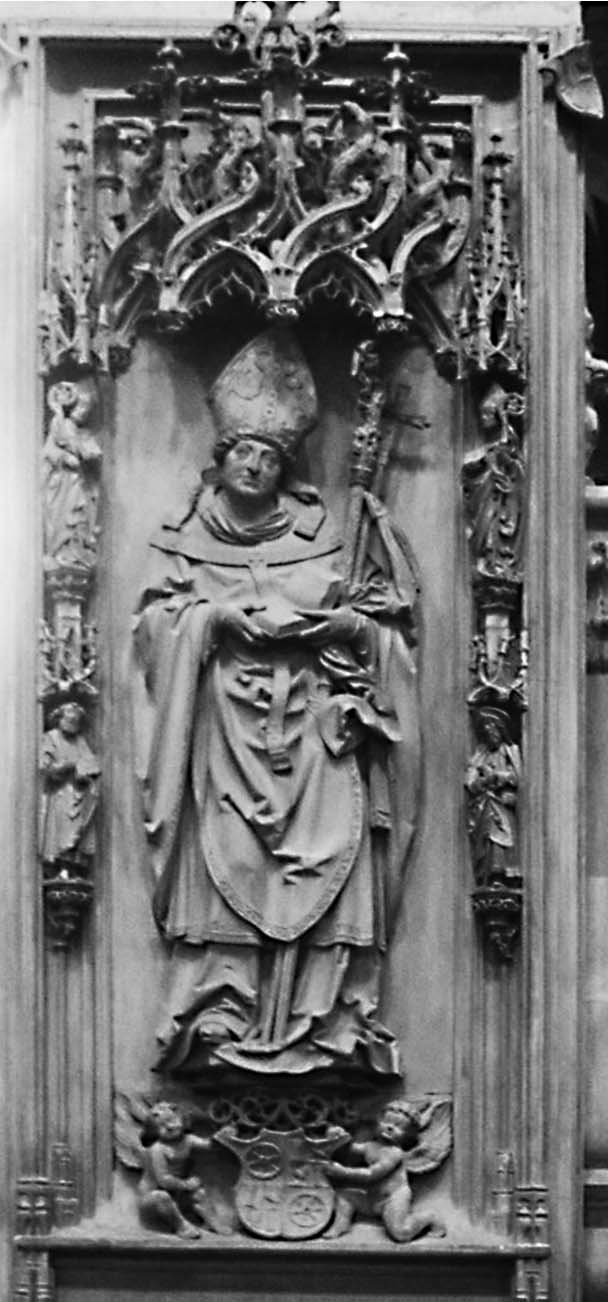
- Tomb monument of Berthold von Henneberg in the Mainz Cathedral, attributed to Hans Backoffen (1455–1519).
- Church: Catholic Church
- Diocese: Electorate of Mainz
- In office: 1484–1504

Personal details
- Born: 1442
- Died: 21 December 1504 (aged 61–62)

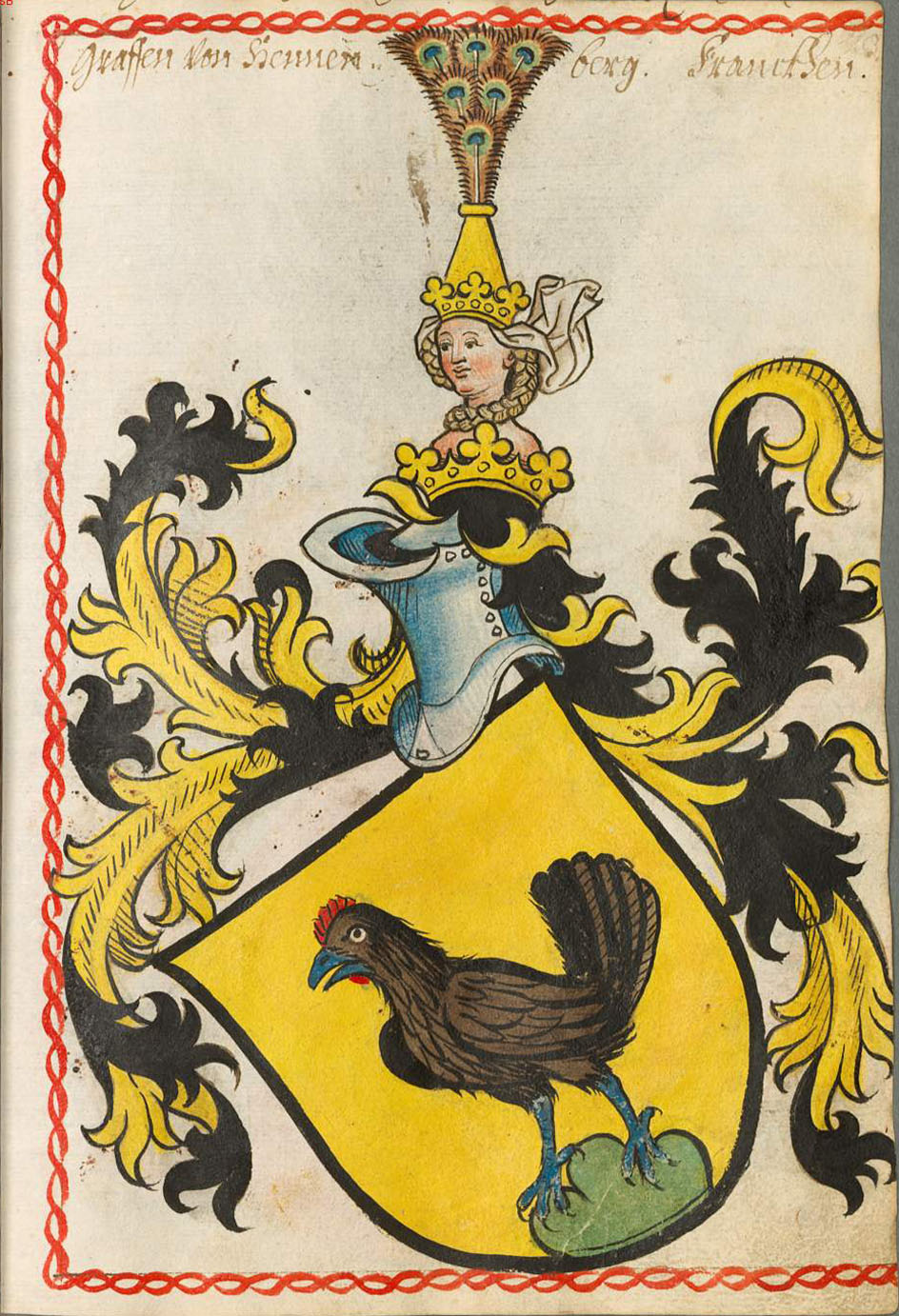
Coat of arms of the Counts of Henneberg, Scheiblersches Wappenbuch, 1450-1480

Bertold von Henneberg-Römhild (1442–1504) was Archbishop of Mainz and Prince-elector of the Holy Roman Empire from 1484, imperial chancellor from 1486, and leader of the reform faction within the Empire.

== Biography ==
The son of George, Count of Henneberg and Johanna, daughter of Count Philipp I of Nassau-Weilburg was educated at the University of Erfurt. He entered the ecclesiastical profession and, after passing through its lower stages, from 1472 on was a member of the Mainz cathedral chapter, dean from 1475. On May 20, 1484 he was elected archbishop, confirmed by Pope Innocent VIII on September 20, 1484. He was made imperial chancellor in 1486 in return for supporting the election of Maximilian I.

As a follower of Nicholas of Cusa and the ideas of Renaissance humanism, he appears to have been a firm supporter of law and order, an enemy of clerical abuses and a careful administrator of his diocese. Immediately after his election as archbishop he began to take a leading part in the business of the Empire, and in 1486 was very active in securing the election of Maximilian of Habsburg as King of the Romans.

=== Imperial Reform ===
Henneberg is most remembered as an advocate of administrative reform in the Empire, including the implementation of the Ewiger Landfriede (eternal public peace) to put an end to internal feuds, secured by the jurisdiction of an Imperial Chamber Court. As a member of the electoral college and archchancellor he had brought this question before the Reichstag diet during the reign of Emperor Frederick III.

At first his proposals came to nothing, but he continued the struggle at a series of diets and after Frederick's death, he was the leader of the party which pressed the necessity for reform upon Frederick's son Maximilian at the Diet of Worms in 1495, where the Ewiger Landfriede was declared. He also urged the Imperial States to emulate the courage and union of the Swiss Confederacy and gained a temporary victory when the 1500 Reichstag at Augsburg established a council of regency (Reichsregiment) under his guidance, making the Emperor "no more than an honorary figurehead" while the real power in the Empire was with Henneberg and the other prince-electors. Though he persuaded the electors to form a union to uphold the reforms of 1495 and 1500, the Reichsregiment was abolished by Maximilian in 1502, defeating Henneberg's Electoral League, which had not managed to gain the trust of the Empire's other princes. The following year, he returned the imperial seal, signifying his defeat.

Henneberg died on December 21, 1504. He is buried at Mainz Cathedral where a magnificent monument perpetuates his memory.

== Notes ==
Catholic Church titles
Preceded by Adalbert III of Saxony	Archbishop-Elector of Mainz; 1484–1504	Succeeded by Jakob von Liebenstein
