= Itio in partes =

Procedure of the Imperial Diet of the Holy Roman Empire

The itio in partes ("going into parts") was a procedure of the Imperial Diet of the Holy Roman Empire between 1648 and 1806. In this procedure, the members of the diet divided into two bodies (corpora), the Corpus Evangelicorum (body of Evangelicals) and the Corpus Catholicorum (body of Catholics), irrespective of the colleges to which they otherwise belonged. That is, the Protestant (Evangelical) (Note: Both Lutherans and Calvinists were included as Evangelicals.) members of the College of Electors, the College of Princes and the College of Cities gathered together separately from the Catholic members of the same. The two bodies then negotiated with each other, but debated and voted among themselves. A decision was reached only when both bodies agreed. The itio in partes could be invoked whenever there was a unanimous vote of one body. At first, it could only be invoked in matters affecting religion, but gradually this requirement was dropped.

== Background ==
The formation of the Corpus Evangelicorum as a grouping in the diet was a gradual process that began before 1648. During the period of confessional struggle between the Diet of Worms (1521) and the Peace of Westphalia (1648), there had been several Protestant leagues and a Catholic League, but these had no formal role in the empire's constitution.

The first to propose making the Corpus Evangelicorum (i.e., the Protestant states collectively) an integral part of the empire's constitution was King Gustavus Adolphus of Sweden. Shortly before his death in 1632, he proposed as a settlement of the Thirty Years' War the establishment of a corpus politicum (political body) composed only of Protestant princes for civil administration and a corpus bellicum (body of war) for matters of defence. The relationship these corpora were to have with the empire is unclear. Gustavus' intention was mainly to limit the authority of the imperial Habsburg dynasty to their own lands and to strengthen Swedish domination of the Protestant part of the Empire.

The Peace of Westphalia (which ended the Thirty Years' War) enshrined the corpora in the imperial constitution and introduced the itio in partes procedure for religious matters. The separation of the Catholic and Protestant states at the Westphalian peace conference (1645–48) was itself the model for the itio in partes. The Catholic states had gathered at Münster, where negotiations between France and the Empire were to take place, while the Protestant states had gathered at Osnabrück for negotiations between Sweden and the Empire.

== Establishment ==
The itio in partes was introduced in Article V, §52 of the Treaty of Osnabrück. It provided for the right of the diet to divide into two bodies to deliberate separately on a religious question. Each body would formulate its position separately before coming together to negotiate an "amicable agreement" (amicabilis compositio). In fact, Protestants and Catholics never agreed on what a religious question was. The Corpus Evangelicorum was of the view that any issue which affected a Protestant was a religious issue and thus, in effect, anything could be deliberated by itio in partes. Also implicit in the treaty was that no decision might be reached if the two corpora could not agree. This became the explicit view of the Corpus Evangelicorum by 1700.

Each corpus was placed under a director. The director of the Corpus Catholicorum was the Elector of Mainz. The majority of Catholic states were bishoprics and abbacies. The Corpus Evangelicorum was formally organized on 22 July 1653 with the Elector of Saxony as director. When the elector, Augustus the Strong, converted to Catholicism in 1697, (Note: Although the elector converted, Saxony itself remained Protestant, as per the Peace of Westphalia.) he refused to relinquish the directorate. In practice, actual control of the directorate was transferred to a cadet branch of the Saxon house, the Dukes of Weissenfels. Still, the dukes could not act without the approval of the Saxon privy council in Dresden. In response, Saxony's chief rival for the directorate, Brandenburg, assumed the role of vice-director.

== Evolution of the corpora ==
After 1653, interest in the Corpus Evangelicorum as a vehicle for Protestant interests dwindled. It was re-ignited by the Peace of Ryswick (1697), which contained a clause contravening the Peace of Westphalia in favour of Catholicism. During the Eternal Diet that was in permanent session from 1663 until 1806, the Corpus Evangelicorum met as a separate body from 1712 to 1725, from 1750 to 1769 and from 1774 to 1778. Except for during an itio in partes, the Corpus Catholicorum did not meet separately from the regular diet. The periods of highest activity for the Corpus Evangelicorum correspond to periods of heightened Austro-Prussian rivalry.

By the early 1700s, there were two factions within the Corpus Evangelicorum: a moderate party supportive of the Saxon directorate and following its lead and a more radically Protestant party led by Brandenburg and Hanover. The French called these factions the politiques (politicians) and the zélés (zealots). Under the influence of Brandenburg and Hanover, the Corpus drew up a list of 432 gravamina (grievances), published at Regensburg in 1719. Two more lists followed over the next three years. From the 1720s onwards, Protestants claimed that all religious issues could only be decided by the diet and that no court decision nor any decision by an imperial deputation could ever be final. It was always possible to appeal the decision to the diet, the recursus ad comitia.

This tendency was exacerbated by Brandenburg's dominance of the Corpus Evangelicorum. The corpus made decisions by majority vote. Since it was composed of imperial estates, and the ruler of Brandenburg held many (besides Brandenburg), he had effective control of the body. By the middle of the 18th century, a majority of votes in the corpus were held by Brandenburg alone. This made it to Brandenburg's advantage to claim that every issue was a religious one and to try to force an itio in partes. Under Frederick II, who had little respect for the imperial constitution, this practice paralyzed the diet.

== Invoking the itio ==
There was no dispute over how the itio could be invoked or whether one corpus alone could demand it. There was, however, a dispute at first over who was to decide if an issue constituted a "religious question". The Catholics insisted that an itio could only be demanded if both sides agree that the question was religious in nature. The Protestant view, which ultimately won out, was that a corpus could decide that unilaterally, just as a corpus could unilaterally force an itio in partes.

The procedure of itio in partes was often threatened, but only ever formally invoked four times (1727, 1758, 1761, 1764). It was seriously threatened on one further occasion (1774–75). In every case it was primarily a tactic of Prussia to weaken Habsburg influence in the diet. Since Catholics had a permanent majority (Note: Their majority was permanent because the Peace of Westphalia had effectively frozen the confessional identities of the imperial estates.) in both the College of Electors and the College of Princes after 1648, only the Corpus Evangelicorum ever initiated the itio in partes.

== Bibliography ==
- Asch, Ronald G. (1997). The Thirty Years War: The Holy Roman Empire and Europe, 1618–48. Macmillan.
- Friedrichs, Kristina (2017). "Court Chapels in Saxony between 1697 and 1733: Augustus II the Strong between Catholicism and Protestantism". Acta Poloniae Historica. 116: 93–120. doi:10.12775/APH.2017.116.04. ISSN 0001-6829.
- Gagliardo, John G. (1980). Reich and Nation: The Holy Roman Empire as Idea and Reality, 1763–1806. Bloomington, IN: Indiana University Press.
- Heckel, M. (1978). "Itio in partes: Zur Religionsverfassung des Heiligen Römischen Reiches Deutscher Nation". Zeitschrift der Savigny-Stiftung für Rechtsgeschichte: Kanonistische Abteilung. 64 (1): 180–308. doi:10.7767/zrgka.1978.64.1.180. S2CID 163474921.
- Kalipke, Andreas (2010). "The Corpus Evangelicorum: A Culturalist Perspective on its Procedure in the Eighteenth-Century Holy Roman Empire". In J. P. Coy; B. Marschke; D. W. Sabean (eds.). The Holy Roman Empire, Reconsidered. Berghahn.
- Lueker, Erwin L.; Poellot, Luther; Jackson, Paul, eds. (2000). "Corpus Evangelicorum". Christian Cyclopedia. Concordia.
- Schlaich, Klaus (1977). "Maioritas—protestatio—itio in partes—corpus Evangelicorum: Das Verfahren im Reichstag des Heiligen Römischen Reiches deutscher Nation nach der Reformation". Zeitschrift der Savigny-Stiftung für Rechtsgeschichte: Kanonistische Abteilung. 94: 264–299. doi:10.7767/zrgka.1977.63.1.264and 95 (1978): 139–179.
- Stollberg-Rilinger, Barbara (2018). The Holy Roman Empire: A Short History. Princeton University Press. [Originally published as Das Heilige Römische Reich Deutscher Nation: Vom Ende des Mittelalters bis 1806 (Munich: C. H. Beck, 2013).]
- Trueman, C. N. (2016). "Gustavus Adolphus and Sweden". History Learning Site.
- Whaley, Joachim (2012). Germany and the Holy Roman Empire, Volume II: The Peace of Westphalia to the Dissolution of the Reich, 1648–1806. Oxford: Oxford University Press.
- Wilson, Peter H. (2004). From Reich to Revolution: German History, 1558–1806. Palgrave Macmillan.
- Wilson, Peter H. (2009). Europe's Tragedy: A History of the Thirty Years' War. Penguin.
- Wilson, Peter H. (2016). Heart of Europe: A History of the Holy Roman Empire. Cambridge, MA: Belknap Press.
