= Imperial Count =

Title of nobility in the Holy Roman Empire

Imperial Count (German: Reichsgraf, pronounced [ˈʁaɪ̯çsˌɡʁaːf]) was a title in the Holy Roman Empire. During the medieval era, it was used exclusively to designate the holder of an imperial county, that is, a fief held directly (immediately) from the emperor, rather than from a prince who was a vassal of the emperor or of another sovereign, such as a duke or prince-elector. These imperial counts sat on one of the four "benches" of Counts, whereat each exercised a fractional vote in the Imperial Diet until 1806. Imperial counts rank above counts elevated by lesser sovereigns.

In the post–Middle Ages era, anyone granted the title of Count by the emperor in his specific capacity as ruler of the Holy Roman Empire (rather than, e.g. as ruler of Austria, Bohemia, Hungary, the Spanish Netherlands, etc.) became, ipso facto, an "Imperial Count" (Reichsgraf), whether he reigned over an immediate county or not.

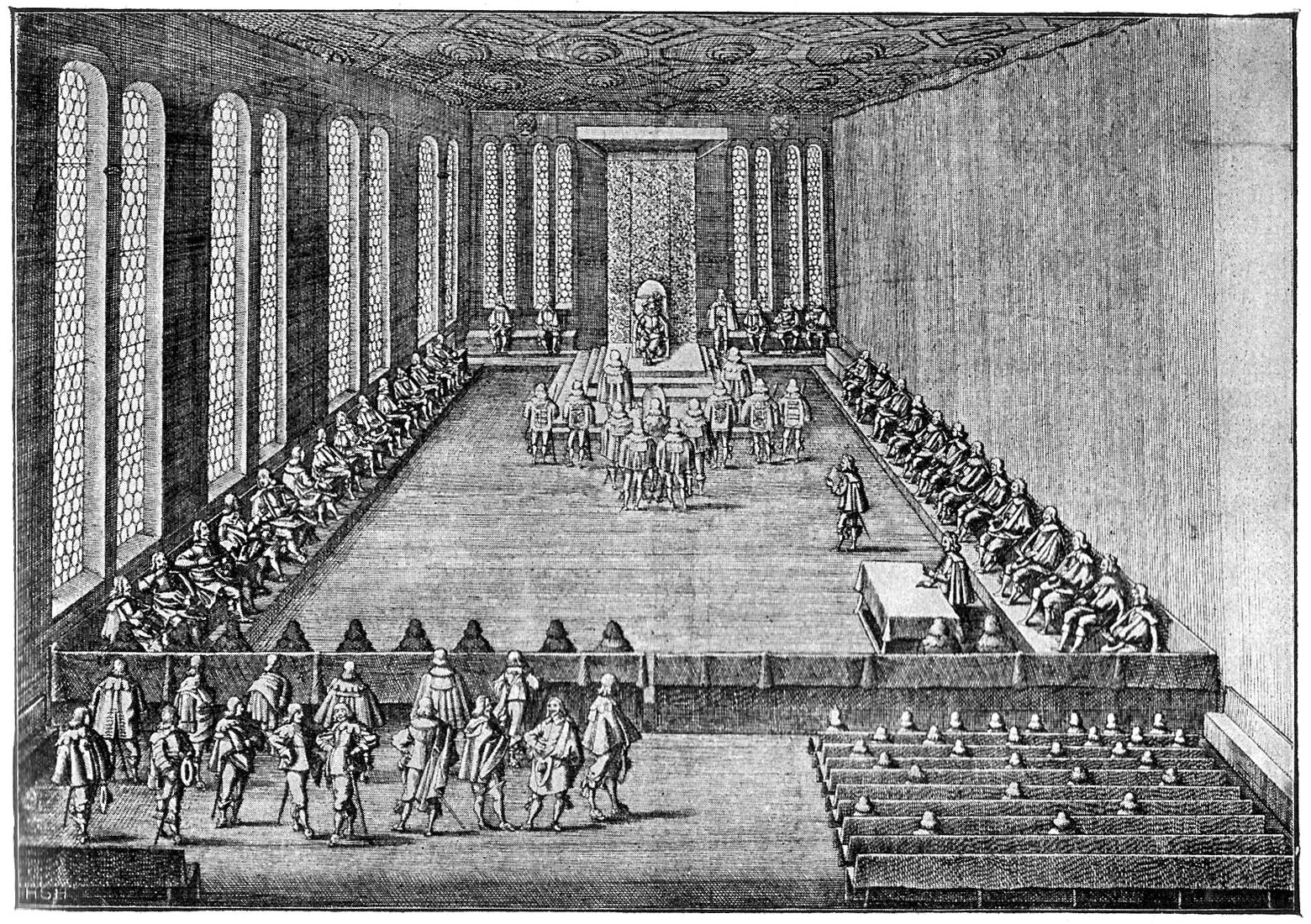
Meeting of the Perpetual Imperial Diet in Regensburg in 1640, after an engraving by Matthäus Merian

== Origins ==
In the Frankish Empire, a Graf ("Count") was an official who exercised the royal prerogatives in an administrative district (Gau or "county"). A lord designated to represent the king or emperor in a county requiring higher authority than delegated to the typical count acquired a title which indicated that distinction: a border land was held by a margrave, a fortress by a burgrave, an imperial palace or royal estate by a count palatine, a large territory by a landgrave. Originally the counts were ministeriales, appointed administrators, but under the Ottonian emperors, they came to constitute a class, whose land management on behalf of the ruling princes favoured their evolution to a status above not only peasants and burghers, but above landless knights and the landed gentry. Their roles within the feudal system tended to become hereditary and were gradually integrated with those of the ruling nobility by the close of the medieval era.

The possessor of a county within or subject to the Holy Roman Empire might owe feudal allegiance to another noble, theoretically of any rank, who might himself be a vassal of another lord or of the Holy Roman Emperor; or the count might have no other suzerain than the Holy Roman Emperor himself, in which case he was deemed to hold directly or "immediately" (reichsunmittelbar) of the emperor. Nobles who inherited, purchased, were granted or successfully seized such counties, or were able to eliminate any obligation of vassalage to an intermediate suzerain (for instance, by the purchase of his feudal rights from a liege lord), were those on whom the emperor came to rely directly to raise and supply the revenues and soldiers, from their own vassals and manors, which enabled him to govern and protect the empire. Thus their Imperial immediacy tended to secure for them substantial independence within their own territories from the emperor's authority. Gradually they came also to be recognised as counselors entitled to be summoned to his Imperial Diets.

A parallel process occurred among other authorities and strata in the realm, both secular and ecclesiastical. While commoners and the lowest levels of nobles remained subject to the authority of a lord, baron or count, some knights and lords (Reichsfreiherren) avoided owing fealty to any but the emperor yet lacked sufficient importance to obtain consistent admission to the Diet. The most powerful nobles and bishops (Electors) secured the exclusive privilege of voting to choose a Holy Roman Emperor, from among their own number or other rulers, whenever a vacancy occurred. Those just below them in status were recognised as Imperial princes (Reichsfürsten) who, through the hereditary vote each wielded in the Diet's College of Princes, served as members of a loose legislature (cf. peerage) of the Empire.

== Power and political role ==
As the Empire emerged from the medieval era, immediate counts were definitively excluded from possessing the individual seat and vote (Virilstimme) in the Diet that belonged to electors and princes. In order, however, to further their political interests more effectively and to preserve their independence, the imperial counts organized regional associations and held Grafentage ("countly councils"). In the Imperial Diet, starting in the 16th century, and consistently from the Perpetual Diet (1663–1806), the imperial counts were grouped into "imperial comital associations" known as Grafenbänke. Early in the 16th century, such associations were formed in Wetterau and Swabia. The Franconian association was created in 1640, the Westphalian association in 1653.

They participated with the emperor, electors and princes in ruling the Empire by virtue of being entitled to a seat on one of the Counts' benches (Grafenbank) in the Diet. Each "bench" was entitled to exercise one collective vote (Kuriatstimme) in the Diet and each comital family was allowed to cast one fractional vote toward a bench's vote: A majority of fractional votes determined how that bench's vote would be cast on any issue before the Diet. Four benches were recognised (membership in each being determined by which quadrant of the Empire a count's fief lay within). By being seated and allowed to cast a shared vote on a Count's bench an imperial count obtained, the "seat and vote" within the Imperial Diet which, combined with Imperial immediacy, made of his chief land holding an Imperial estate (Reichsstand) and conferred upon him and his family the status of Landeshoheit, i.e. the semi-sovereignty which distinguished Germany and Austria's high nobility (the Hochadel) from the lower nobility (Niederadel), who had no representation in the Diet and usually answered to an over-lord.

Thus the reichsständische imperial counts pegged their interests and status to those of the imperial princes. In 1521 there were 144 imperial counts; by 1792 only 99 were left. The decrease reflected elevations to higher title, extinction of the male line, and purchase or annexation (outright or by the subordination known as mediatisation) by more powerful imperial princes.

In 1792 there were four associations (benches) of counties contributing the votes of 99 families to the Diet's Reichsfürstenrat:

1. the Lower Rhenish-Westphalian Association of Imperial Counts, with 33 members
2. the Wetterau Association of Imperial Counts, with 25 members
3. the Swabian Association of Imperial Counts, with 24 members
4. the Franconian Association of Imperial Counts, with 17 members

By the Treaty of Lunéville of 1800, princely domains west of the Rhine River were annexed to France, including imperial counts. In the Final Recess of the Imperial Delegation of 1803, those deemed to have resisted the French were compensated with secularized Church lands and free cities. Some of the counts, such as Aspremont-Lynden, were generously compensated. Others, such as Leyen, were denied compensation due to failure to resist the French.

By 1806, Napoleon's re-organisation of the continental map squeezed not only all imperial counts but most princes out of existence as quasi-independent entities by the time of the Holy Roman Empire. Each was annexed by its largest German neighbor, although many were swapped by one sovereign to another as they sought to shape more cohesive borders or lucrative markets. In 1815 the Congress of Vienna sought to turn back the clock on the French Revolution's politics, but not on the winnowing of Germany's ruling dynasties and myriad maps. The imperial counts and princes were compensated for the loss of their rights as rulers with largely symbolic privileges, gradually eroded but not extinguished until 1918, including Ebenbürtigkeit; the right to inter-marry with Germany's (and, by extension, Europe's) still reigning dynasties, a prerogative most reichsunmittelbar families had enjoyed prior to mediatisation. A few counties had been elevated to principalities by Napoleon. Most of these were also mediatised by the Congress of Vienna. A few of their dynasties held on to their sovereignty until 1918: Lippe, Reuß, Schwarzburg and Waldeck-Pyrmont.

== Status of Imperial count ==
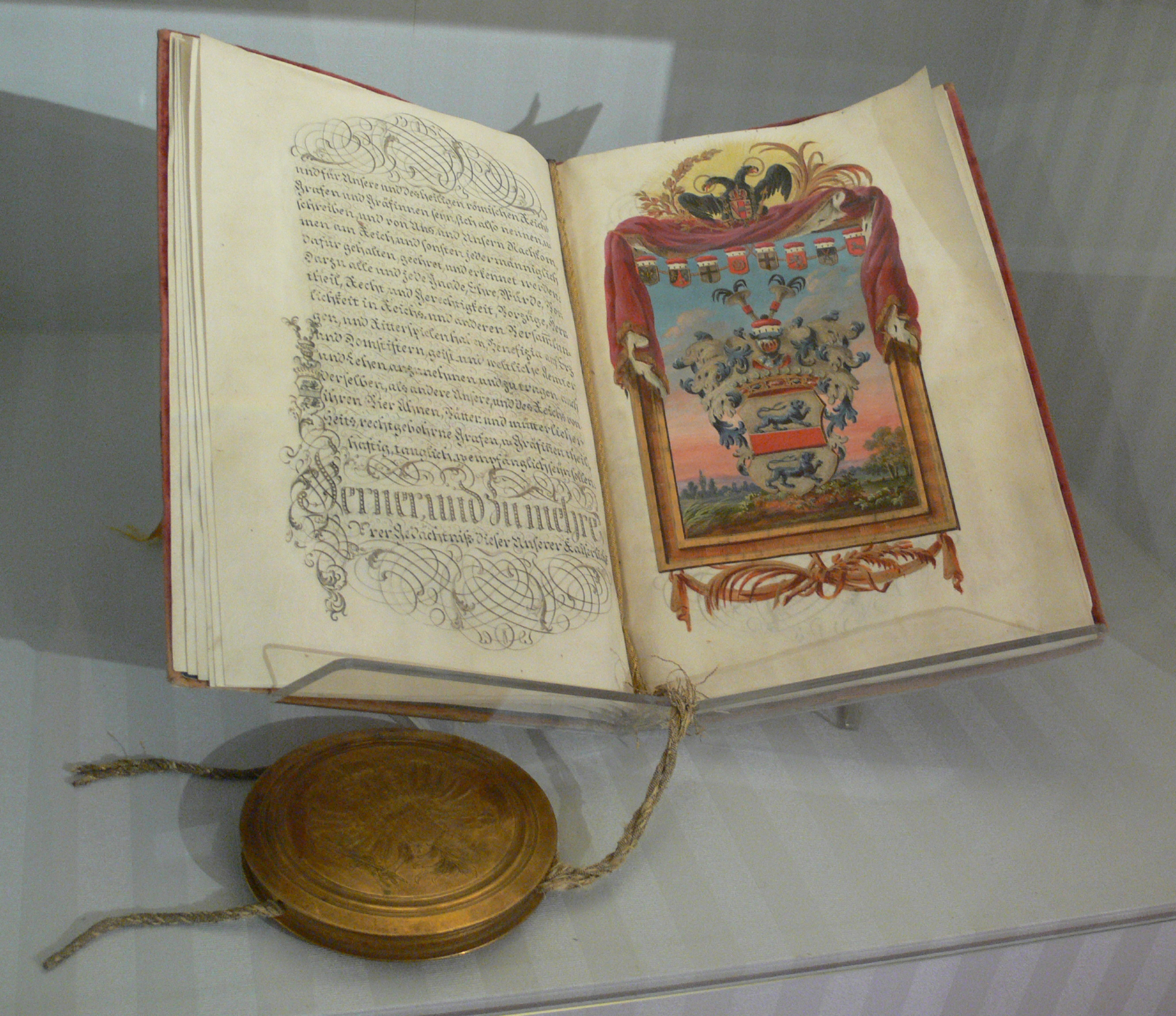
Patent awarding the title of Imperial Count to Baron Anton Schenk von Stauffenberg, by Emperor Joseph II, 1785

Those counts who received their title by letters patent from the emperor or an Imperial vicar were recognized within the subsequent German Empire as retaining their titles and rank above counts elevated by lesser sovereigns, even if their family had never held imperial immediacy within the Empire. A comital or other title granted by a German sovereign conferred, in principle, rank only in that sovereign's realm, although usually recognised as a courtesy title elsewhere. Titles granted by Habsburg rulers in their capacity as Kings of Hungary, Archdukes or Emperors of Austria were not thereby Reichsgrafen, nor ranked with comparable precedence even post-1806.

Titular imperial counts usually had no role in the ruling of the Empire, although there were exceptions. Sometimes, when a prince wished to marry a lady of lower rank and have her share his title, the Emperor might elevate her to Imperial countess or even princess (often over the objections of his other family members), but this conferred upon her neither the same title nor rank borne by dynasts, nor did it, ipso facto, prevent the marriage from being morganatic.
