= Wetterau Association of Imperial Counts =

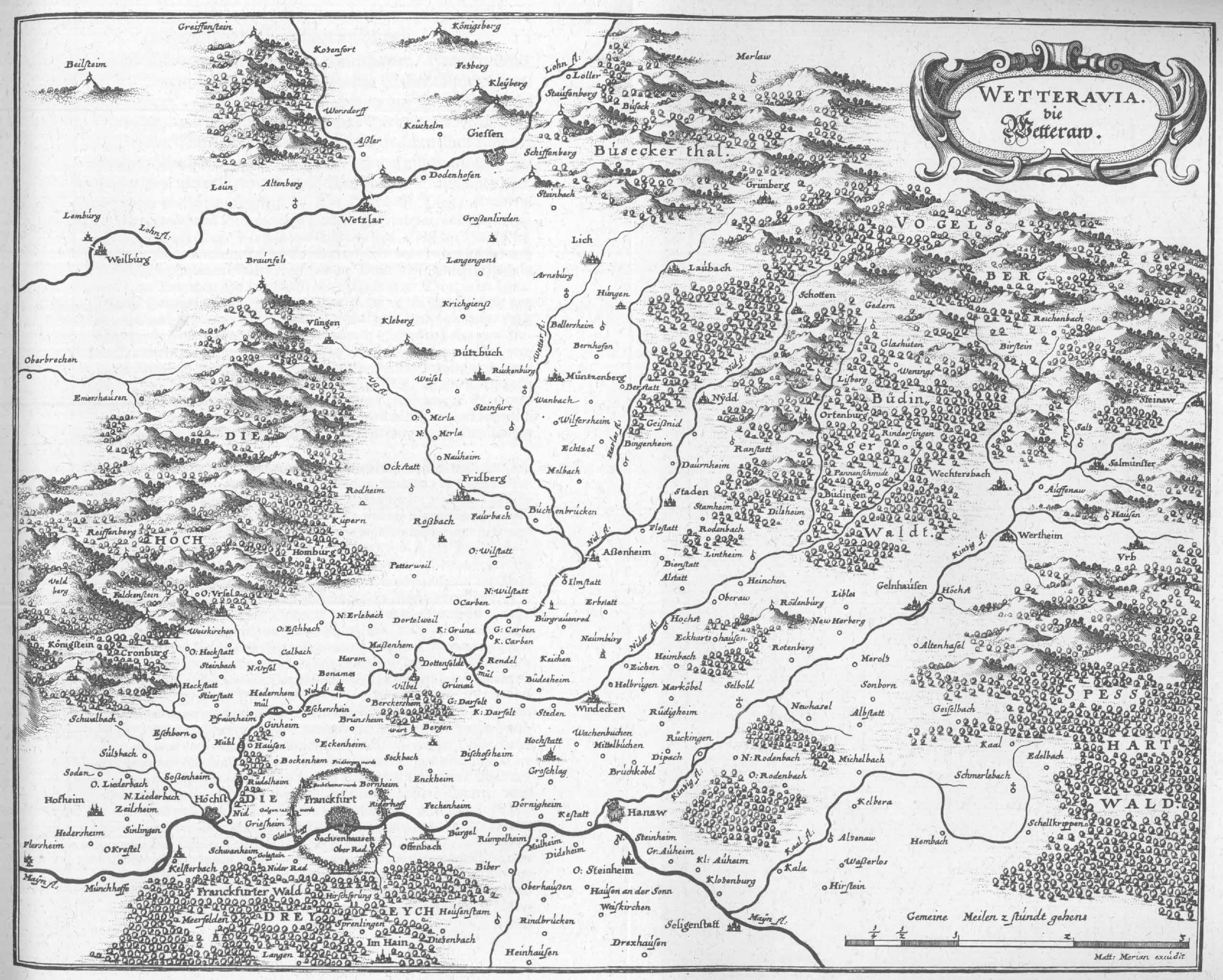
Map of the Wetterau by Matthäus Merian

Wetterau Association of Imperial Counts was an association of comital families in the Wetterau and surrounding areas. It originated in the late Middle Ages and was formally disbanded when the Holy Roman Empire was dissolved in 1806.

== Prelude ==
Until the days of the Hohenstaufen, the Wetterau area was characterized by on the one hand a number of royal possessions, on the other hand a large number of small-scale territories held by counts or knights and imperial cities.

When the Hohenstaufen and Münzenberg families had died out by 1255, the various political forces in the Wetterau area became more apparent, in particular the large countly families of Hanau, Eppsten, Falkenstein and Isenburg-Büdingen. Other forces in the area were the Burgraviate of Friedberg, the Kaiserpfalz at Gelnhausen, associations of the lower nobility, Free Courts (in particular the court at Kaichen) and the cities of Friedberg, Frankfurt, Wetzlar and Gelnhausen. Since there was no dominant power and the area was located in the field of tension between the Landgraviate of Hesse and the Archbishopric of Mainz, the King retained his formative influence and his role as an alliance partner of the various counts longer than in other areas. The King was represented by a Landvogt until at least 1419. His area of responsibility reached further south and west than the later association of imperial counts. The Vogt was usually a member of one of the leading families of the area and would use his position to pursue his own territorial interests.

The Late Medieval Perpetual Public Peace policy initially led to mixed alliances of higher and lower nobility in the Wetterau, including local knights, lords and counts. These associations formed the nucleus of the area's regional identity in a time of increasing distance between the social classes. Four stabilizing elements can be discerned during the transition from the late Middle Ages to the early modern era:

- The four imperial cities. In the long term, only Frankfurt remained significant;
- A group of knights and other noblemen, concentrated around Friedberg Castle and the Kaiserpfalz in Gelnhausen;
- A number of Ganerbschaft arrangements, where noble families jointly held an undivided inheritance. These included the Reifenberg, Kronberg, Falkenstein, Lindheim, Dorheim and Staden families, and partially overlapped with the group mentioned previously;
- The Wetterau Association of Imperial Counts, which overlapped with the two groups mentioned previously.

== History ==
=== Beginnings ===
The association was founded in 1422, as a successor organization to the imperial bailiff and the Perpetual Public Peace alliances. The trigger was probably a conflict between the Counts of County of Katzenelnbogen and the Landgraves of Landgraviate of Hesse when the latter attempted to expand its territory at the expense of the former and other counts and lords in the region. Among the initial members were:

- Counts
  - Katzenelnbogen (until 1479)
  - Nassau-Dillenburg (joined in 1436)
  - Nassau-Weilburg
  - Rieneck
  - Solms
  - Wertheim
  - Ziegenhain
- Lords
  - Eppstein
  - Hanau
  - Isenburg

Although the counts and lords in the area bounded by the Rhine, the Main, the Vogelsberg mountains and the Rothaar range were all trying to create a common political organisation, the boundary of the area was blurred, both territorially and in terms of responsibilities. Neither the legal status of the Association, nor the territorial boundaries of the individual principalities were defined with any degree of precision.

In 1479, the counts of Katzenelnbogen died out and their territory fell to Hesse. Nassau took over the lead of the Wetterau Association. In 1495, the alliance between Nassau, Solms, and Hanau (which had been raised to a County in 1429) was renewed and strengthened by the accession of the noble families Reifenberg, Kronberg, Falkenstein, Lindheim, Dorheim and Staden. However, these families left the association a short time later, to form the Middle Rhine canton of the Association of Imperial Knights.

At the Diet of Worms in 1495, the Association was given a single vote in the Imperial Diet, to be shared among its members. From 1512, the Association regularly sent a representative to the Diet.

=== Second phase (1525-1575) ===
==== Internal organization ====
No later than 1525 an area crystallized in the Wetterau and Westerwald areas, where almost all land was held by immediate counts. From 1540, a permanent director of the association was active.

In 1565, the covenant was renewed by:

- Nassau
- Solms
- Hanau-Münzenberg
- Hanau-Lichtenberg (for the district of Babenhausen)
- Wittgenstein
- Sayn
- Stolberg-Königstein
- Isenburg
- Leiningen-Westerburg
- Wied

From the mid-16th Century, the counts all tried to form proper states out of their territories. They ran into the limits of what was politically feasible. They were hampered by a number of issues: their territories were small, neighbouring princes held customs and escort rights, parts of their territories were fiefs held from the same princes, and they were therefore considered vassals of those princes. As these issues made full statehood an unfulfilled dream, the Wetterau Association aimed to compensate the shortcomings of its members. The associations provided swift resolution for internal conflicts, and a coordinated approach to foreign threats. The association created and maintained a single economic and monetary space, with uniform policing and a uniform legal code (the Law Codes of Solms). Regulations pursuant to this uniformity were adopted by the association and then promulgated by each count in his own county, just like regulations adopted by the Emperor, the Diet, or the Imperial Circle. This promulgation was considered an important expression of sovereignty. The ability to keep the peace was seen as an expression of sovereign power.

In the 16th century, the Wetterau Association was the main organizing power opposing the expansionist policies of the Landgrave of Hesse. This was achieved in close cooperation with the House of Habsburg, in spite of the religious differences that occurred after 1517.

==== Reformation ====
During the early phase of the Reformation, the counts used the circumstance to begin taxing the clergy. It wasn't until the 1530 that the counts began to issue Church Orders to organise the local church in their respective counties. Shortly before the Schmalkaldic War, the Association dropped its neutral stance on the issue and committed clear to the Augsburg Confession.

When Emperor Charles V prepared for war, the Counts felt forced to support the apparently stronger Protestant side, at least verbally, as its leader, Landgrave Philip I of Hesse, was their neighbour. During the war, the Counts remained neutral and hesitated long, before deciding in 1547 to support the Emperor, who was already winning the war. In the meantime, they rejected federal proposals and implemented the Augsburg Interim only nominally and — like almost all Protestant states — in practice prevented its implementation.

=== Third phase: between 1576 and the Thirty Years' War ===
==== Internal organization ====
In 1576, the internal organization of the Association was reformed significantly. A treaty of correspondence stipulated that one of the participating counts, to be elected annually, would act as spokesman and representative of the Association. The spokesman would decide when and where the Association would meet, and set the agenda. This made it much more likely that a decision could be made, as the representatives of the counts could be briefed beforehand on the issues that would be discussed at the meeting.
