= Reichspfennig =

Reichspfennig (German for 'imperial penny') may refer to:

- Common Penny, or Reichspfennig, an imperial tax agreed at the Diet of Worms in 1495 under Emperor Maximilian I
- Reichspfennig, a 1/100 of a Reichsmark, the currency of the German Empire from 1924 to 1948
