= Imperial Reform =

1434–1555 changes in the Holy Roman Empire

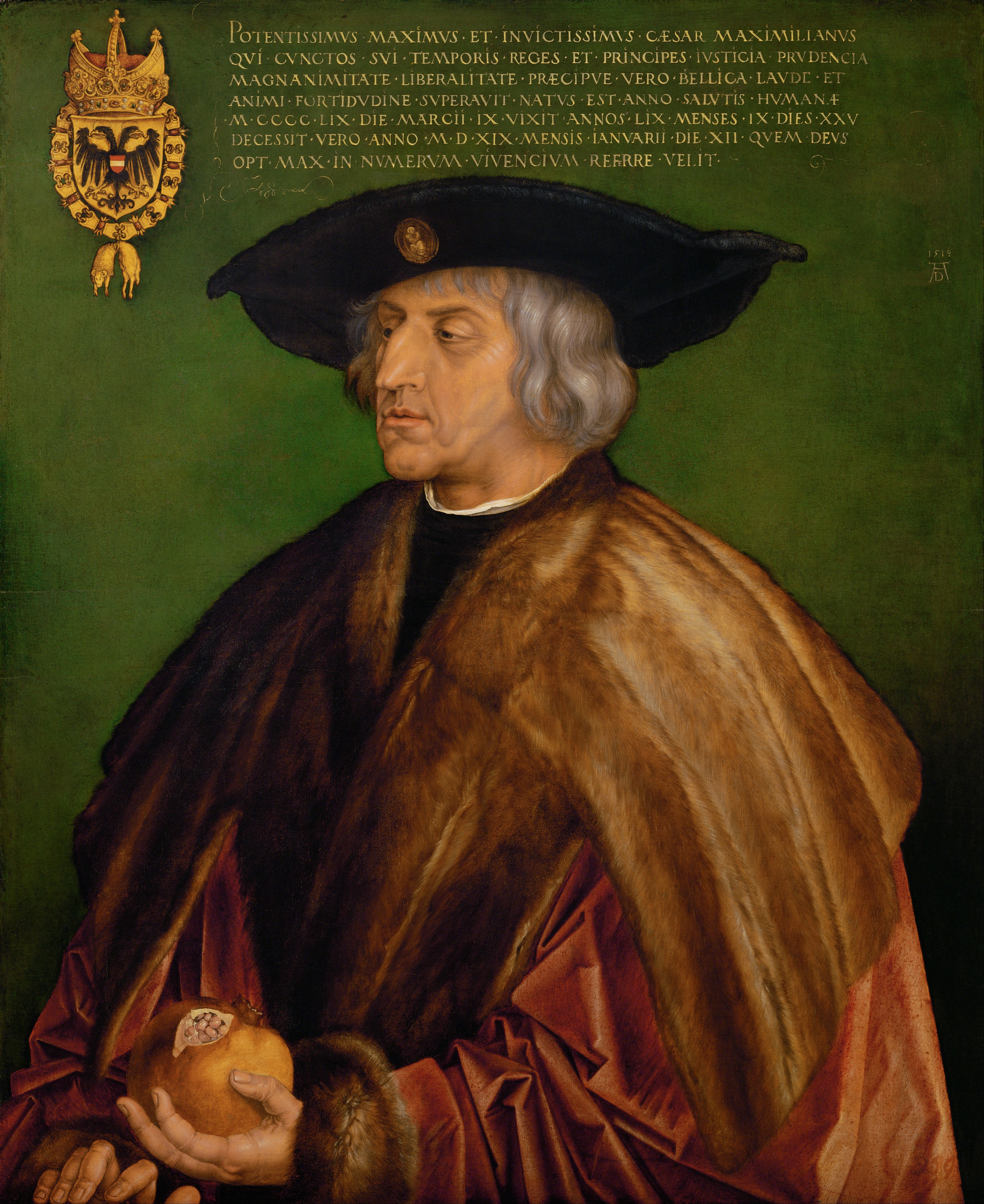
Maximilian I, Holy Roman Emperor. Painting by Albrecht Dürer

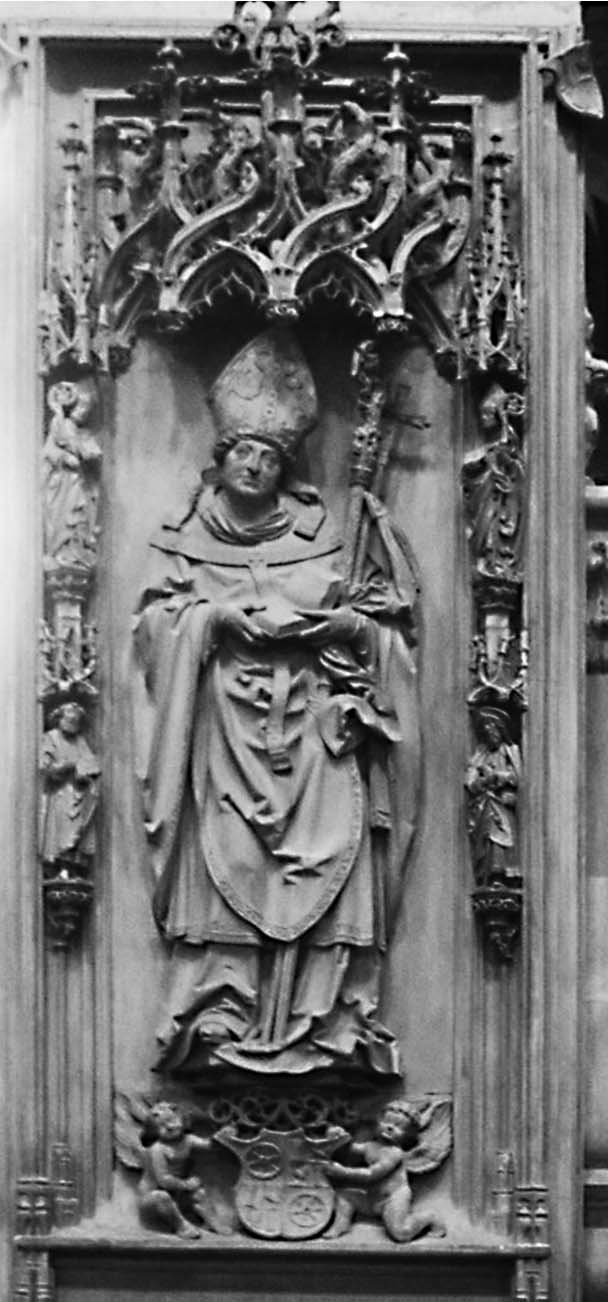
Berthold von Henneberg (died 1504), epitaph.

Two important initiators of the Reform

Imperial Reform (Latin: Reformatio imperii, German: Reichsreform) is the name given to repeated attempts in the 15th and 16th centuries to adapt the structure and the constitutional order (Verfassungsordnung) of the Holy Roman Empire to the requirements of the early modern state and to give it a unified government under either the Imperial Estates or the emperor's supremacy.

== First attempts ==
From 1434 to 1438, at imperial diets in Eger and Nuremberg, the first attempts at Imperial Reform were undertaken, partly on the initiative of Emperor Sigismund, partly by the prince-electors. Feuds were banned, and discussions were held on a revision of the rights of coinage and escort (Geleitrecht) and an administrative division of the Empire into imperial circles. All the proposals foundered, however, on the opposing interests of emperor and imperial princes.

Both parties were striving to create a more workable government of the empire, but they were working in opposite directions. The emperor was interested in strengthening his central control; the princes wanted collegiate, corporate leadership in which they could participate. The journals of the time, including publications like the Reformatio Sigismundi, show that the educated classes that represented the small territorial lordships of the counts and barons (Freiherren) as well as the imperial knights but also the imperial cities and the smaller ecclesiastical territories supported the emperor having a powerful position, because it offered better protection against the demands of their own lords. The emperor himself, however, who from the time of Sigismund's successor, Albert II, almost always came from the House of Habsburg, used imperial politics generally only if it served to support his own personal base of power at home.

== Reform measures from 1495 ==
In 1495, an attempt was made at an Imperial Diet in the city of Worms to give the disintegrating Holy Roman Empire a new structure, commonly referred to as Imperial Reform. The fundamental idea of the reform was largely based on the theory of political concordance between the emperor and the Imperial States, developed by Nicholas of Kues.

After the fall of the House of Hohenstaufen in the mid-13th century, the power of the emperors gradually declined in favour of the Estates of the Realm, especially of the prince-electors assigned by the Golden Bull of 1356. The autonomous estates had nevertheless become painfully aware of the disadvantages of the absence of a centralised authority on the occasions of threats and armed conflicts like the Hussite Wars.

Maximilian I of Austria was elected King of the Romans from 1486. At the 1495 Diet, Maximilian asked the representatives of the estates not only for contributions but also for an imperial tax to be raised and for troops to be committed for his wars against the Ottomans in the East and the French in Italy. The deputies, led by Chancellor Bertold von Henneberg-Römhild, the Archbishop of Mainz, agreed in principle to a Common Penny tax paid directly to the Empire, but in return set conditions:

1. The constitution of an Imperial Government, which placed power in the hand of the princes, with the emperor as an honorary chairman. Maximilian refused this restriction of his authority from outset, and did not consent until the Diet of Augsburg, 1500, after the states had conceded their own Landsknecht troops to him, only to abolish the Government two years later.
2. The Perpetual Public Peace established the Empire as a single body of law that excluded feuds as means of politics between the vassals.
3. Reception of Roman law: Roman law was adopted as the official law for the whole Empire
4. The related installation of the Reichskammergericht (Imperial Chamber Court), a supreme court for all of the Empire's territory. This Court originally had its seat at Frankfurt am Main; it moved to Speyer in 1523 and finally to Wetzlar in 1693

Maximilian generally opposed the institutions that weakened his power, but he supported the Land Peace, adoption of Roman law, sounder administrative procedures, better record-keeping, qualifications for offices, etc. Responding to the proposal that an Imperial Council (the later Reichsregiment) should be created, he agreed and welcomed the participation of the Estates, but he alone should be the one who appointed members, and the council should function only during his campaigns. He supported modernizing reforms (which he himself pioneered in his Austrian lands) but also wanted to tie them to his personal control, above all by permanent taxation, which the Estates consistently opposed. In 1504, when he was strong enough to propose his own ideas for such a Council, the cowered Estates tried to resist. At his strongest point, though, he still failed to find a solution for the common tax matter, which led to disasters in Italy later. Meanwhile, he explored Austria's potential as a base for Imperial power and built his government largely with officials drawn from the lower aristocracy and burghers in Southern Germany.

=== Reception of Roman Law ===
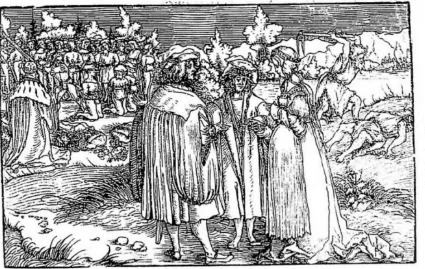
Maximilian I paying attention to an execution instead of watching the betrothal of his son Philip the Handsome and Joanna of Castile. The top right corner shows Cain and Abel. Satire against Maximilian's legal reform, associated with imperial tyranny. Created on behalf of the councilors of Augsburg. Plate 89 of Von der Arztney bayder Glück by the Petrarcameister.

At the 1495 Diet, the Reception of Roman Law was accelerated and formalized. The Roman law was made binding in German courts, except in the case it was contrary to local statutes. In practice, it became the basic law throughout Germany, displacing Germanic local law to a large extent, although Germanic law was still operative at the lower courts. Other than the desire to achieve legal unity and other factors, the adoption also highlighted the continuity between the ancient Roman Empire and the Holy Roman Empire. To realize his resolve to reform and unify the legal system, the emperor frequently intervened personally in matters of local law, overriding local charters and customs. This practice was often met with irony and scorn from local councils, who wanted to protect their local codes.

The legal reform seriously weakened the ancient Vehmic court (Vehmgericht), or Secret Tribunal of Westphalia, traditionally held to be instituted by Charlemagne but this theory is now considered unlikely.), although it would not be abolished completely until 1811 (when it was abolished under the order of Jérôme Bonaparte).

== Further development ==
In 1500 six (from 1512 on: ten) Imperial Circles were established with their own Circle Diets. The Circles, originally meant as constituencies of the Imperial Government, enabled a more uniform administration of the Empire to better execute the Perpetual Public Peace, taxation, and the raising of troops. The establishment of the Imperial Circles was a long-overdue response to the administrative impotence of the Empire at the local level regarding the questions of levies, implementation of justice, customs, beggars, poor people, and healthcare (implemented by medical police, or medizinische Policey, who took care of the drinking water supply and protection against epidemics). After some time, they also took responsibility for the construction of cross-border highways and roads, as well as many other matters in the early modern civilization process. Wolfgang Wüst opines that even if some aspects remained incomplete, the formation of the Imperial Circles proved to be an essential influence on the development of Early Modern Europe.

Maximilian responded to the Reichskammergericht by establishing the concurrent Aulic Council (Reichshofrat, lit. 'imperial court council') in 1497. Throughout the modern period, the Aulic Council remained by far the faster and more efficient among the two Courts. The Reichskammergericht on the other hand was often torn by matters related to confessional alliance. Around 1497–1498, as part of his administrative reforms, he restructured his Privy Council (Geheimer Rat), a decision which today induces much scholarly discussion. Apart from balancing the Reichskammergericht with the Reichshofrat, this act of restructuring seemed to suggest that, as Westphal quoting Ortlieb, the "imperial ruler – independent of the existence of a supreme court – remained the contact person for hard pressed subjects in legal disputes as well, so that a special agency to deal with these matters could appear sensible" (as also shown by the large number of supplications he received).

According to Thomas Brady Jr. and Jan-Dirk Müller, the most important governmental changes targeted the heart of the regime: the chancery. Early in Maximilian's reign, the Court Chancery at Innsbruck competed with the Imperial Chancery (which was under the elector-archbishop of Mainz, the senior Imperial chancellor). By referring the political matters in Tyrol, Austria as well as Imperial problems to the Court Chancery, Maximilian gradually centralized its authority. The two chanceries became combined in 1502. Jan-Dirk Müller opines that this chancery became the decisive government institution since 1502. In 1496, the emperor created a general treasury (Hofkammer) in Innsbruck, which became responsible for all the hereditary lands. The chamber of accounts (Raitkammer) at Vienna was made subordinate to this body. Under Paul von Liechtenstein, the Hofkammer was entrusted with not only hereditary lands' affairs, but Maximilian's affairs as the German king too.

Maximilian tried to direct the reform according to his monarchical-centralization agenda. Whaley notes that the real foundation of his Imperial power lay with his networks of allies and clients, especially the less powerful Estates, who helped him to recover his strength in 1502 – his first reform proposals as King of the Romans in 1486 were about the creation of a network of regional unions. According to Whaley, "More systematically than any predecessor, Maximilian exploited the potential of regional leagues and unions to extend imperial influence and to create the possibility of imperial government in the Reich." To the Empire, the mechanisms involving such regional institutions bolstered the Eternal Land Peace (Ewiger Landfriede) declared in 1495 as well as the creation of the Imperial Circles between 1500 and 1512, although they were only fully functional some decades later.

The Swiss Confederacy did not accept the resolutions of the Imperial Diet and explicitly refused to pay the Common Penny, one of the circumstances leading to the Swabian War of 1499 and the Confederacy's exemption from imperial legislation. Due to the obstinate resistance of several States, the collection of the tax was finally suspended in 1505.

The reform was more or less concluded with the Imperial Execution Order of 1555, part of the Peace of Augsburg, which regulated more details of the responsibilities of the Imperial Circle Estates.

== Emergence of a national political culture ==
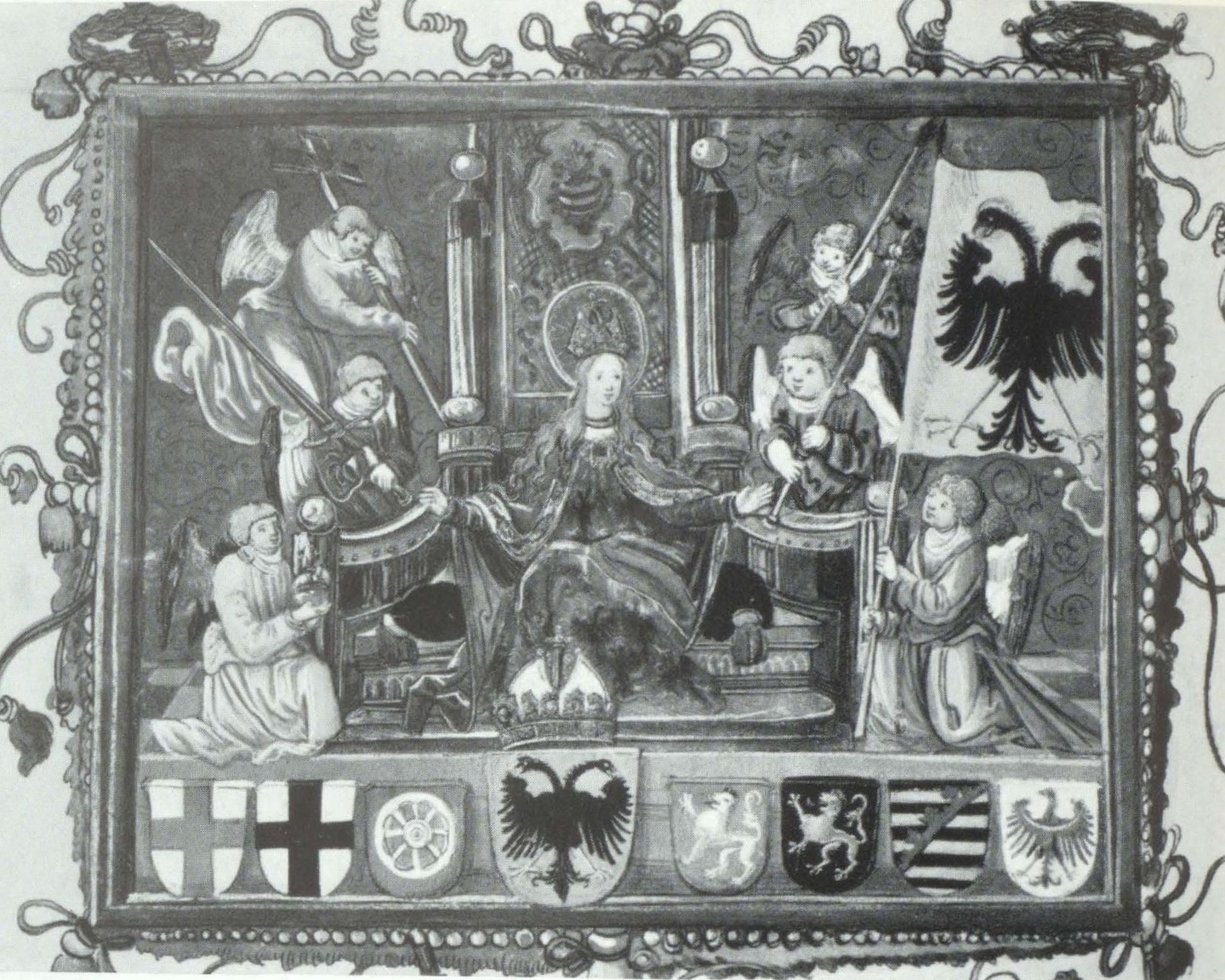
Personification of the Reich as Germania by Jörg Kölderer, 1512. The "German woman", wearing her hair loose and a crown, sitting on the Imperial throne, corresponds both to the self-image of Maximilian I as King of Germany and the formula Holy Roman Empire of the German Nation (omitting other nations). While usually depicted during the Middle Age as subordinate to both imperial power and Italia or Gallia, she now takes central stage in Maximilian's Triumphal Procession, being carried in front of Roma.

Maximilian and Charles V (despite the fact both emperors were internationalists personally) were the first who mobilized the rhetoric of the Nation, firmly identified with the Reich by the contemporary humanists. With encouragement from Maximilian and his humanists, iconic spiritual figures were reintroduced or became notable. The humanists rediscovered the work Germania, written by Tacitus. According to Peter H. Wilson, the female figure of Germania was reinvented by the emperor as the virtuous pacific Mother of Holy Roman Empire of the German Nation. Whaley further suggests that, despite the later religious divide, "patriotic motifs developed during Maximilian's reign, both by Maximilian himself and by the humanist writers who responded to him, formed the core of a national political culture."

Maximilian's reign also witnessed the gradual emergence of the German common language, with the notable roles of the imperial chancery and the chancery of the Wettin Elector Frederick the Wise. The development of the printing industry together with the emergence of the postal system (the first modern one in the world), initiated by Maximilian himself with contribution from Frederick III and Charles the Bold, led to a revolution in communication and allowed ideas to spread. Unlike the situation in more centralized countries, the decentralized nature of the Empire made censorship difficult.

Terence McIntosh comments that the expansionist, aggressive policy pursued by Maximilian I and Charles V at the inception of the early modern German nation (although not to further the aims specific to the German nation per se), relying on German manpower as well as utilizing fearsome Landsknechte and mercenaries, would affect the way neighbours viewed the German polity, although in the longue durée, Germany tended to be at peace.

== Evaluation ==
The Reform's purpose and its level of success have been interpreted differently depending on the period and the scholar.

Duncan Hardy notes that "The earliest historians to engage with this topic, who coined and popularized the notion of 'imperial reform' (Reichsreform), judged it as a well-intentioned partial failure. For Leopold von Ranke and Erich Molitor, imperial reform was a missed opportunity: an attempt to impose nation-statehood on the Empire from above, inspired by 'patriotic' reform-minded polemicists, which foundered on the particularistic ambitions of the monarchy and the princes, but nevertheless engendered substantial constitutional shifts." In his influential 1984 study of Reichsreform, Heinz Angermeier took a less top—down view, but also saw the reformist initiatives as "the product of a dialectic between the Empire's un-state-like constitution and the state-forming ambitions of its constituent authorities".

More recently, Georg Schmidt, also tying the matter of statehood to the Reform, argues that the Empire's early modern development was a kind of state formation, and that the reforms of 1495 "directed the Holy Roman Empire of the German Nation onto the path towards statehood". Another scholar whose approach is close to Schmidt's is Joachim Whaley with his 2012 work Germany and the Holy Roman Empire. Volume I: Maximilian I to the Peace of Westphalia 1493–1648. Robert von Friedeburg opines that Whaley brings out many compelling arguments but there are also certain problems: "Indeed, from the 1650s and then in particular the 1740s onwards, this reviewer finds that Whaley's attempt to downplay the problems of addressing the Empire as 'state' has an increasing price."

According to Barbara Stollberg-Rilinger, different sides in the Reform sought different goals and had different strategies. Maximilian sought to raise revenues to repulse the Ottomans in the East and the French in Italy and at the same time wanted to assert central authority and his ascension provided the direct incentive for the Reform. The Estates on the other hand wanted to make sure they had a voice in the government if they were to provide him with money. Berthold von Henneberg played a crucial role in coording the formulation of Reform laws in the Diet of 1491. Stollberg-Rilinger remarks that Henneberg's political platform was remarkably coherent. In the end though, the political frame and future-oriented structures that emerged after the Reform was not the product of a carefully laid out plan by any side, but the result of compromises on practical issues. Stollberg-Rilinger notes that "Maximilian I's rule set the stage for the structural evolution of the Empire in the following three hundred years." Stollberg also links the development of the Reform to the concentration of supranational power in the Habsburgs' hand, which manifested in the successful dynastic marriages of Maximilian and his descendants (and the successful defense of those lands, notably the rich Low Countries) as well as Maximilian's development of a revolutionary post system that helped the Habsburgs to maintain control of their territories.

Hardy notes that Peter Moraw joins Barbara Stollberg-Rilinger in presenting "the accelerated change and consolidation within the Empire around 1495/1500 as pragmatic responses to intensified consolidation and interconnection within the Empire, which were in turn the products of wider forces (greater military and fiscal demands and demographic growth, among others). While the reforms of this period ushered in a new 'constitutional' arrangement, in which power was formally divided between the monarchy and the estates, their long-term effects were unintended, and their implementation was presented as a restoration of (imagined) good old customs and order. The notion that structural change was founded upon a unified reform programme contained in fifteenth-century treatises and polemics has also been called into question."

Brady Jr. notes that during the reform process the Empire, now the Holy Roman Empire of the German Nation, gained most of its institutions that endured until its final demise in the nineteenth century. Thomas Brady Jr. opines that the Imperial Reform was successful, although perhaps at the expense of the reform of the Church, partly because Maximilian was not really serious about religious matters.

According to Brady Jr., the Empire, after the Imperial Reform, was a political body of remarkable longevity and stability, which "resembled in some respects the monarchical polities of Europe's western tier, and in others the loosely integrated, elective polities of East Central Europe." The new corporate German Nation, instead of simply obeying the emperor, negotiated with him.

Wilson tied the Reform to the territorial and power expansion of the Habsburgs: "The family's territorial expansion coincided with the high point of imperial reform around 1520, accelerating and transforming that process. The material power that made the dynasty the obvious choice as emperors, also threatened German liberties. The emperor assumed a Janus-faced position as the Empire's sovereign and its most powerful prince. The imperial Estates appreciated a strong emperor capable of repelling the Ottomans, and were prepared to relinquish some of their cherished liberties to institutions they believed would bind the Habsburgs to performing their imperial duties. The Habsburgs accepted greater constitutional checks on prerogatives as the price for a more potent infrastructure to mobilize the additional resources from the imperial Estates needed to meet their own ambitions and commitments." He calls the post-Reform Empire "a mixed monarchy in which the emperor shared power with an increasingly finely graduated hierarchy of princes, lords and cities collectively known as the imperial Estates". The institutions and structures developed by Imperial Reform mostly served German lands, while the Habsburg monarchy "remained closely entwined with the Empire", but deliberately refrained from including their other territories in its framework. "Instead, they developed their own institutions to manage what was, effectively, a parallel dynastic-territorial empire and which gave them an overwhelming superiority of resources, in turn allowing them to retain an almost unbroken grip on the imperial title over the next three centuries."

== See also ==
- Augsburg Interim
- Diet of Worms (1495)

== Sources ==
- Karl Zeumer: Quellensammlung zur Geschichte der deutschen Reichsverfassung in Mittelalter und Neuzeit. 2nd expanded edition. Mohr, Tübingen,1913. (Full text at Wikisource)
- Lorenz Weinrich (ed.): Quellen zur Reichsreform im Spätmittelalter = De reformando regni Teutonici statu in medioaevo posteriore fontes selectae. Wissenschaftliche Buchgesellschaft, Darmstadt, 2001, ISBN 3-534-06877-7 (Ausgewählte Quellen zur deutschen Geschichte des Mittelalters 39).
- Berenger, Jean; Simpson, C.A. (2014). A History of the Habsburg Empire 1273-1700. Routledge. pp. 120, 121. ISBN 9781317895701. Archived from the original on 5 October 2021.
- Brady, Thomas A. Jr. (2009). German Histories in the Age of Reformations, 1400–1650. Cambridge; New York: Cambridge University Press. ISBN 978-0-521-88909-4.
- Stollberg-Rilinger, Barbara (11 May 2021). The Holy Roman Empire: A Short History. Princeton University Press. pp. 46–53. ISBN 978-0-691-21731-4.
- Müller, Jan-Dirk (2003). Gosman, Martin; Alasdair, A.; MacDonald, A.; Macdonald, Alasdair James; Vanderjagt, Arie Johan (eds.). Princes and Princely Culture: 1450-1650. BRILL. p. 298. ISBN 9789004135727. Archived from the original on 24 October 2021.
