= Uriel von Gemmingen =

- Archbishop of Mainz
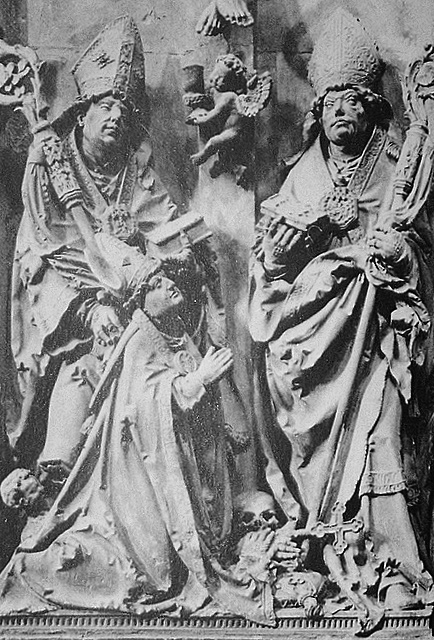
- Epitaph in the Mainzer cathedral. Inscription: Urieli de Gemmingen archiepiscopo Moguntino, principi electori, viro singulari vitae gravitate animique constantia praeclaro, qui posteaquam sedit annos IIII, menses IIII, dies XIII, aetatis suae anno XLV, a Christo nato MDXIIII V idus Februarii vitam cum pontificatu deponit.
- Church: Catholic Church
- Diocese: Electorate of Mainz
- In office: 1509–1514

Personal details
- Born: 1468
- Died: 9 February 1514 (aged 45–46)

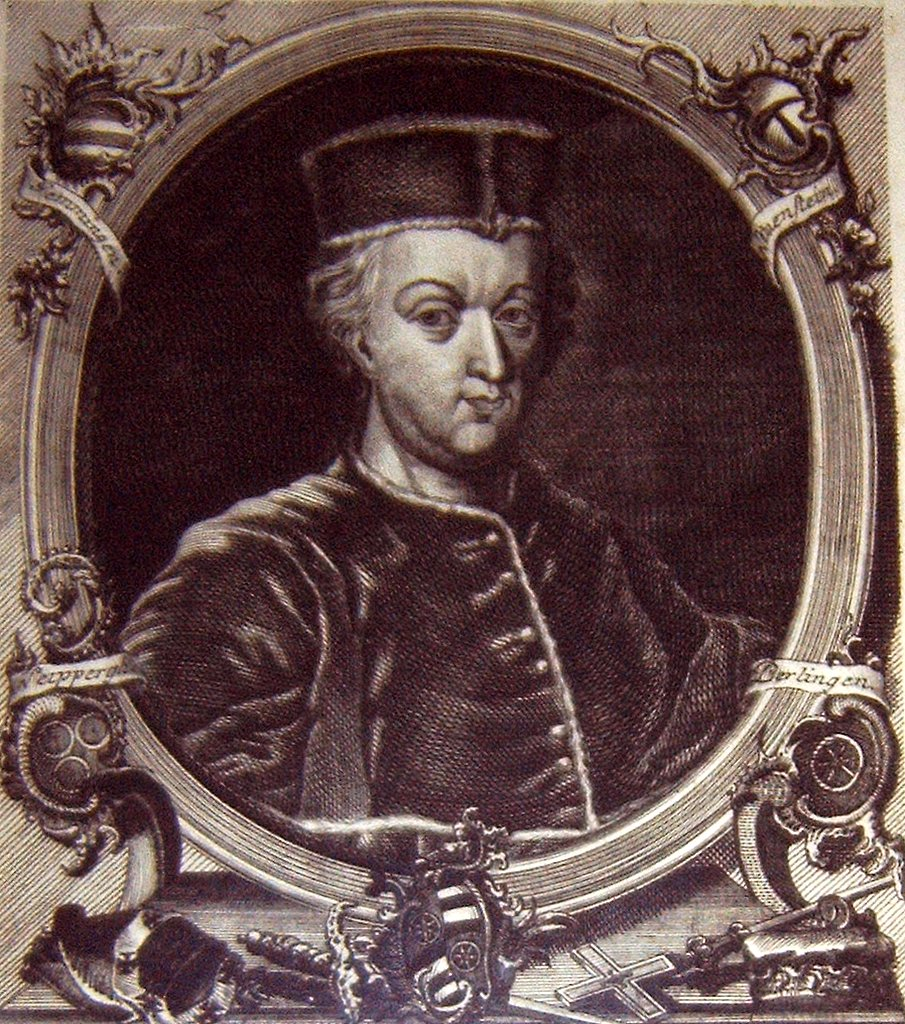
Uriel of Gemmingen, archbishop of Mainz and chancellor of the German Reich (woodcut)

Uriel von Gemmingen (1468 – 9 February 1514) was appointed Archbishop of Mainz on 27 September 1508, a prince elector, and chancellor to Emperor Maximillian I on 23 April 1509.

One of ten children of Hans von Gemmingen (1431–1487), on 10 November 1509, he was entangled in the Pfefferkorn controversy, after Johannes Pfefferkorn seized and desired to burn Jewish books. Gemmingen and Johannes Reuchlin did not see a danger to the Christian faith in the writings used by Jews. On 10 May 1513, Gemmingen appointed Beyfuss as rabbi over all Jews in the Mainz state. The argument over the book went beyond Uriel's death in 1514, not ultimately settled until 1520.

Uriel von Gemmingen is purported to have killed a cellar master in anger shortly before his own reputed death after catching the man stealing wine. Rumors suggested that he may have then faked his own death, and that the body buried in Mainz Cathedral was instead that of the cellar master, with Uriel afterwards fleeing to Italy where he died years later. However the tomb was reopened in 1724, where a corpse was found with the expected adornments of an archbishop; the matter is still considered unsettled.

Catholic Church titles
Preceded by Jacob of Liebenstein	Archbishop of Mainz; 1508 – 1514	Succeeded by Albert of Mainz
