= Imperial Diet (Holy Roman Empire) =

Deliberative body of the Holy Roman Empire

Imperial Diet Dieta Imperii (Latin) Reichstag (German)
- Deliberative body of the Holy Roman Empire

History
- Founded: 803
- Disbanded: 1806
- Succeeded by: Diet of the Confederation (Confederation of the Rhine)

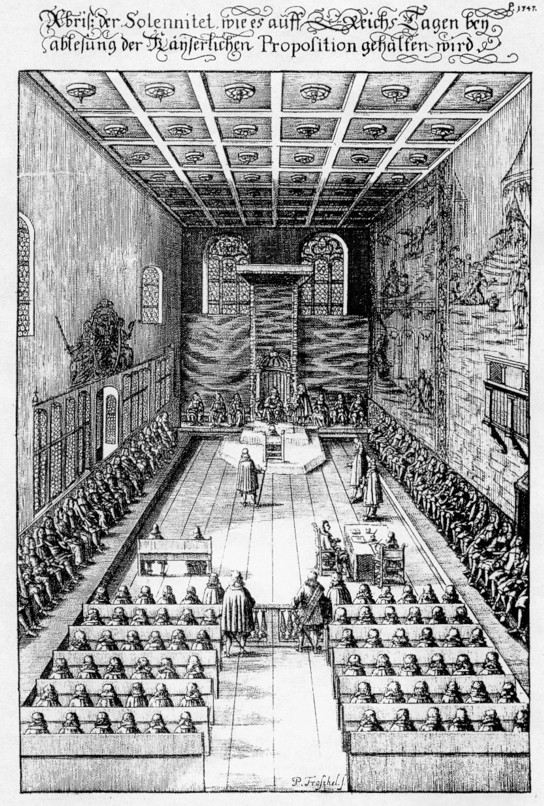
Seating plan for an inauguration of the Imperial Diet in the Regensburg Town Hall from a 1675 engraving: Emperor and prince-electors at the head, secular princes to the left, ecclesiastical to the right, deputies of imperial cities in the foreground.

The Imperial Diet (German: Reichstag; Latin: Dieta Imperii or Comitium Imperiale) was the deliberative body of the Holy Roman Empire. It was not a legislative body in the contemporary sense; its members envisioned it more like a central forum where it was more important to negotiate than to decide.

Its members were the Imperial Estates, divided into three colleges. The diet as a permanent, regularized institution evolved from the Hoftage (court assemblies) of the Middle Ages. From 1663 until the end of the empire in 1806, it was in permanent session at Regensburg.

All Imperial Estates enjoyed immediacy and, therefore, they had no authority above them besides the emperor himself. While all the estates were entitled to a seat and vote, only the higher temporal and spiritual princes of the College of Princes enjoyed an individual vote (Virilstimme), while lesser estates such as imperial counts and imperial abbots, were merely entitled to a collective vote (Kuriatstimme) within their particular bench (Curia), as did the free imperial cities belonging to the College of Towns.

The right to vote rested essentially on a territorial entitlement, with the result that when a given prince acquired new territories through inheritance or otherwise, he also acquired their voting rights in the diet. In general, members did not attend the permanent diet at Regensburg, but sent representatives instead. The late imperial diet was in effect a permanent meeting of ambassadors between the estates.

== History ==
The role and function of the Imperial Diet evolved over the centuries, like the Empire itself, with the estates and separate territories increasing control of their own affairs at the expense of imperial power. Initially, there was neither a fixed time nor location for the Diet. It began as a convention of the dukes of the old Germanic tribes that formed the Frankish kingdom when important decisions had to be made, probably based on the old Germanic law whereby each leader relied on the support of his leading men. In the early and high Middle Ages these assemblies were not yet institutionalized, but were held as needed at the decision of the king or emperor. They weren't called Diet yet, but Hoftag (court day). They were usually held in the imperial palaces (Kaiserpfalz).

For example, already under Charlemagne during the Saxon Wars, a Hoftag, according to the Royal Frankish Annals, met at Paderborn in 777 and determined laws over the subdued Saxons and other tribes. In 803 Charlemagne, by then crowned as emperor of the Franks, issued the final version of the Lex Saxonum.

At the Diet of 919 in Fritzlar the dukes elected the first King of the Germans, who was a Saxon, Henry the Fowler, thus overcoming the longstanding rivalry between Franks and Saxons and laying the foundation for the German realm. After the conquest of Italy, the 1158 Diet of Roncaglia finalized four laws that would significantly alter the (never formally written) constitution of the Empire, marking the beginning of the steady decline of the central power in favour of the local dukes. The Golden Bull of 1356 cemented the concept of "territorial rule" (Landesherrschaft), the largely independent rule of the dukes over their respective territories, and also limited the number of electors to seven. The Pope, contrary to modern myth, was never involved in the electoral process but only in the process of ratification and coronation of whomever the Prince-Electors chose.

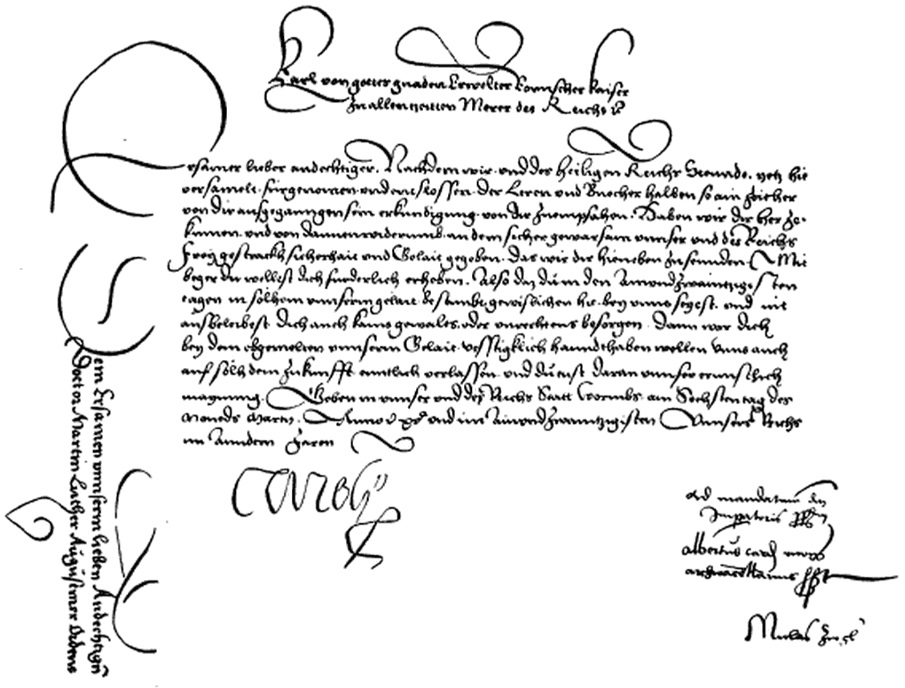
The summons for Luther to appear at the Diet of Worms, signed by Charles V. The text on the left was on the reverse side.

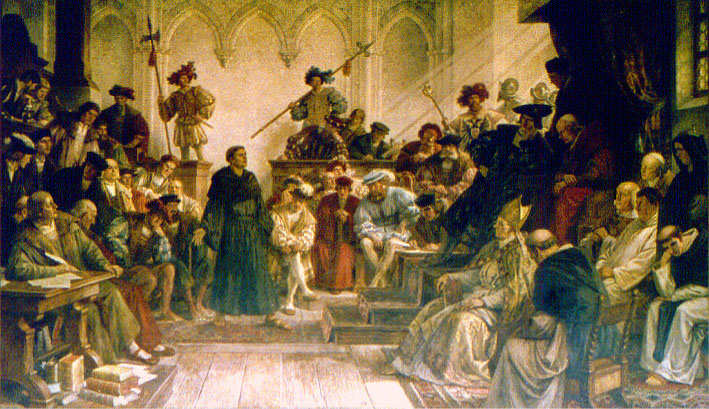
"Here I stand": Martin Luther at the Diet of Worms, 1521 (19th-century painting by Hermann Wislicenus)

Until the late 15th century the Diet was not formalized as an institution. Instead, the dukes and other princes would irregularly convene at the court of the emperor. These assemblies were usually referred to as Hoftage (from German Hof "court"). Only beginning in 1489 was the Diet called the Reichstag, and it was formally divided into collegia ("colleges").

Initially, the two colleges were of the prince-electors and of the remaining dukes and princes. Later, the imperial cities with Imperial immediacy became oligarchic republics independent of a local ruler, subject only to the emperor himself, and managed to be accepted as third parties. Motions passed if two of the colleges approved. Generally, the princely and electoral colleges would agree with each other, rather than rely on the cities to make a decision, but the cities still had influence.

Several attempts to reform the Empire and end its slow disintegration, starting with the Diet of Worms (1495), did not have much effect. In contrast, this process was hastened with the Peace of Westphalia of 1648, which formally bound the emperor to accept all decisions made by the Diet, in effect depriving him of his few remaining powers. Nonetheless, the emperor still had substantial influence in the Diet. The Habsburg emperors possessed a large number of votes, and even held command over the Imperial Army if the Diet decided to raise it.

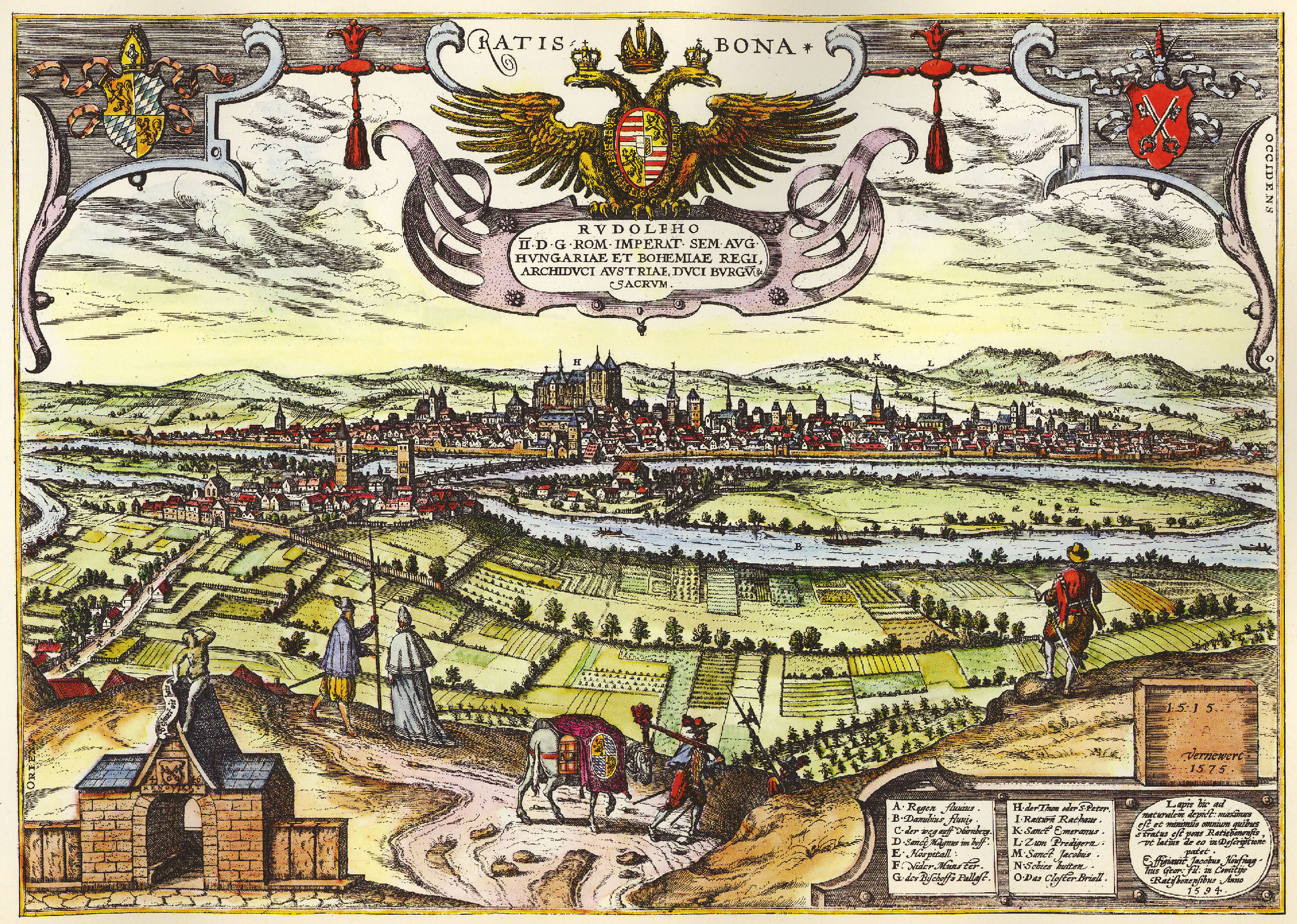
A view of Regensburg, c. 1600

Probably the most famous Diets were those held in Worms in 1495, where the Imperial Reform was enacted, and 1521, where Martin Luther was banned (see Edict of Worms), the Diets of Speyer 1526 and 1529 (see Protestation at Speyer), and several in Nuremberg (Diet of Nuremberg). Only with the introduction of the Perpetual Diet of Regensburg in 1663 did the Diet permanently convene at a fixed location.

The Imperial Diet of Constance opened on 27 April 1507; it recognized the unity of the Holy Roman Empire and founded the Imperial Chamber, the empire's supreme court.

== Participants ==
From 1489, the Diet comprised three colleges:

=== Electors ===
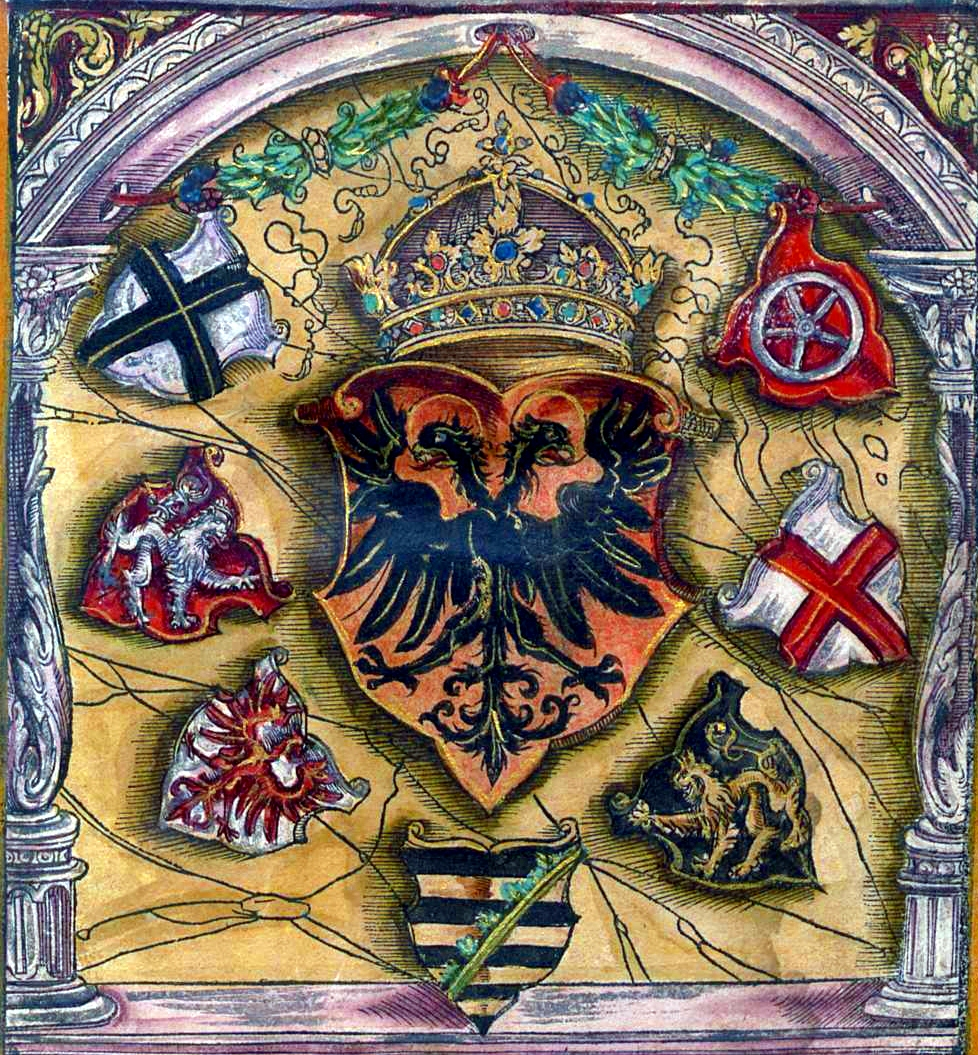
The coats of arms of prince electors surround the emperor's, from flags book of Jacob Köbel (1545).

The Electoral College (Kurfürstenrat) was led by the prince-archbishop of Mainz in his capacity as archchancellor of Germany. The seven prince-electors were designated by the Golden Bull of 1356:

- three ecclesiastical prince-bishops,
  - the prince-archbishop of Mainz as archchancellor of Germany
  - the prince-archbishop of Cologne as archchancellor of Italy
  - the prince-archbishop of Trier as archchancellor of Burgundy
- four secular princes,
  - the king of Bohemia as archcupbearer
  - the elector of the Palatinate as archsteward
  - the elector of Saxony as archmarshal
  - the margrave of Brandenburg as archchamberlain

The number increased to eight, when in 1623 the duke of Bavaria took over the electoral dignity of the count palatine, who himself received a separate vote in the electoral college according to the 1648 Peace of Westphalia (Causa Palatina), including the high office of an archtreasurer. In 1692 the elector of Hanover (formally Brunswick-Lüneburg) became the ninth prince-elector as archbannerbearer during the Nine Years' War.

In the War of the Bavarian Succession, the electoral dignities of the Palatinate and Bavaria were merged, approved by the 1779 Treaty of Teschen. The German Mediatisation of 1803 entailed the dissolution of the Cologne and Trier prince-archbishoprics. At the same time, the prince-archbishop of Mainz and German archchancellor received—as compensation for his lost territory occupied by Revolutionary France—the newly established Principality of Regensburg. In turn, four secular princes were elevated to prince-electors:

- the duke of Salzburg
- the duke of Württemberg
- the margrave of Baden
- the landgrave of Hesse-Kassel

These changes however had little effect, as with the abdication of Francis II the Empire was dissolved only three years later.

=== Princes ===
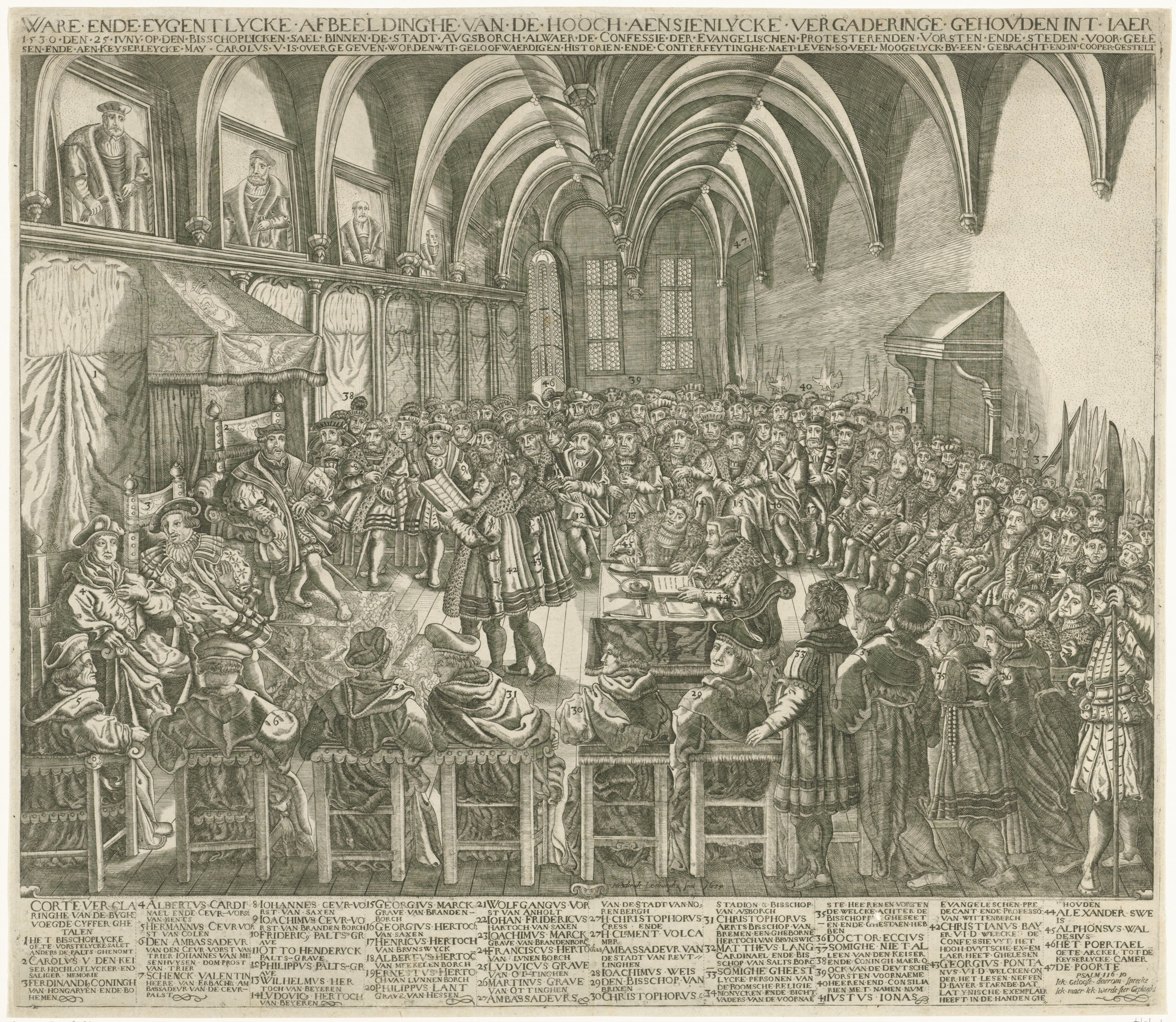
Charles V, Holy Roman Emperor receives the Augsburg Confession at the Diet of Augsburg on 25 June 1530

The college of Imperial princes (Reichsfürstenrat or Fürstenbank) incorporated the Imperial counts as well as immediate lords, prince-bishops and Imperial abbots. Strong in members, though often discordant, the second college tried to preserve its interests against the dominance of the Prince-electors.

The House of Princes was again subdivided into an ecclesiastical and a secular bench. Remarkably, the ecclesiastical bench was headed by the—secular—Archduke of Austria and the Burgundian duke of the Habsburg Netherlands (held by Habsburg Spain from 1556). As the Austrian House of Habsburg had failed to assume the leadership of the secular bench, they received the guidance over the ecclesiastical princes. The first ecclesiastical prince was the archbishop of Salzburg as Primas Germaniae; the prince-archbishop of Besançon, though officially a member until the 1678 Treaty of Nijmegen, did not attend the Diet's meetings.

The ecclesiastical bench also comprised the grand master and Deutschmeister of the Teutonic Knights, as well as the grand prior of the Monastic State of the Knights Hospitaller at Heitersheim. The prince-bishopric of Lübeck remained an ecclesiastical member even after it had turned Protestant, ruled by diocesan administrators from the House of Holstein-Gottorp from 1586. The Prince-Bishopric of Osnabrück, according to the 1648 Peace of Westphalia was under alternating rule of a Catholic bishop and a Lutheran bishop from the House of Hanover.

Each member of the Princes' College held either a single vote (Virilstimme) or a collective vote (Kuriatstimme). Due to the Princes, their single vote from 1582 strictly depended on their immediate fiefs; this principle led to an accumulation of votes, when one ruler held several territories in personal union. Counts and lords only were entitled to collective votes, they therefore formed separate colleges like the Wetterau Association of Imperial Counts and mergers within the Swabian, the Franconian and the Lower Rhenish–Westphalian Circles. Likewise, on the ecclesiastical bench, the Imperial abbots joined a Swabian or Rhenish college.

In the German Mediatisation of 1803, numerous ecclesiastical territories were annexed by secular estates. However, a reform of the Princes' college was not carried out until the Empire's dissolution in 1806.

=== Cities ===
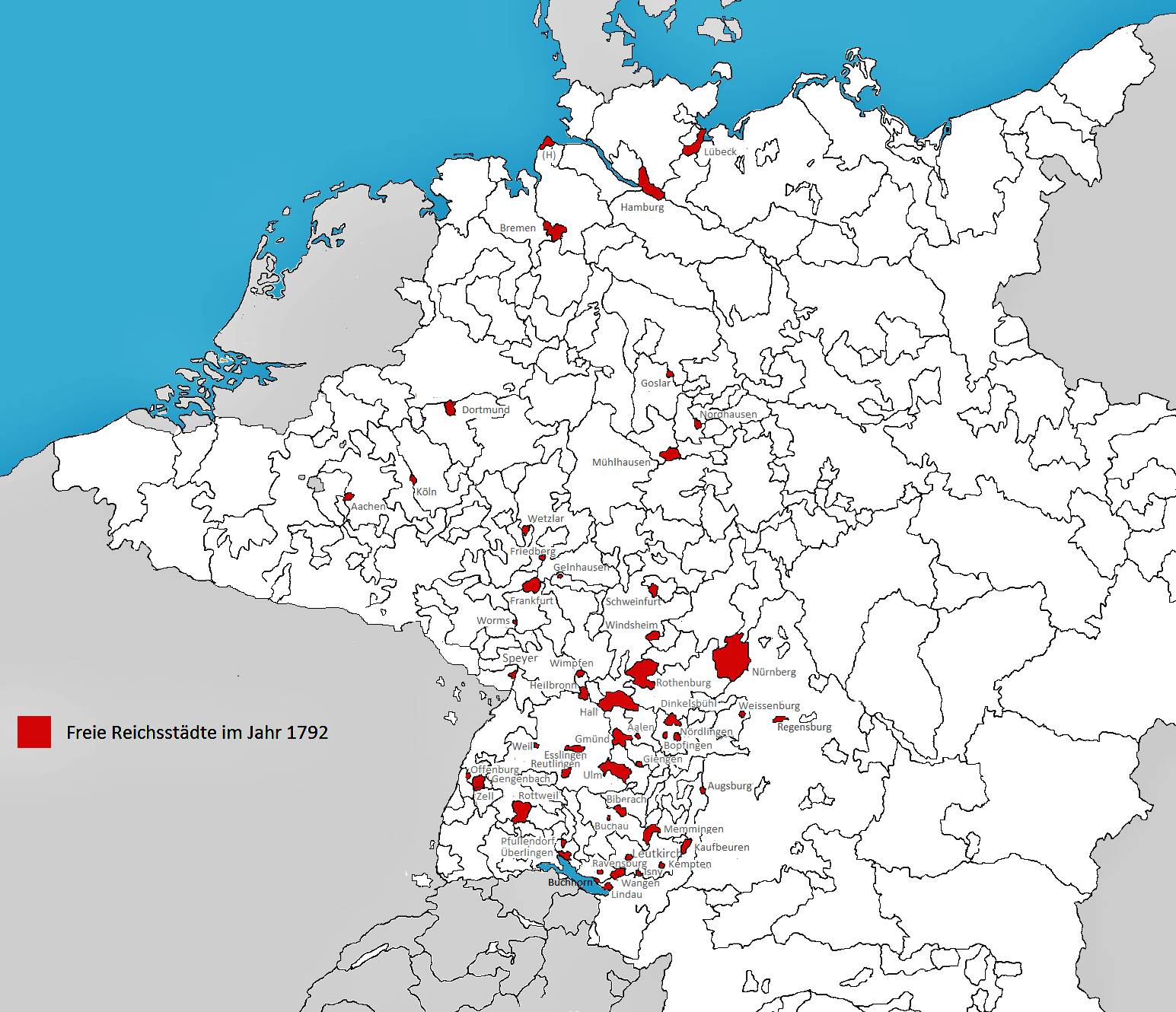
The free imperial cities in the 18th century

The college of Imperial Cities (Reichsstädtekollegium) evolved from 1489 onwards. It contributed greatly to the development of the Imperial Diets as a political institution. Nevertheless, the collective vote of the cities was of inferior importance until a 1582 Recess of the Augsburg Diet. The college was led by the city council of the actual venue until the Perpetual Diet in 1663, when the chair passed to Regensburg.

The Imperial cities also divided into a Swabian and Rhenish bench. The Swabian cities were led by Nuremberg, Augsburg and Regensburg, the Rhenish cities by Cologne, Aachen and Frankfurt.

For a complete list of members of the Imperial Diet from 1792, near the end of the Empire, see List of Reichstag participants (1792).

== Religious bodies ==
After the Peace of Westphalia, religious matters could no longer be decided by a majority vote of the colleges. Instead, the Reichstag would separate into Catholic and Protestant bodies, which would discuss the matter separately and then negotiate an agreement with each other, a procedure called the itio in partes. The Catholic body, or corpus catholicorum, was headed by the Archbishop-Elector of Mainz.

The Protestant body, or corpus evangelicorum, was headed by the Elector of Saxony. At meetings of the Protestant body, Saxony would introduce each topic of discussion, after which Brandenburg-Prussia and Hanover would speak, followed by the remaining states in order of size. When all the states had spoken, Saxony would weigh the votes and announce a consensus.

Frederick Augustus I, Elector of Saxony converted to Catholicism in 1697 in order to become King of Poland, but the Electorate itself remained officially Protestant and retained the directorship of the Protestant body. When the Elector's son also converted to Catholicism, Prussia and Hanover attempted to take over the directorship in 1717–1720, but without success. The Electors of Saxony would head the Protestant body until the end of the Holy Roman Empire.

== Collection of records ==
After the formation of the new German Empire in 1871, the Historical Commission of the Bavarian Academy of Sciences started to collect imperial records (Reichsakten) and imperial diet records (Reichstagsakten). In 1893 the commission published the first volume. At present the years 1524–1527 and years up to 1544 are being collected and researched. A volume dealing with the 1532 Diet of Regensburg, including the peace negotiations with the Protestants in Schweinfurt and Nuremberg and the question of aid against Ottoman forces, by Rosemarie Aulinger of Vienna was published in 1992.

== Locations ==
Year	Place	President	Theme
754	Quierzy-sur-Oise	Pepin the Short	Donation of Pepin to Pope Stephen II
777	Paderborn	Charlemagne	First Diet on Saxon soil, Duke Widukind refused to appear
782	Lippspringe	Charlemagne	Division of Saxony into Gaue under Frankish Grafen (counts)
788	Ingelheim am Rhein	Charlemagne	Deposition of Duke Tassilo III of Bavaria
799	Paderborn	Charlemagne	Charlemagne clears with Pope Leo III his installation as Emperor
806	Diedenhofen	Charlemagne	Division of the Carolingian Empire among Pepin of Italy, Charles the Younger and Louis the Pious
817	Aachen		
826	Unknown		Invitation of the Sorbs
829	Worms		
831	Aachen		
835	Diedenhofen	Louis the Pious	
838	Speyer	Louis the Pious	
872	Forchheim	Louis the German	
874	Forchheim	Louis the German	Discussion and regulation of inheritance
887	Tribur		
889	Forchheim	Arnulf of Carinthia	
892	Forchheim	Arnulf of Carinthia	Preparing a War against the Slavs
896	Forchheim	Arnulf of Carinthia	
903	Forchheim	Louis the Child	Execution of the Babenberg Rebel Adalhard
907	Forchheim	Louis the Child	Council about the Magyar attacks
911	Forchheim		Election of Conrad of Franconia King
914	Forchheim	Conrad of Franconia	War against Arnulf I of Bavaria
919	Fritzlar		
926	Worms	Henry the Fowler	
952	on the Lech meadows near Augsburg	Otto I	
961	Forchheim	Otto I	
967	Ravenna	Otto II	
972	Quedlinburg		Otto I celebrated his son and Theophanu Byzantine princess' marriage and a plenty of foreigners came to celebrate with them. Hungarian envoys came to request mission priests.
976	Regensburg		
978	Dortmund	Otto II	War against France in the Autumn
983	Verona		Election of Otto III
985	Unknown		End of the usurpation of Henry the Wrangler
993	Dortmund	Otto III	
1018	Nijmegen	Henry II	Preparing the Battle of Vlaardingen
1030	Minden	Conrad II	
1066	Tribur		
1076	Worms	Henry IV	
1077	Augsburg		
1098	Mainz	Henry IV	
1105	Ingelheim	Henry IV	
1119	Tribur	Henry IV	
1122	Worms	Henry V	
1126	Speyer	Henry V	
1146	Speyer	Conrad III	Decision to participate in the Second Crusade
1147	Frankfurt	Conrad III	
1152	Dortmund, Merseburg	Frederick I Barbarossa	
1154	Goslar		
1157	Bisanz	Frederick I Barbarossa	
1158	Diet of Roncaglia near Piacenza	Frederick I Barbarossa	
1165	Würzburg	Frederick I Barbarossa	
1168	Bamberg	Frederick I Barbarossa, Henry VI	
1178	Speyer	Frederick I Barbarossa	
1180	Gelnhausen	Frederick I Barbarossa, Henry VI	Investiture of the Archbishop of Cologne with the Duchy of Westphalia
1181	Erfurt	Henry VI	Exile of Henry the Lion
1188	Mainz	Henry VI	
1190	Schwäbisch Hall	Henry VI	Abolishment of the Duchy of Lower Lorraine
1193	Speyer	Henry VI	Trial of Richard I
1196	Frankfurt	Henry VI	
1205	Speyer	Philip of Swabia	
1213	Speyer	Frederick II	Frederick has his uncle, Philip of Swabia, who was murdered 1208 in Bamberg, interred in the Speyer cathedral
1235	Mainz	Frederick II	
1273	Speyer	Rudolf I	
1287	Würzburg	Adolf	
1309	Speyer	Henry VII	
1338	Frankfurt		
1356	Nuremberg	Charles IV	Issuance of the Golden Bull
1379	Frankfurt		
1384	Speyer		
1389	Eger	Wenceslaus	Peace of Eger
1414	Speyer	Sigismund	
1444	Speyer	Frederick III	
1487	Speyer	Frederick III	
1487	Nuremberg	Frederick III	
1488	Esslingen	Frederick III	Formation of the Swabian League
1495	Worms	Maximilian I	Imperial Reform; Common Penny in the wake of the Swabian War
1496/97	Lindau		
1497/98	Freiburg		
1500	Augsburg		
1505	Cologne		Arbitration ending the War of the Succession of Landshut
1507	Konstanz		
1512	Trier, Cologne		10 Imperial Circles
1518	Augsburg		
1521	Worms	Charles V	Diet of Worms, ban of Martin Luther, Edict of Worms
1522	Nuremberg I		
1522/23	Nuremberg II		
1524	Nuremberg III		
1526	Speyer I		Diet of Speyer, suspension of the Edict of Worms
1529	Speyer II		Diet of Speyer, reinstatement of the Edict of Worms, Protestation at Speyer. Proclamation of the Wiedertäufermandat condemning Anabaptists
1530	Augsburg		Diet of Augsburg presentation of the Augsburg Confession
1532	Regensburg		Constitutio Criminalis Carolina
1541	Regensburg		
1542	Speyer		
1542	Nuremberg		
1543	Nuremberg		
1544	Speyer		
1548	Augsburg		Augsburg Interim
1550/51	Augsburg		
1555	Augsburg		Peace of Augsburg
1556/57	Regensburg	Ferdinand I	
1559	Augsburg		
1566	Augsburg		
1567	Regensburg		
1570	Speyer		The infantry of the Empire gained a comprehensive military code
1576	Regensburg		
1582	Augsburg		
1594	Regensburg		
1597/98	Regensburg		
1603	Regensburg		
1608	Regensburg		
1613	Regensburg		
1640–41	Regensburg		
1653–54	Regensburg	Ferdinand III	The Youngest Recess (Jüngster Reichsabschied, recessus imperii novissimus)
1663–1806	In the Reichssaal of the Regensburg town hall as the Perpetual Diet	See list	

== See also ==
- Imperial Diet (disambiguation)

== Bibliography ==
- Peter Claus Hartmann: Das Heilige Römische Reich deutscher Nation in der Neuzeit 1486–1806. Stuttgart 2005, ISBN 3-15-017045-1.
- Axel Gotthard: Das Alte Reich 1495–1806. Darmstadt 2003, ISBN 3-534-15118-6
- Edgar Liebmann: Reichstag. In: Friedrich Jaeger (Hrsg.): Enzyklopädie der Neuzeit, Bd. 10: Physiologie-Religiöses Epos. Stuttgart 2009, str. 948–953, ISBN 3-534-17605-7
- Barbara Stollberg-Rilinger: Des Kaisers alte Kleider. Verfassungsgeschichte und Symbolsprache des Alten Reiches. München 2008, ISBN 978-3-406-57074-2
- Helmut Neuhaus: Das Reich in der frühen Neuzeit (Enzyklopädie Deutscher Geschichte, Band 42). München 2003, ISBN 3-486-56729-2.
- Heinz Angermeier: Das alte Reich in der deutschen Geschichte. Studien über Kontinuitäten und Zäsuren. München 1998, ISBN 3-486-55897-8
