= Diet of Worms (1495) =

Imperial Diet in 1495

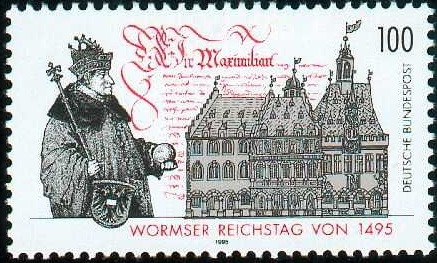
Diet of Worms, 1495 (1995 German postage stamp)

At the Diet of Worms (German: Reichstag zu Worms) in 1495, the foundation stone was laid for a comprehensive reform (Reichsreform) of the Holy Roman Empire. Even though several elements of the reforms agreed by the Imperial Diet (Reichstag) at Worms did not last, they were nevertheless highly significant in the further development of the empire. They were intended to alter its structure and constitutional ordinances in order to resolve the problems of imperial government that had become evident.

== Background ==
During the 15th century, it became increasingly clear that the Holy Roman Empire needed an imperial reform. Opinions varied, ranging from the restoration of the absolute imperial power to an Imperial Government (Reichsregiment) of the electors. One of many proposals, for example, was the Reformatio Sigismundi. Almost all the reform proposals advocated an Eternal Peace (Ewiger Landfriede), as well as legal, judicial, tax and coinage regulations.

From the Frankfurt Election Day (1486) onwards, the Imperial Estates (Reichsstände) tried to make their support conditional on the emperor granting concessions over the Imperial Reform. Emperor Frederick III repeatedly rejected this in favour of the 10-year peace (1486) ordinance, however. Maximilian I, the Roman-German King and later Emperor, extended the peace on 10 May 1494 to 1499, which was seen as a signal of his willingness to reform.

== Diet of Worms ==
When Maximilian I, Holy Roman Emperor announced on 24 November 1494 that the Diet of Worms would take place on 2 February 1495, his focus was not imperial reform, but various foreign policy issues. Maximilian saw the war against the Ottoman Empire as his most important duty. In addition, Charles VIII of France had begun an Italian campaign in 1494, which threatened Pope Alexander VI, Imperial Italy and especially Milan, with whom Maximilian was connected by marriage. As a consequence the Turkish War became secondary, and Maximilian planned a campaign in Italy in 1495, which he wanted to be linked to his coronation in Rome. For these reasons, he set aside just two weeks for the Diet, hoping that the Imperial Estates (who appeared to be lining up with his ideas) would then set off on the march to Rome.

After several delays, Maximilian reached Worms on 18 March. Contrary to his optimistic intentions, the king did not leave Worms until September, because the Imperial Estates did not want to embark on a campaign, but were interested in the reform of the empire. The course of the Diet can be roughly divided into three phases.

=== 26 March to 27 April ===
After the emperor had opened the Diet, he pointed out to the Estates the dangers in Italy. He urged them to provide "urgent assistance" (so-called eilende Hilfe) against the French, which he saw as support from the Holy League of 1495 that he had backed. The Estates initially rejected this, even taking account of the nobles and ambassadors who had still not arrived. Instead, they proposed discussions about the reform of the empire. Since the king clearly wanted to press on to Italy, the Estates attempted to take advantage of his predicament for themselves in order to clarify the question of reform. Negotiations with the Estates did not officially start until 7 April; because the Estates wanted first to discuss their desire for reform amongst themselves without the presence of the king.

Meanwhile, the news from Italy deteriorated. The French had conquered the Kingdom of Naples, and there was alarm that they would conquer the whole of Italy. In a renewed request to the Estates for help on 24 April, the king reported that papacy and imperial crown threatened to fall into the hands of Charles VIII, and that 4,000 men had had to be urgently dispatched to Italy. The Estates, however, wanted nothing to do with any financial support to the king without a quid pro quo in the shape of reforms.

=== 27 April to 22 June ===
On 27 April, Maximilian appeared at the Imperial Assembly (Reichsversammlung) and announced that he was prepared initially to hold discussions about an Imperial Government (Reichsregiment), an Eternal Peace (Ewiger Landfriede) and an Imperial Court (Reichskammergericht), after which the questions of external assistance and imperial taxes were to be addressed. Subsequently, Maximilian asked several times for assistance in Italy, attempting to stir up fear of a strong France. Despite the dreadful news from Italy and reports by ambassadors of Holy League members, Maximilian could not persuade the Estates.

The tone of the negotiations that followed intensified, and the king spoke bitterly of extortion. Smaller and larger concessions kept the negotiations going. On 1 June, the king was promised 100,000 guilders of emergency aid and they agreed in broad terms about the public peace, the chamber court and imperial taxes. The main point of dispute now was the Imperial Government, a subject with which Maximilian would not engage.

=== 22 June to 7 August ===
As the Estates continued to resist the issue of support in Italy, Maximilian presented them with a counter-proposal on 22 June. Thus, although he offered an alternative to the reform plans of the Estates, which were not acceptable to him, at the same time he showed that he was finally entering into the internal political debate and had set his plans for Italy to one side. At the end of June, Charles VIII withdrew again from Italy, thus easing the external pressure on Maximilian. Now he could concentrate on the negotiations which were nearing an end. Presumably under the influence of the Elector of Mainz, Berthold of Henneberg, the Archchancellor and spokesman of the Estates, by 28 June, the proposal for an Imperial Government was withdrawn by the electors and princes and the promised 100,000 guilders was granted. As a result, the key negotiations were saved and compromises were agreed in the following weeks on the other negotiating points or they were postponed to the next Imperial Diet. During July, the final texts of the reform laws were drafted and the closing festivities begun. After 26 July, the final versions of the Eternal Peace, the Imperial Court, the handling of peace and war and the Common Penny were presented to the king. Last-minute corrections were made before, on 7 August, the official documents were published.

== Participants and the negotiations ==
First, it must be clearly understood that the German term for diet, Reichstag, had not yet been established at this time. Although, in hindsight, one can speak about Reichstage from about the 1470s, in contemporary parlance these meetings were still referred to as Hoftage. Not until the decisions passed by this Reichstag did the term become common.

=== Participating estates and their positions ===
If it is also assumed that it was Reichsversammlung (national assembly), it had been a long time since all the nobles and forces of the empire came together. Of the seven prince electors only five were in attendance; Bohemia and Brandenburg did not appear. In addition ten ecclesial and twenty nine secular princes were present in person, twelve ecclesial and secular princes had sent diplomatic representatives. In addition, sixty seven counts and free knights were present, as well as twenty four imperial cities. Thus, a total of 147 imperial estates were present, which accounted for nearly half of the total.

The Diet of Worms was not an event in which there were clear battle lines between the king and the estates. Instead, the main problem, and the reason for the lengthy negotiations, was a lack of unity among the estates. At the Reichstag, the imperial estates were divided into in three curiae (see also: Landtag (historical)). In each of these curiae all the different interests had to reach a consensus, then the interests of the three curiae had to be coordinated, and only then could they negotiate with the king. If a change was made during the negotiations, the curiae had to be informed. Some of the estates were very interested in the reform of the Empire. Others were, for various reasons, against the reform proposals, because they had to waive their privileges, or they did not feel their interests were sufficiently represented or they saw a conflict of loyalties. With regard to the reforms, there was therefore no united front or "kingdom against King".

=== Role of Berthold of Henneberg ===
Berthold of Henneberg, the Prince Elector of Mainz, Archchancellor and spokesman for the Imperial Estates was a central figure at the diet. He arrived together with the king, who had confirmed and strengthened Berthold's position as archchancellor in 1494. During the negotiations he had the role of intermediary between the Estates and tried several times, when the diet threatened to collapse, to mediate and to make concessions to the king. At the same time he was one of the strongest proponents of imperial reforms. Because he campaigned strongly for the Imperial Government (Reichsregiment), Maximilian soon became suspicious that he wanted to use this route to set himself up as the ruler of the empire himself. What motivation Berthold of Henneberg had for his policies, is not clear, but he was known as a shrewd and influential politician, who advocated the reform of the empire throughout his life.

=== Imperial Government ===
The Imperial Government was the main plank of the reform plans put forward by the Estates and Berthold of Henneberg and, at the same time, the most difficult and contentious issue. The plans of the Estates would have meant a voluntary disempowerment of the king and empire, entailing a transfer of imperial power to a council. However, this was a proposal that by no means would have produced a modern or democratic government, rather it envisaged the replacement of the monarchy by an oligarchy of electors. This had quickly become clear to the Estates, which is why the Imperial Government was the toughest and most controversial part of the reform plans, and not just for the king. Maximilian put forward a counter-proposal that would have made the Imperial Government an advisory body like the Hofrat and a sort of representative body in the absence of the king. Since this was also not in the interest of reform-minded nobles, the Diet was only able to achieve success when plans for an imperial government were completely abandoned.

== Reforms of Worms ==
The Eternal Peace (a ban on feuding), the Imperial Chamber Court and the Common Penny were the outstanding and defining results of the Diet of Worms in 1495. Due to their novelty at that time they were not able to be implemented immediately (or even at all), but at least the Eternal Peace and the Imperial Court laid the foundations of the present constitutional state.

Considerably more important, however, were the less tangible results of the Diet of 1495. It heavily influenced the Diet both as a concept and an institution. For the first time, the nobles had gathered to make policy. Institutionalization and rule of law had been pursued, encouraging the development of the nation-state. Above all the king accepted the institution of the Diet as a powerful political tool.

== Further developments and consequences ==
The Old Swiss Confederacy rejected the Imperial Tax and Imperial Chamber Court. This was one of the reasons that led to the Swabian War in 1499. After the Confederacy's victory it was implicitly recognised at the Treaty of Basel that the Confederacy was exempted from the Imperial Tax and Imperial Chamber Court, without, however, having to leave the Empire.

The Imperial Government promised in Worms was not actually called into existence until the Diet of Augsburg in 1500, but was dissolved again as early as 1502. A second attempt at reform, which was undertaken in Worms at the diet of 1521, also failed.

On 21 July 1495 the County of Württemberg was elevated at the diet to a duchy under Eberhard (V) I.

In 1518–1519 Luther had better understanding as increased of oppositions. The increasing gap between the Luther and papacy on key questions regarding the Christian faith eventually culminated in a distinctive fracture when in late 1518–1519 Luther came to his better realization of Gospel.

== Literature ==
- Manfred Hollegger: Maximilian I.: (1459–1519); Herrscher und Mensch einer Zeitenwende. Kohlhammer, Stuttgart, 2005.
- Hermann Wiesflecker: Kaiser Maximilian I. Das Reich, Österreich und Europa an der Wende zu Neuzeit. Band II: Reichsreform und Kaiserpolitik 1493-1500. Oldenbourg, Munich, 1975
- Heinz Angermeier: Die Reichsreform 1410–1555: die Staatsproblematik in Deutschland zwischen Mittelalter und Gegenwart. Beck, Munich, 1984
- Paul-Joachim Heinig: Der Wormser Reichstag von 1495 als Hoftag. In: Zeitschrift für Historische Forschung, Vol. 33 (2006) pp. 338–357.
- Claudia Helm (ed.): 1495 - Kaiser, Reich, Reformen: der Reichstag zu Worms. Landesarchivverwaltung Rheinland-Pfalz, Koblenz, 1995
- Georg Schmidt-von Rhein (ed.): Kaiser Maximilian I.: Bewahrer und Reformer. Ramstein, Paqué, 2002
- Markus Thiel: Der Reichstag zu Worms im Jahre 1495 und die Schaffung des Reichskammergerichts. Kompromiß eines kriegsbedrängten Kaisers oder friedensbedingte Rechtssetzung? In: Der Staat. Zeitschrift für Staatslehre und Verfassungsgeschichte, deutsches und europäisches Öffentliches Recht, 41st vol., 2002, pp. 551–573.
