= Reformatio Sigismundi =

1439 document from the Council of Basle

The Reformatio Sigismundi was a document that appeared in 1439 in connection with efforts to reform the Holy Roman Empire during the reign of Emperor Sigismund (r. 1410–1437). It was produced at the Council of Basel–Florence, published by an anonymous author, and referred to the injustice of the German rulers.

The Reformatio was published in German and probably as a result became the most widely circulated reform paper of its time. The text was first printed in 1476 and there were seven new editions by 1522. In part it was even treated in the 15th century as an imperial law. The Reformatio stands at the beginning of a trend to no longer publish constitutional and political principles solely in Latin, but also in German.

In terms of content the Reformatio differed little from other political reform texts of Sigismund's reign. It presented proposals for the reform of Church and Empire, some of which were practical, others were unrealistic. The text contained a teaching of the sacraments and argued in favour of the marriage of priests and the secularization of church property. In addition it included a vision of Emperor Sigismund's about the appearance of a priest-king Frederick and plans for a wide reform of the monarchy (and emperorship) and the (German) empire.

== Literature ==
- State documents of the Late Middle Ages 6: Reformation Kaiser Siegmunds. Published by Heinrich Koller. Stuttgart, 1964 (Monumenta Germaniae Historica, digitalised)
- Hartmut Boockmann: Zu den Wirkungen der „Reform Kaiser Siegmunds", in: Deutsches Archiv für Erforschung des Mittelalters. 1979, pp. 514 – 541
- Lothar Graf zu Dohna: Reformatio Sigismundi, Göttingen, 1960
- Malte Prietzel: Das Heilige Römische Reich im Spätmittelalter (= Geschichte kompakt. Mittelalter), Darmstadt, 2004, pp. 116f.
- H. Koller: Reformatio Sigismundi, in: Lexikon des Mittelalters, Vol.7, pp. 550f.
