= Protestant League =

Protestant League may refer to:

- League of Torgau (1526–1531), the earliest league of Protestant princes against the Catholic League of Dessau, succeeded by the Schmalkaldic League
- Schmalkaldic League (1531–1546), a league of Protestant princes against the Holy Roman Emperor
- Protestant Union (1608–1621), a league of Protestant states against the Catholic League
- Heilbronn League (1633–1635), a league of western and southern Protestant German states under Swedish and French guidance
