= Electoral College (Holy Roman Empire) =

Gathering to vote for the next king

Coat of arms of the Holy Roman Empire. At the top are the coats of arms of the prince electors

The Electoral College (German: Kur; Latin: Collegium Electorale) of the Holy Roman Empire was the gathering of prince electors for an imperial election, where they voted for the next King of the Romans and future Emperor. The German name of this gathering, Kur, is derived from the Middle High German kur or kure ("election").

Initially all the so-called "great ones of the Empire" (Große des Reiches) were entitled to vote, but by the second half of the 13th century, only the prince electors were entitled to participate in the royal election.
