= Hans Backoffen =

German sculptor

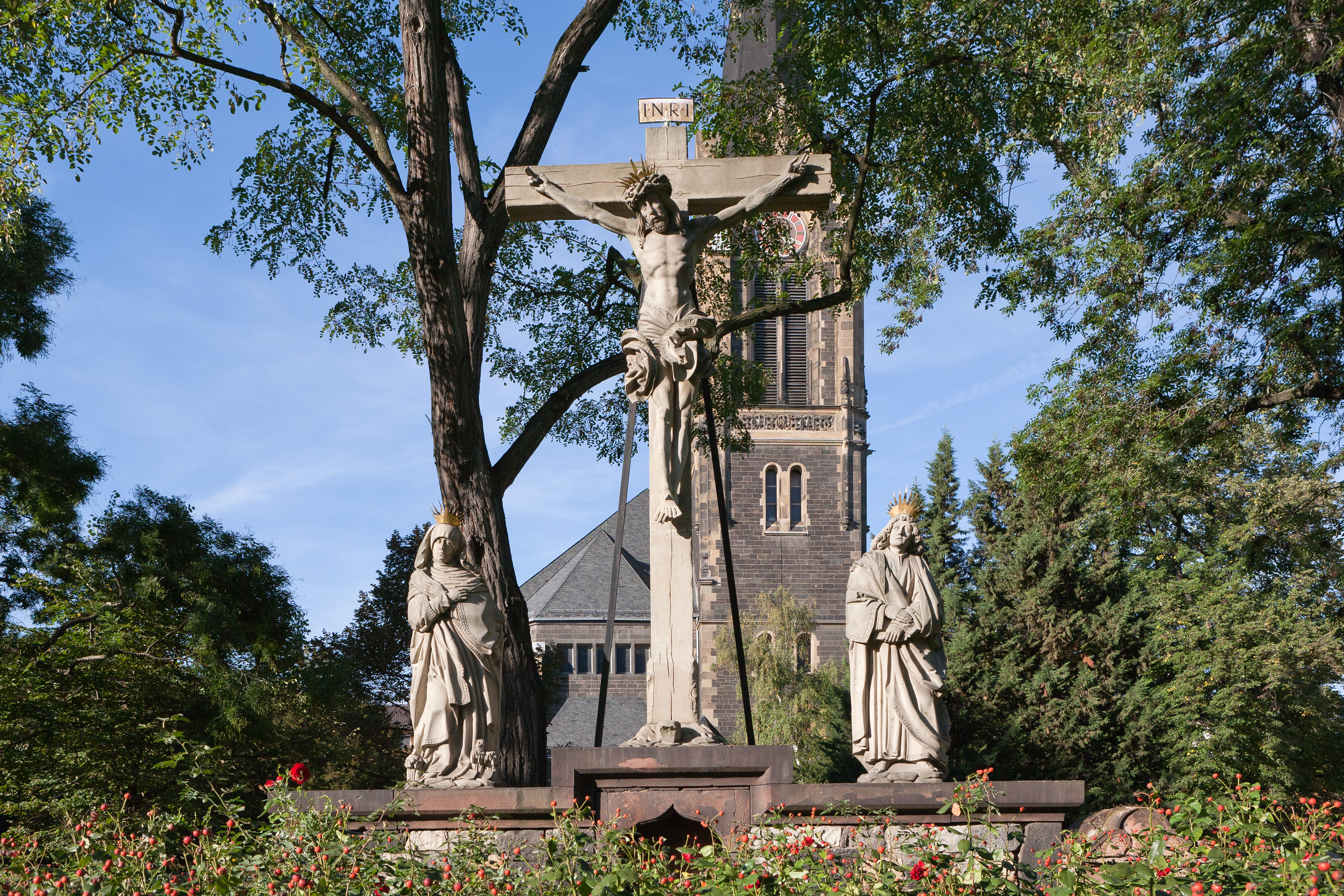
Crucifixion (1510-1511), Frankfurt am Main

Hans Backoffen (c. 1460-1475 — 21 September 1519, Mainz) was a German sculptor.
