= Common Penny =

The Common Penny (German: Gemeiner Pfennig or Imperial Penny Reichspfennig) was an imperial tax (Reichssteuer) that was agreed at the instigation of Maximilian I in 1495 at the Diet of Worms, in order to give the emperor the means to wage war against France and against the Osman regime in the Ottoman Empire.

The tax was to be paid by all subjects of the Holy Roman Empire of the German Nation aged 15 years or more. It was designed as a poll tax, income tax and property tax that depended on personal status and wealth. Its recovery ran into so many difficulties everywhere that it was explicitly abandoned in 1505. After the Hussite Penny (Hussitenpfennig) in 1427, it was another attempt to introduce an imperial tax and was part of the comprehensive, but ultimately unsuccessful Imperial Reform under Emperor Maximilian. The successor of the Common Penny as an imperial tax was the Kammerzieler.

== Literature ==
- Eberhard Isenmann: The Holy Roman Empire in the Middle Ages. In: The Rise of the Fiscal State in Europe. ca. 1200–1815. Herausgegeben von Richard Bonney, Oxford 1999, pp. 243–280, here pp. 265–267.
- Eberhard Isenmann: Reichsfinanzen und Reichssteuern im 15. Jahrhundert. In: Zeitschrift für Historische Forschung 7. 1980, pp. 1–76, 129–218.
- Peter Moraw: Der »Gemeine Pfennig«. In: Mit dem Zehnten fing es an. Published by U. Schultz, 1986, pp. 130–142.
- Peter Schmid: Der gemeine Pfennig von 1495. Vorgeschichte und Entstehung, verfassungsgeschichtliche, politische und finanzielle Bedeutung. (zugleich Habilitation Regensburg 1986), Göttingen, 1989, In: Schriftenreihe der Historischen Kommission bei der Bayerischen Akademie der Wissenschaften 34.
