= Ewiger Landfriede =

1495 law of the Holy Roman Empire

The Ewiger Landfriede ("everlasting Landfriede", variously translated as "Perpetual Peace", "Eternal Peace", "Perpetual Public Peace") of 1495, passed by Maximilian I, German king and emperor of the Holy Roman Empire, was the definitive and everlasting ban on the medieval right of vendetta (Fehderecht). In fact, despite being officially outlawed, feuds continued in the territory of the empire until well into the 16th century.

The Ewiger Landfriede graduated from the development of the peace movement (Landfriedensbewegung), which, after initial attempts in the 12th century, had its first significant success in the Treaty of Mainz in 1235. It was aimed primarily at the lesser nobles who had not kept pace with the process of development of the princely territories. Their propensity to feuding (Fehdefreudigkeit) increasingly went against the intent of the imperial princes and imperial cities to pacify and consolidate their territories.

Claims were henceforth no longer to be decided in battle, but confirmed through legal process. The imperial act was passed on 7 August 1495 at the Diet of Worms. In theory, at least, the use of violence to resolve disputes was replaced by settlements in the courts of the empire and its territories, even if the establishment of this principle took several further generations. In a modern sense, the Ewiger Landfriede formally gave the monopoly on violence to the state or the public sector.

The formulation of the Ewiger Landfriede conformed with parallel developments in other European countries at that time, where the monopoly of the state in the use of force was also established, because internal conflicts were to be resolved by legal process. This was, of course, accompanied by the concentration of power in the ruling monarch. In these countries, the process of nation-building was completed to such an extent that they were able to establish clear external borders.

In addition to establishing the monopoly of the use of force by the state, the Ewiger Landfriede is important in other respects as well. It was universal and applicable everywhere, and violations were to be strictly punished wherever they occurred. There had been ad hoc or temporary restrictions on the right of vendetta even in medieval times. For example, conflicts were suspended or banned during the Crusades during the period of absence of the emperor from the Reich. Now, however, in place of princely mediation and decision making in individual cases, there was a mandatory rule of law for everyone, a universal law.

The enforcement of the act required a functioning judiciary in the kingdom. To preserve the Ewiger Landfriede, the Imperial Chamber Court (Reichskammergericht) in Frankfurt was created as the supreme legal authority; it was later moved to Speyer and, later, Wetzlar. In 1500, the newly created imperial circles (Reichskreise) were made responsible for the enforcement of the Ewiger Landfriede in the individual regions. The maintenance of peace in the empire was no longer the sole prerogative of the king, because the Imperial Chamber Court and the imperial circles were corporate bodies or formed from the imperial estates (Reichsstände).

The preservation of peace (Landfrieden) is still an important part of German law. Breaches of the peace are punishable under the Strafgesetzbuch (§ 125 StGB bzw. § 274 Ö-StGB, Art. 260 CH-StGB). The state acknowledges the right of individuals to ensure their own rights by force only in very limited circumstances (e.g., in self-defence).

== Literature ==
- Historische Kommission bei der Bayerischen Akademie der Wissenschaften (ed.): Deutsche Reichstagsakten. Mittlere Reihe: Deutsche Reichstagsakten unter Maximilian I. Vol. 5: Heinz Angermeier (revised.): Reichstag von Worms 1495. 3 volumes. Vandenhoeck & Ruprecht, Göttingen, 1981, ISBN 3-525-35406-1.
- Mattias G. Fischer: Reichsreform und „Ewiger Landfrieden“. Über die Entwicklung des Fehderechts im 15. Jahrhundert bis zum absoluten Fehdeverbot von 1495. Scientia, Aalen 2007, ISBN 978-3-511-02854-1 (Untersuchungen zur deutschen Staats- und Rechtsgeschichte. NF 34), (also: Göttingen, Univ., Diss., 2002).
- Axel Gotthard: Das Alte Reich. 1495–1806. Wissenschaftliche Buchgesellschaft, Darmstadt 2003, ISBN 3-534-15118-6 (Geschichte kompakt – Neuzeit).
- Hanns Hubert Hofmann (ed.): Quellen zum Verfassungsorganismus des Heiligen Römischen Reiches Deutscher Nation 1495–1815. Wissenschaftliche Buchgesellschaft, Darmstadt, 1976, ISBN 3-534-01959-8 (Ausgewählte Quellen zur deutschen Geschichte der Neuzeit 13).
- Elmar Wadle: Der Ewige Landfriede von 1495 und das Ende der mittelalterlichen Friedensbewegung. In: Claudia Helm, Jost Hausmann (Red.): 1495 – Kaiser, Reich, Reformen. Der Reichstag zu Worms. (Exhibition of the state main archives at Koblenz together with the city of Worms on the 500th anniversary of the Diet of Worms of 1495). Landeshauptarchiv, Koblenz, 1995, ISBN 3-931014-20-7 pp. 71–80 (Publications of the state archive authority of Rhineland-Palatinate).
