= Devil's Slide =

Devil's Slide is the name of several geological formations. It may refer to:

- Devil's Slide (California), a promontory in the San Francisco Bay Area
- Devil's Slide (Utah), a rock formation in Utah
- Devil's Slide (Montana), a rock formation in Montana
- A portion of the Old Santa Susana Stage Road in Southern California
- A rock formation on the Hawaiian island of Nīhoa
- A rock formation on the island of Lundy, England
- Teufelsrutsch, a rock formation in Germany
- "Devil's Slide", a song by Joe Satriani on his album Engines of Creation
