= Peter of Aspelt =

- Archbishop of Mainz
- Church: Catholic Church
- Diocese: Electorate of Mainz
- In office: 1306–1320

Personal details
- Born: 1240/1245
- Died: 5 June 1320

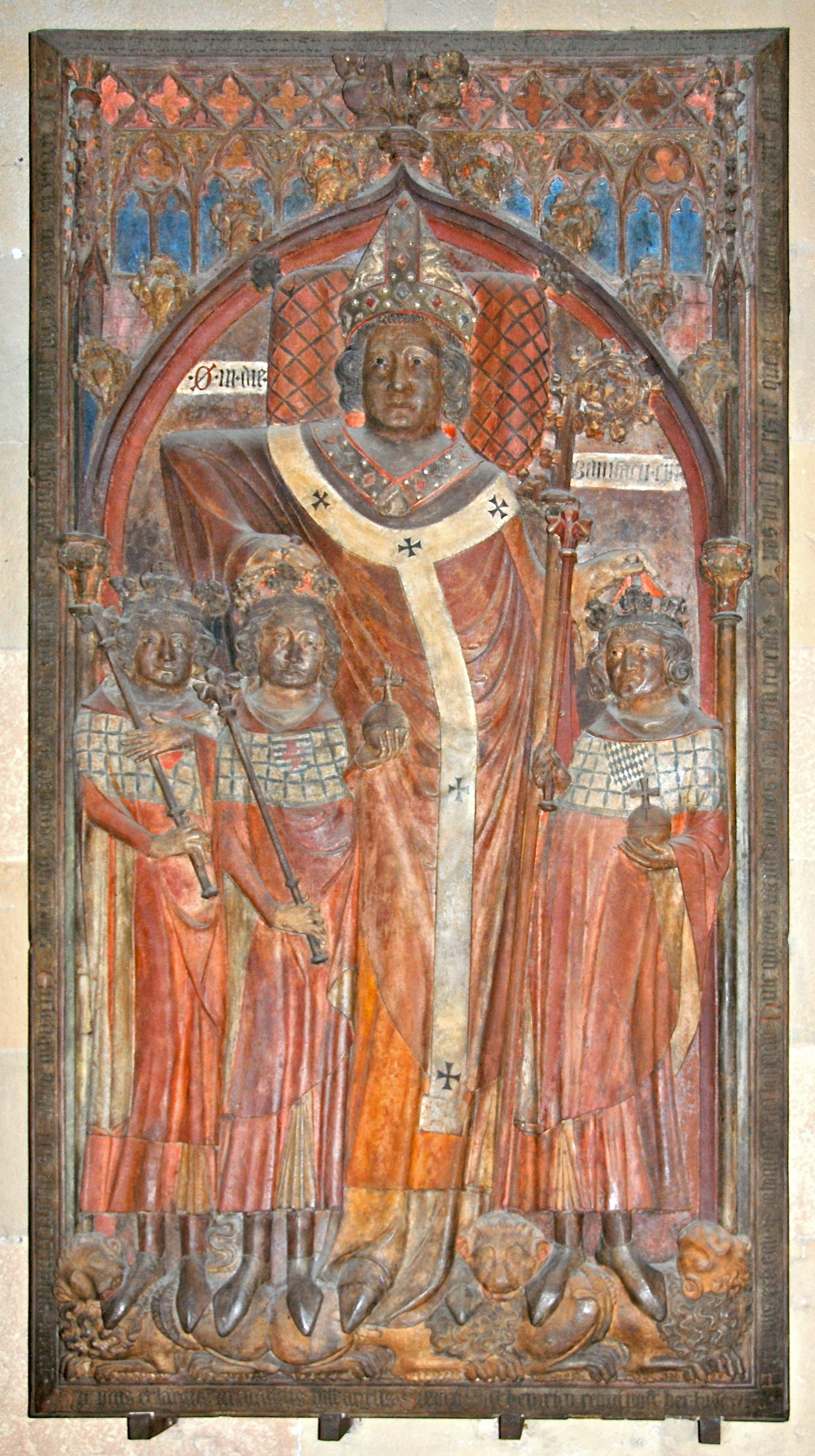
Red sandstone slab from the tomb of Peter von Aspelt in Mainz Cathedral. From the left: John the Blind, his father Henry VII, Peter von Aspelt, Louis the Bavarian.

Peter of Aspelt (a.k.a. Peter von Aichspelt, Peter von Basel, Peter von Mainz; born 1240/45, died 5 June 1320 in Mainz) was Archbishop of Mainz from 1306 to 1320, and an influential political figure of the period. He brought the archbishopric to its peak of power.

== Life ==
It is assumed that Peter of Aspelt was born between 1240 and 1245, either in Aspelt, a small village in the County of Luxembourg, about 50 km west of Trier, or in Trier. His father Gerhard worked as a servant at St. Maximin's Abbey in Trier. Peter attended school in Trier, continuing his studies of theology and philosophy, as well as law and medicine, at the universities in Padua, Bologna and Paris. In 1280, he became a pastor in Riol and Birtlingen. In 1286, he obtained the prebend of St. Martin in Bingen am Rhein which was annexed to a canonry of Mainz Cathedral. In the same year, he was appointed chaplain and personal physician to Rudolf of Habsburg, German King of the Romans since 1273.

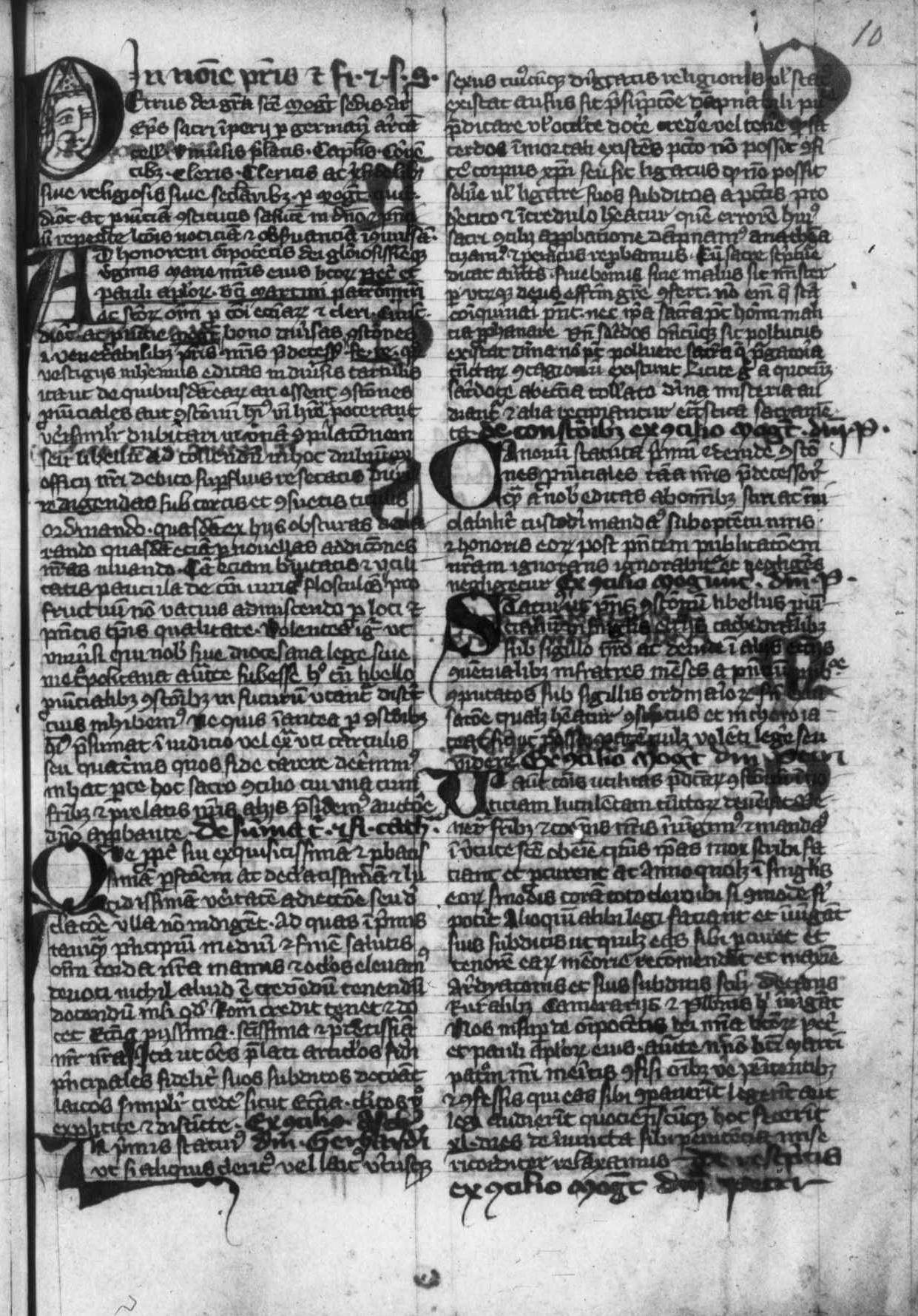
Statuta provincialia, 14th-century manuscript

Peter of Aspelt later became an opponent of the Habsburgs on the wider European stage. At that time, the Archbishopric of Mainz had strong ties with the realm of Bohemia. Not only did Bohemia form a part of the ecclesiastical province of Mainz, in addition, Count Siegfried II of Eppstein (1200–30) had received in 1228 the right to crown the King of Bohemia-a right retained by Mainz until 1343. Thus, after being rejected to join the cathedral chapter at the Archbishopric of Trier, Peter entered the service of Wenceslaus II, King of Bohemia, in 1289, serving him as prothonotary, and as chancellor from 1296 onwards. In March 1297, Peter was appointed Bishop of Basel by Pope Boniface VIII. He remained in that position until 1306, when he was made Archbishop of Mainz by Pope Clement V succeeding Gerhard II of Eppstein (1286–1305) who had died in the previous year. The Archbishop of Mainz not only was an influential ecclesiastic person, as Prince-elector of Mainz and Archchancellor of the Empire, he also was one of the mightiest secular persons in the Holy Roman Empire. Under Peter of Aspelt Mainz attained the pinnacle of its power.

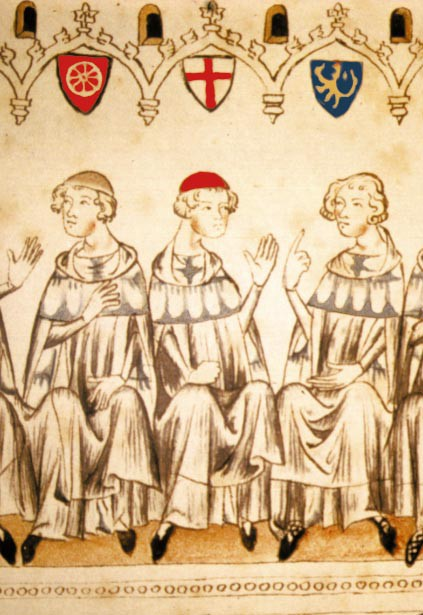
Prince-elector of Mainz Peter of Aspelt (left) in Frankfurt in November 1308.

Peter not only supported Baldwin, a brother of Henry VII, Count of Luxemburg, in his election as Archbishop-Elector of Trier, but also instigated the election of Henry VII as German King of the Romans. Henry was elected with six votes at Frankfurt on 27 November 1308. He was crowned Holy Roman Emperor under the title of Henry VII in 1312, but died already in August of the following year in Italy.

A 1310 confrontation with the Knights Templar led in due course to his taking a protective line towards them.

Peter administered the County of Luxemburg and the Bohemian realm during the minority of Henry's son, John of Bohemia, also known as John the Blind. whom he helped become King of Bohemia, crowning him on 7 February 1311. However, after the death of Holy Roman Emperor Henry VII in 1313, the Luxemburg party among the prince electors set aside Henry's son, King John of Bohemia, because of his youth and chose Louis the Bavarian from the House of Wittelsbach as rival king to Frederick the Fair. Louis was elected in October 1314 upon the instigation of Peter of Aspelt with five of the seven votes. Then Louis was hastily crowned German King of the Romans by Peter in Aachen, while Frederick was crowned in Bonn by the Prince-Elector of Cologne. A bloody conflict broke out between the two kings and lasted for years, while Pope John XXII tried to stay neutral in the first years. Finally, Frederick was decisively defeated in the Battle of Mühldorf in 1322. Louis IV became Holy Roman Emperor in 1328. Peter von Aspelt, however, did not live long enough to witness this. He had already died in 1320. Matthias von Buchegg succeeded him as Archbishop of Mainz in 1321.

In his testament, dated 25 August 1319, Peter, Archbishop of Mainz, bequeathed property to the members of his widespread family, among them Johannes de Treveri, a canon at Mainz, whom he calls "nepoti nostro" (our nephew).

Peter von Aspelt is buried in Mainz Cathedral.

== Notes ==
Catholic Church titles
Preceded by Peter Reich von Reichenstein	Prince-Bishop of Basel; 1297–1306	Succeeded by Otto of Grandson
Preceded by Gerhard II of Eppstein	Archbishop-Elector of Mainz; 1306–1320	Succeeded by Matthias von Buchegg
