= Bingen am Rhein =

- Town
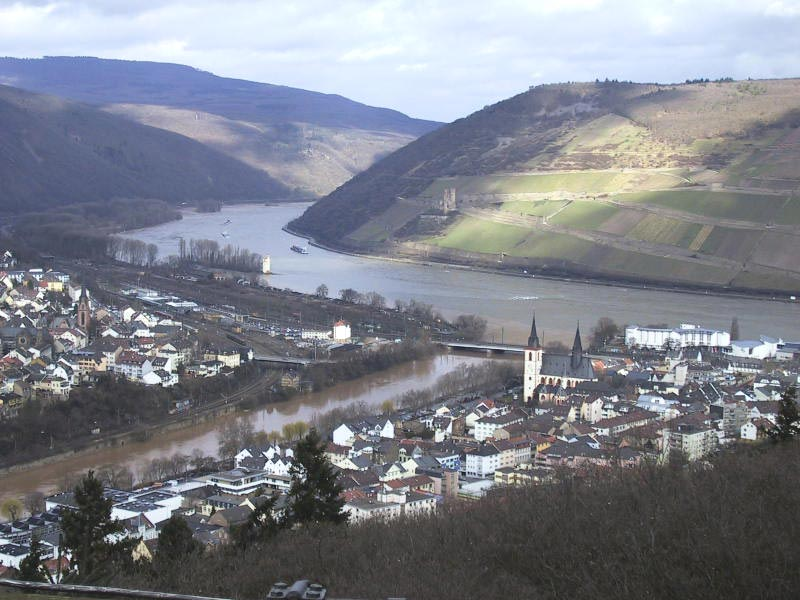

- Coat of arms

- Location of Bingen am Rhein within Mainz-Bingen district
- Interactive map of Bingen am Rhein
- Location within Germany Location within Rhineland-Palatinate
- Coordinates: 49°58′N 7°54′E
- Country: Germany
- State: Rhineland-Palatinate
- District: Mainz-Bingen
- Subdivisions: 8

Government
  - Mayor (2019–27): Thomas Feser (CDU)

Area
  - Total: 37.71 km^{2} (14.56 sq mi)
- Elevation: 89 m (292 ft)

Population (2025-12-31)
  - Total: 25,424
  - Density: 674.2/km^{2} (1,746/sq mi)
- Time zone: UTC+01:00 (CET)
  - Summer (DST): UTC+02:00 (CEST)
- Postal codes: 55411
- Dialling codes: 06721-06725
- Vehicle registration: MZ, BIN
- Website: www.bingen.de

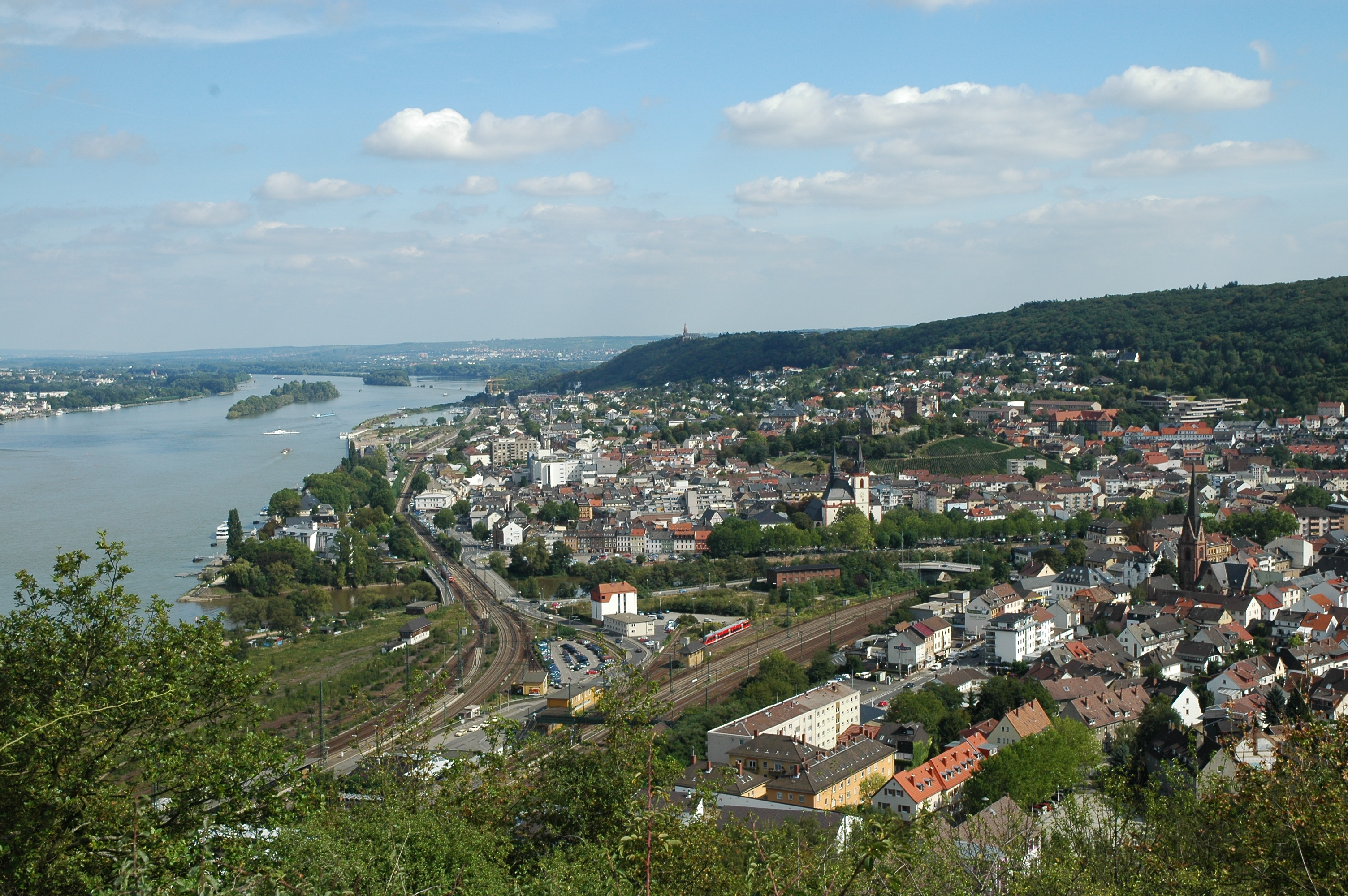
Bingen and Bingerbrück from the Elisenhöhe (heights)

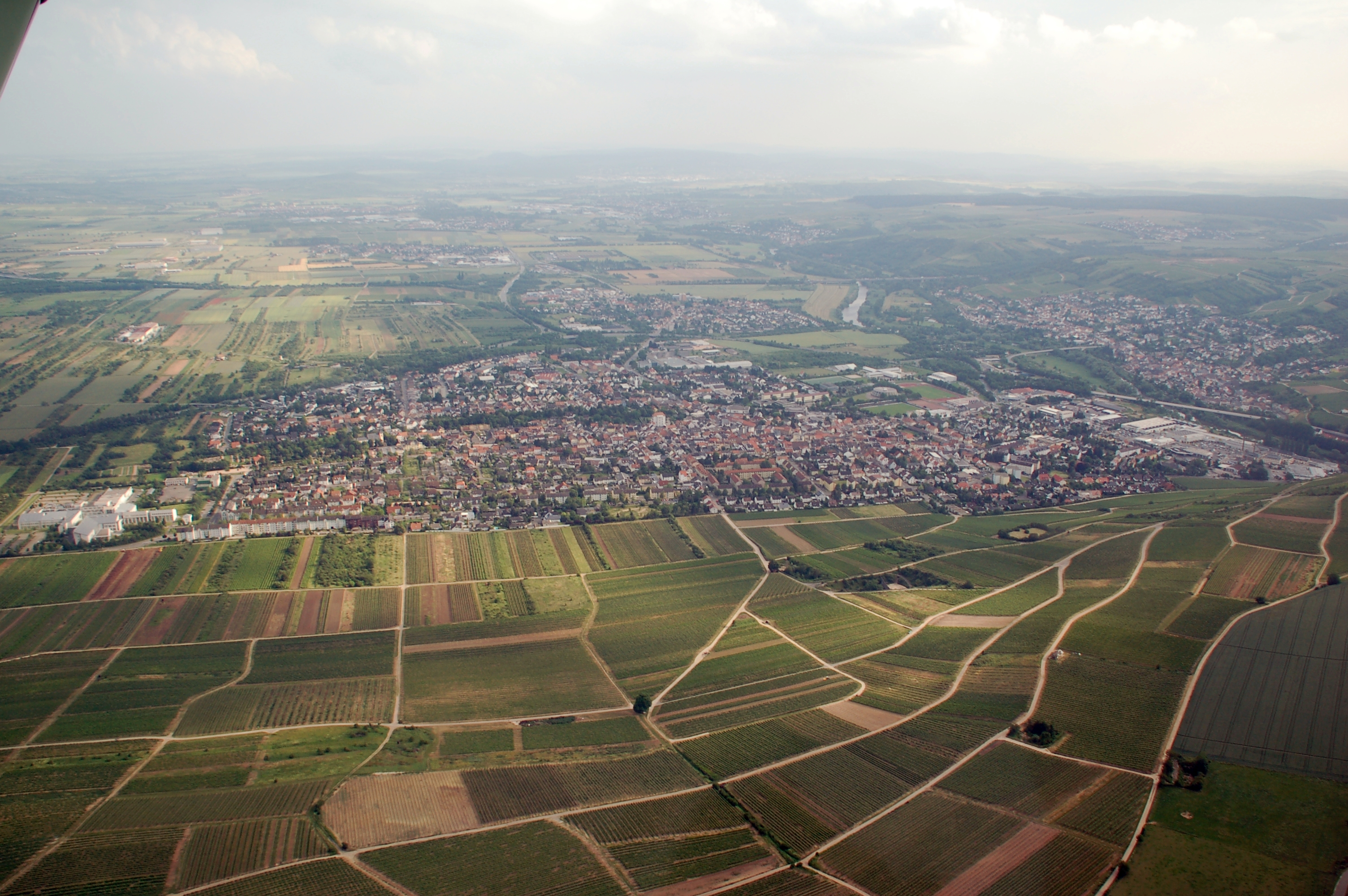
Outlying centre of Büdesheim

Bingen am Rhein (German pronunciation: [ˈbɪŋən ʔam ˈʁaɪn], lit. 'Bingen on the Rhine') is a town in the Mainz-Bingen district in Rhineland-Palatinate, Germany.

The settlement's original name was Bingium, a Celtic word that may have meant "hole in the rock", a description of the shoal behind the Mouse Tower (German: Mäuseturm), known as the Binger Loch. Bingen was the starting point for the Via Ausonia, a Roman military road that linked the town with Trier. Bingen is well known for, among other things, the legend about the Mouse Tower, in which Hatto II, the Archbishop of Mainz, was allegedly eaten by mice. Since the 19th century, the legend has increasingly been attributed to Hatto I, a predecessor of Hatto II. Saint Hildegard von Bingen, an important polymath, abbess, mystic and musician, one of the most influential medieval composers and one of the earliest Western composers whose music is widely preserved and performed, was born 40 km away from Bingen, in Bermersheim vor der Höhe. A new museum on the riverside is largely devoted to her and the romance of the Rhine Gorge. Bingen am Rhein was also the birthplace of the poet Stefan George, along with many other influential figures.

== Geography ==
=== Location ===
Bingen is situated just southeast of the Rhine knee by the Bingen Forest (Binger Wald – actually a low mountain range), which rises west of the town. Rising to the north on the other side of the Rhine is the Rheingau range, the Taunus's southwesternmost outcrop. In Bingen the river Nahe empties into the Rhine Gorge. Bingen forms the southern limit of the UNESCO Rhine Gorge World Heritage Site. The Rochusberg hill and park are nearly surrounded by the town, its castle now a hotel.

=== Constituent communities ===
- Bingerbrück
- Büdesheim
- Dietersheim
- Gaulsheim
- Dromersheim, icewine's birthplace, first documentary mention in 754
- Inner town
- Kempten am Rhein
- Sponsheim

=== Population development ===
(each time at 31 December)

Year	1998	2000	2002	2004	2006	2008	2010
Inhabitants	24,821	24,710	24,786	24,849	24,587	24,398	25,833

== History ==
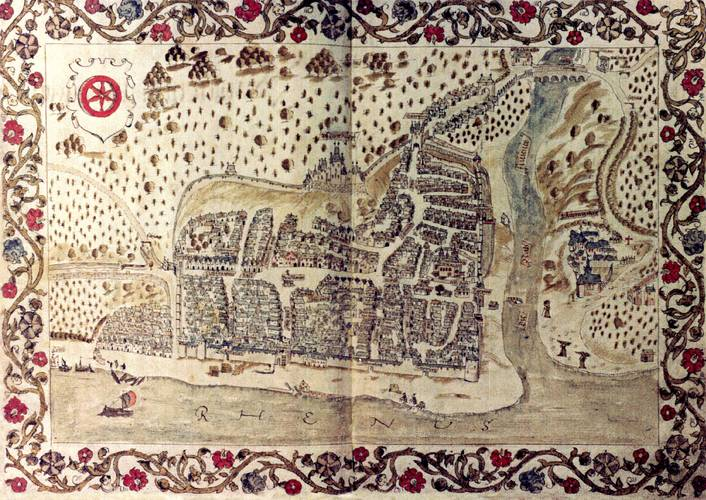
Gottfried Mascop: town map from 1577

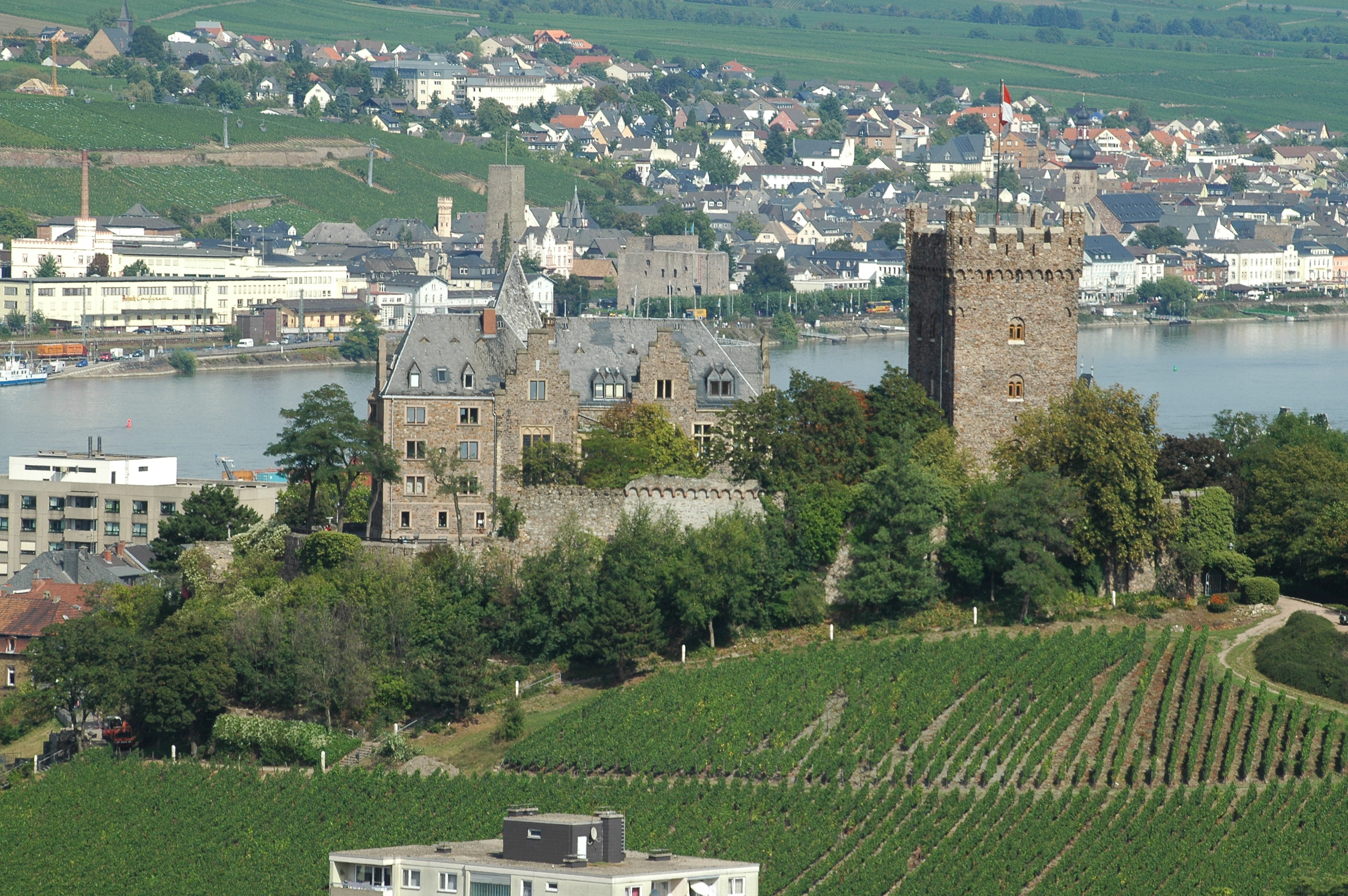
Klopp Castle

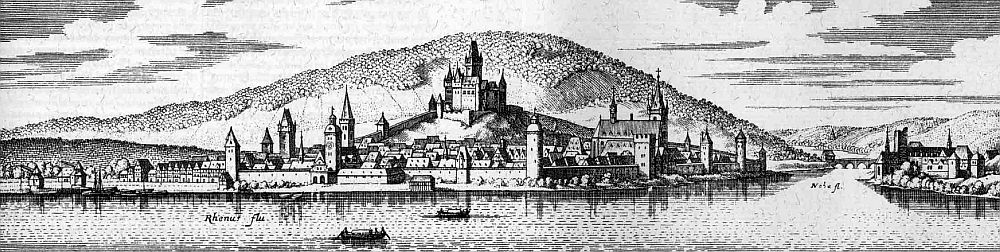
Bingen – excerpt from Topographia Hassiae from Matthäus Merian the Younger, 1655

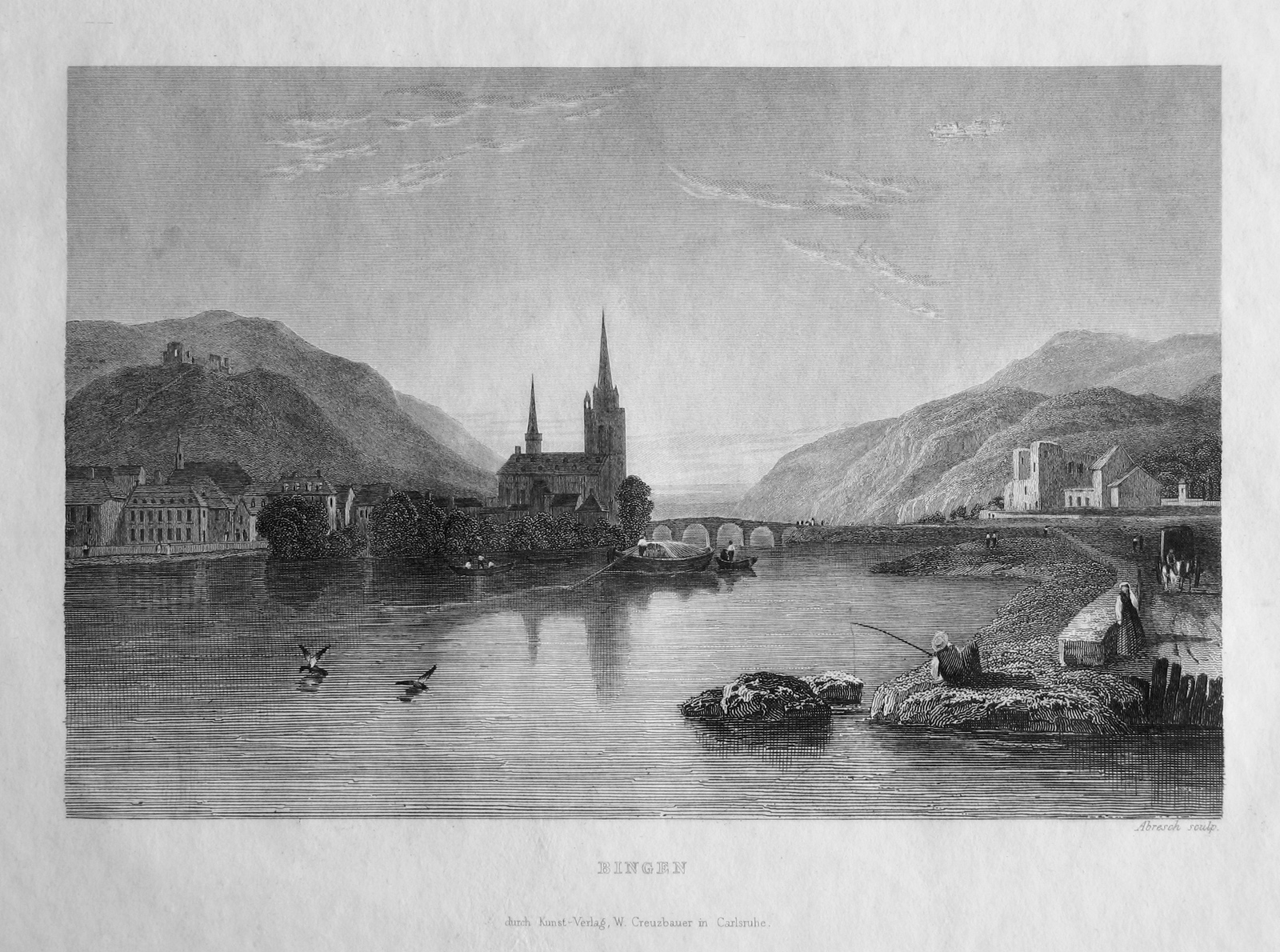
Engraving by Clarkson Frederick Stanfield

=== Antiquity ===
Even before the Romans came, people lived here, because the location favoured transport, being at the confluence of the Nahe and Rhine Rivers, and the Rhine's entry into the gorge. The first settlement seems to have been a Celtic (Gaulish) settlement by the name of Binge – meaning "rift". In the early first century AD, Roman troops were stationed in Bingen on the Rhine Valley Road, and rendered the local name as Bingium in Latin. There the Romans erected a wooden bridge across the Nahe and constructed a bridgehead castrum. A Roman Mithraic monument, which included a mutilated sculpture representing the nativity of Mithra from a rock, was discovered in Bingen; one of its inscriptions is dated 236.

=== Medieval period ===
The presbyter Aetherius of Bingen founded sometime between 335 and 360 a firmly Christian community. Bearing witness to this time is Aetherius's gravestone, which can still be seen in Saint Martin's Basilica. After the fall of the Limes, the town became a Frankish royal estate and passed in 983 by the Donation of Verona from Otto II to Archbishop Willigis of Mainz. Under Otto III the Binger Kammerforst (forest) came into being. Under Willigis, some way up the river Nahe, the stone Drususbrücke (bridge) was built.

The inhabitants of Bingen strove time and again for independence, which led in 1165 through disputes between the Archbishop of Mainz and the Emperor to destruction. In the 13th century, Bingen was a member of the Rhenish League of Towns. The building of Klopp Castle (Burg Klopp) in the mid 13th century could well be seen as being tied in with this development. A last attempt was the town's unsuccessful participation in the German Peasants' War in 1525. From the Archbishop the Cathedral Chapter of Mainz acquired the town in two halves in 1424 and 1438. Until the late 18th century Bingen remained under its administration. Like many towns in the valley, Bingen suffered several town fires and wars.

=== Modern period ===
From 1792 to 1813, the town was, as part of the département of Mont-Tonnerre (or Donnersberg – both names meaning "Thunder Mountain"), French after French Revolutionary troops had occupied the Rhine's left bank. In 1816, after the Congress of Vienna, the town passed to the Grand Duchy of Hesse-Darmstadt while today's outlying centre of Bingerbrück went to Prussia's Rhine Province, making Bingen a border town until 1871, when the German Empire was founded.

On 7 June 1969, the formerly Prussian municipality of Bingerbrück was amalgamated. On 22 April 1972 came Dromersheim's and Sponsheim's amalgamation with Bingen. The epithet am Rhein has been borne since 1 July 1982.

For the State Garden Show in 2008 in Bingen, the Rhineside areas in the town underwent extensive modernization.

=== Jewish history ===
Benjamin of Tudela mentioned a Jewish community in Bingen in the mid-12th century. Christian inhabitants attacked the small Jewish quarter on Rosh Hashanah in 1198 or 1199, and the Jews were driven from the city. Jews again lived in Bingen as moneylenders in the middle of the 13th century under the jurisdiction of the archbishop of Mainz. In 1343, French Jews settled in Bingen. In 1405, the archbishop declared a moratorium on one-fifth of the debts owed to Jews by Christians, and subsequently the archbishops repeatedly extorted large sums. Noted rabbis who taught in the small community included Seligmann Oppenheim, who convened the Council of Bingen (1455–56) in an unsuccessful attempt to establish his authority over the whole of Rhineland Jewry. After the proposal was opposed by Moses Minz, the matter was referred to Isaac Isserlein, who rejected the project. The Jews were again expelled from Bingen in 1507, and did not return until the second half of the 16th century. The Jewish population was 465 in 1933, and 222 in 1939 due to flight and emigration. The 169 Jews who remained in Bingen in 1942 were sent to concentration camps, and only four ultimately returned. The synagogue was demolished in 1945, and the community was not reestablished after World War II.

== Politics ==
=== Town council ===
The council is made up of 36 members. The mayor since 2012 has been the CDU politician Thomas Feser. Seats are apportioned thus:

	SPD	CDU	FDP	Grüne	FWG	Linke	Total
2019	11	11	3	6	3	2	36 seats
2014	12	16	2	4	2	-	36 seats
2009	10	16	4	4	2	-	36 seats
2004	10	18	3	3	2	-	36 seats

=== Coat of arms ===
The town's arms show Saint Martin cutting off a piece of his cloak for a poor man and, in a small inescutcheon in dexter chief, the Wheel of Mainz.

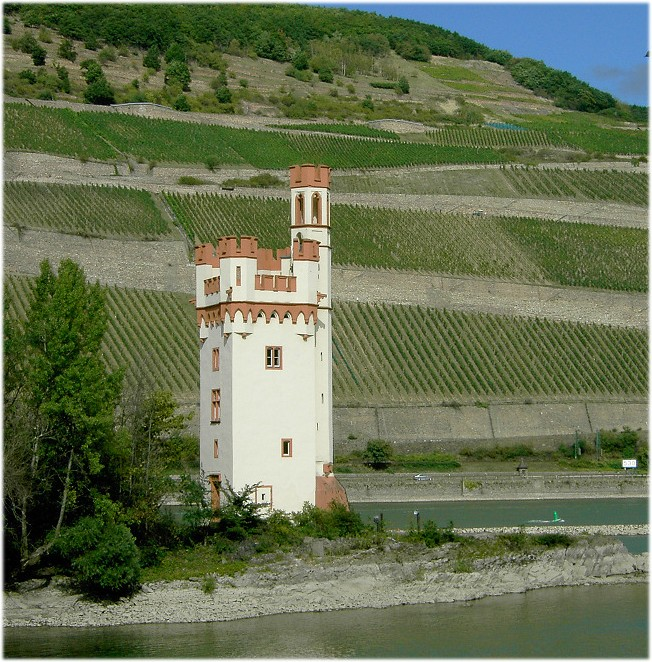
The Binger Mäuseturm

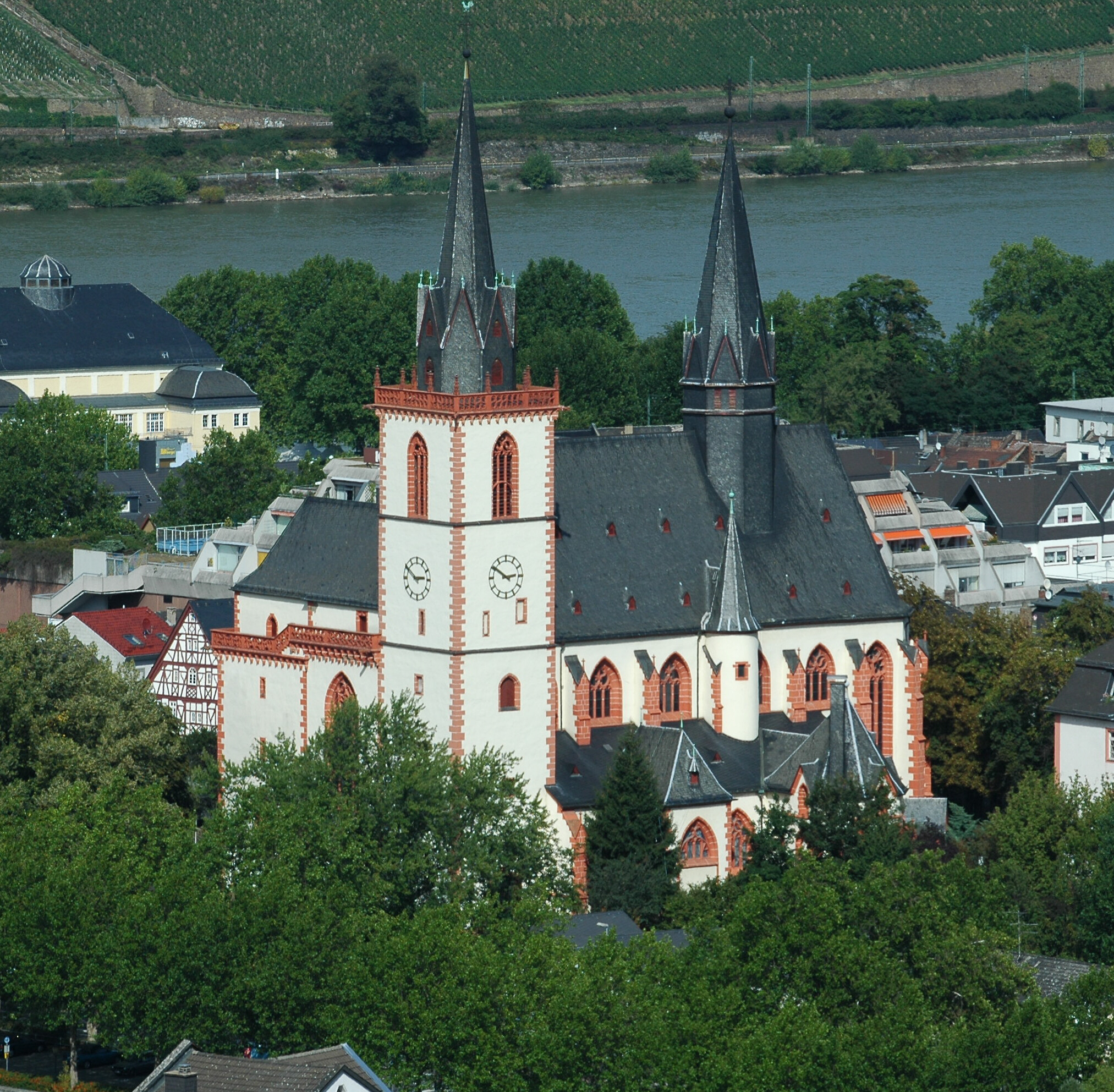
Basilica of St. Martin

== Main sights ==
- Mouse Tower
- Former monastery church, the Basilica of St. Martin, from the 15th century with Romanesque crypt
- Klopp Castle (Burg Klopp)
- Rochuskapelle
- Drususbrücke (bridge) with Romanesque bridge chapel
- Old Rhine Crane from 1487
- River Pilot Museum
- Haferkasten ("Oat Shed", from after 1689) with Stefan-George-Museum
- Puricellipalais, an Empire style building from 1780
- Old Graveyard from the 19th century with monument for Napoleonic war veterans
- Historical Museum on the theme "Hildegard of Bingen"
- Roman villa rustica in the Bingen Forest
- Rhine Floodplain Special Protection Area
- Bingerbrück Reiter Signal Box, technological cultural monument
- A new concept was introduced with the Route der Industriekultur Rhein-Main ("Rhine-Main Industrial Culture Route"), along which industrial building works on the 160 km between Miltenberg and Bingen are linked together into an adventure route about the Industrial Age in southern Germany. Already 700 buildings are scientifically catalogued. The historic crane and the industrial crane in Bingen are part of industrial monuments in Bingen.

== Culture ==
=== Bingen 2008 State Garden Show ===
Bingen was from 18 April to 19 October 2008 host for the Rhineland-Palatinate State Garden Show. The event was held along a 2.8 km stretch of the Rhine waterfront on 24 ha of exhibition area. With 1.3 million visitors, the expected number of 600,000 was greatly exceeded.

In 2029, Bingen will participate in the Federal Garden Show which takes place along the Rhine from Bingen to Koblenz.

=== Regular events ===
- Bingen swingt – jazz festival
- Binger Open Air Festival – Alternative festival
- Breakpoint – worldwide, one of the demoscene's biggest events (no longer held)
- Nacht der Verführung – (literally "Night of Seduction") wine festival in the vines
- Rhein im Feuerzauber – great firework event
- Rochusfest (Saint Roch's Festival) – church festival with folk character, Bishopric of Mainz pilgrimage
- Winzerfest (winemakers' festival) – lasting 11 days, the longest wine festival on the Rhine

== Economy and infrastructure ==
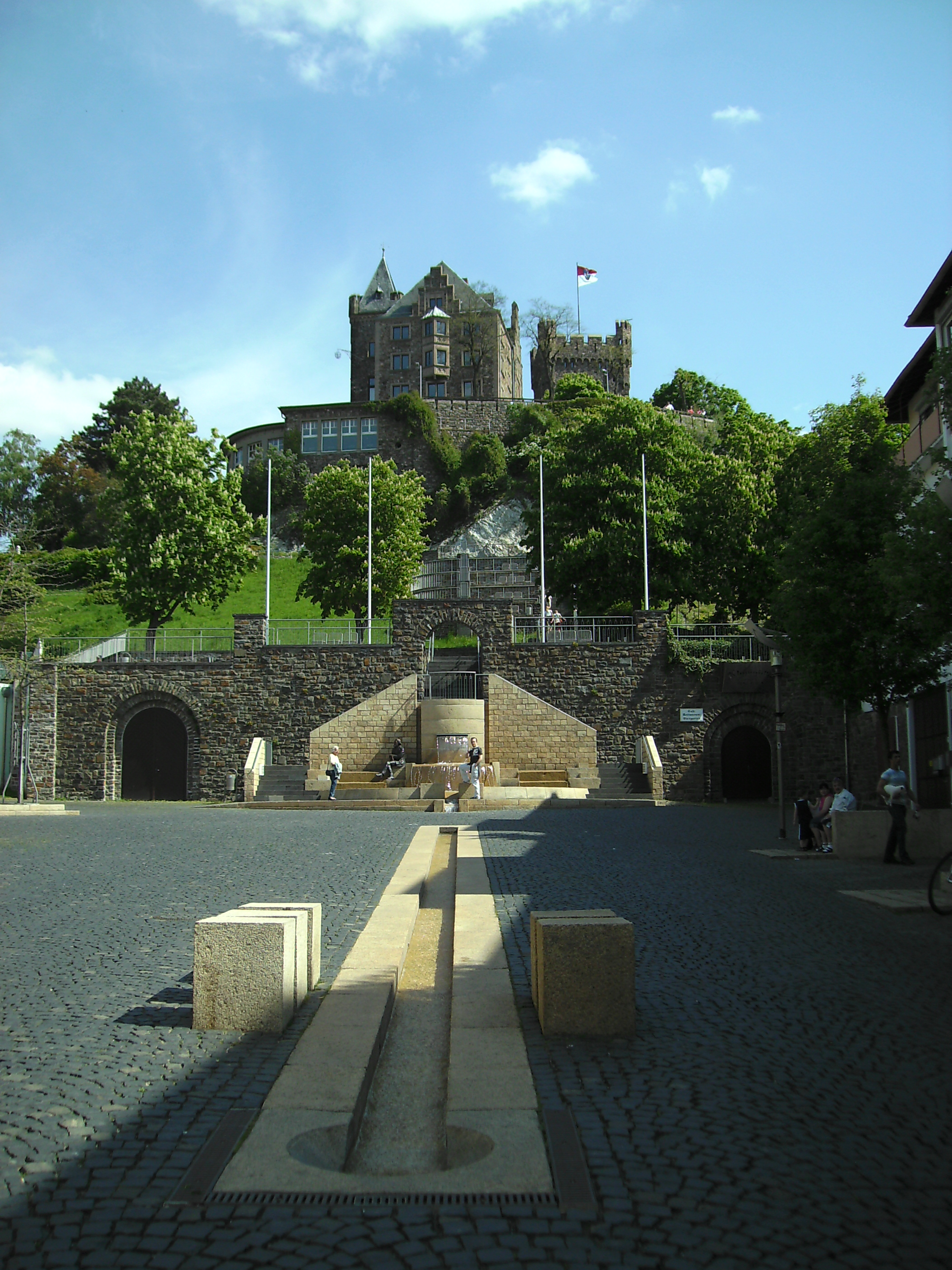
Klopp Castle with modern spring complex

The region is characterized economically by winegrowing, especially as in Bingen three winegrowing areas (Rheinhessen, Mittelrhein and Nahe) meet. The town is also the winegrowing Bereich's (Bereich Bingen) namesake in German wine law.

Other industries that once did business in Bingen when there was a harbour have left the town over the years. The service industries here today are found mainly in the industrial park (Autobahn interchange Bingen-Ost / Kempten / Industriegebiet) and in the Scharlachberg commercial park.

Tourism also plays an important role, also less than before World War One when luxurious hotels attracted travelers from all over Europe. Bingen is an important starting point for Rhine trips as there are only a few steps from the railway station or bus stops to the boats. Bingen hosts many events like "Rhine in Flames" or the longest Wine Festival along the Rhine.

=== Resident businesses ===
- Löwen Entertainment, former NSM-Löwen (slot machines), now part of Novomatik
- Reh Kendermann
- Rheinberg Kellerei
- Carl Graeger Sparkling wine
- Binderer St. Ursula
- Bingen-Rüdesheimer Passenger ship company
- Gewa Etiketten
- Viprinet
- Oerlikon Balzers Coating Germany GmbH

=== Transport ===
==== Rail ====
The main railway station, Bingen (Rhein) Hauptbahnhof, lies in the outlying centre of Bingerbrück. It is served by InterCity trains as well as one ICE line.

Bingen (Rhein) Stadt station lies 2 km farther east, right across from the historical harbour crane. This station is important only for local transport. There is also a stop in Bingen-Gaulsheim. The reason that two railway stations arose in Bingen is historical. The main railway station was originally a Prussian border station built by the Rhenish Railway Company on its West Rhine Railway, whilst the station in town belonged to the Hessian Ludwig Railway.

The stops at Drususbrücke on the Bingen Hbf-Bad Kreuznach line and Bingen-Kempten and Büdesheim-Dromersheim on the Bingen/Rhein Stadt–Alzey line are no longer served.

==== Road ====
Bingen lies next to Autobahnen A 60 and A 61, which are linked to the town by Bundesstraße 9.

==== Water ====
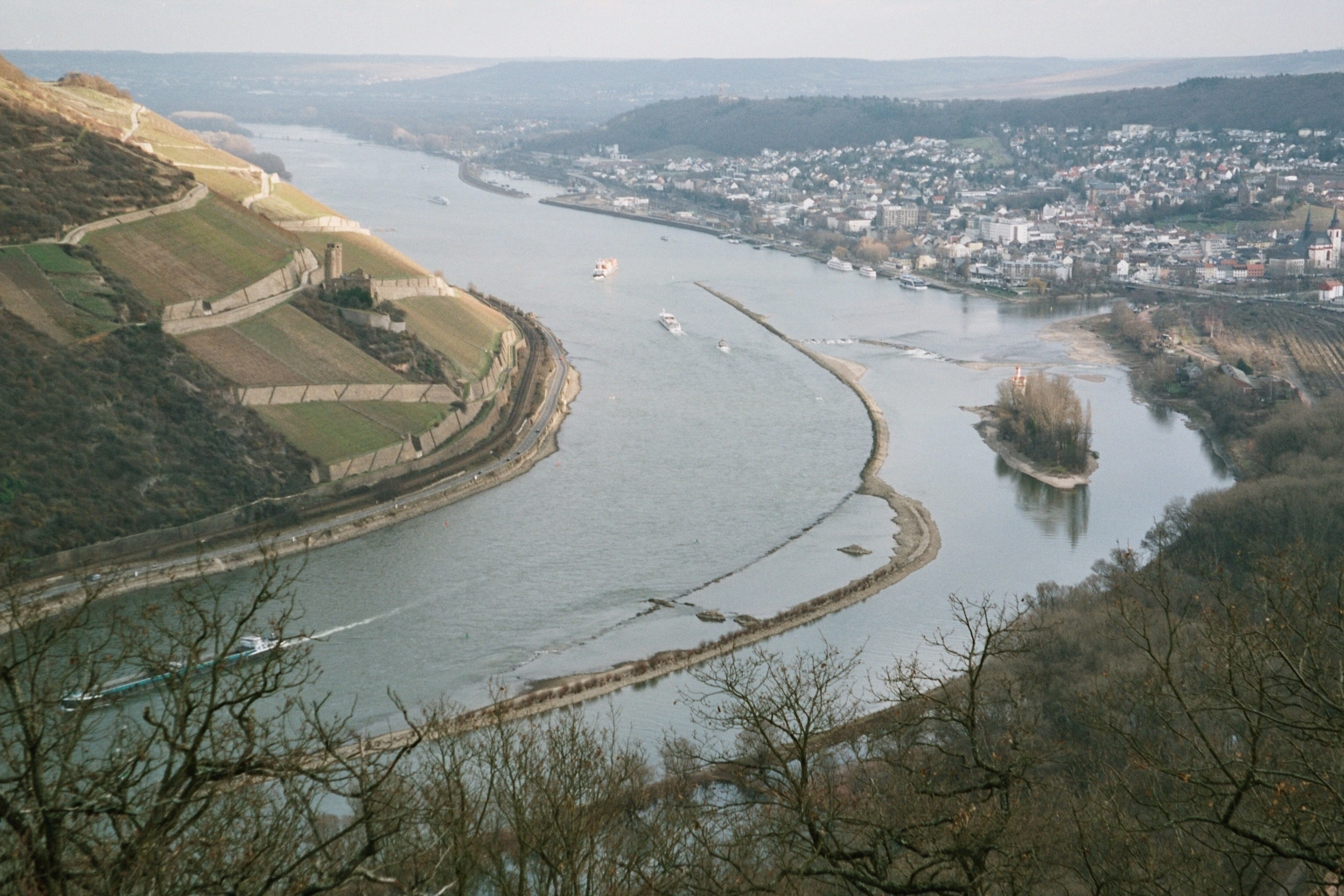
Binger Loch

Only private transport is still of importance today. The cargo harbour has been abandoned. The former winter harbour is now a marina.

There are landing stages of the tourist lines Köln-Düsseldorfer, Bingen-Rüdesheimer Fahrgastschifffahrt and Rösslerlinie. A passenger ferry and a car ferry link Bingen with Rüdesheim.

Until the late 1970s Bingen was a piloting station.

== Education ==
- University of Applied Sciences Bingen
- Stefan-George-Gymnasium
- Hildegardisschule, Bishopric of Mainz Catholic private school
- Rochus-Realschule
- Rupertus Hauptschule
- Berufsbildende Schule Bingen (vocational school)
- Bingen town library
- Folk high school

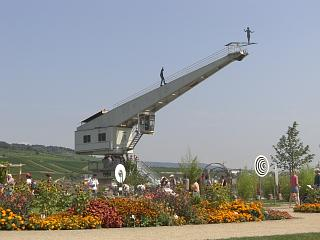
Crane as an object of art at the 2008 State Garden Show

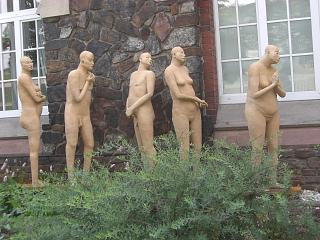
Sculptures at the 2008 State Garden Show

== Notable people ==
=== Born before 1900 ===
- Hildegard of Bingen (1098–1179), abbess and author, mystic, writer, composer, musician, and medic. After her the Bingen girls' school (Gymnasium and vocational school), the Hildegardisschule ("Higa"), is named. On 7 October 2012, Pope Benedict XVI named her a Doctor of the Church.
- Bertha of Bingen (c. 600's)
- Joseph Albrecht von Ittner (1754–1825), writer
- Philipp Foltz (1805–1877), painter
- Ferdinand Allmann (1828–1912), Mayor of Bingen and Member of the Landstände of the Grand Duchy of Hesse
- Heinrich Brück (1831–1903), Bishop of Mainz
- Johann Baptist Hilsdorf (1835–1918), photographer and father of Theodor and Jacob
- Karl Johann Brilmayer (1843–1905), Catholic priest, writer and Rhenish Hessian local historian
- Alice Bensheimer (1864–1935), politician and feminist
- Theodor Hilsdorf (1868–1944), photographer
- Stefan George (1868–1933), poet
- Carl Friedberg (1872–1955), pianist and music pedagogue
- Jacob Hilsdorf (1872–1916), photographer
- Pankraz Blank (born 1882), Member of the Landtag (Zentrum)
- Saladin Schmitt (1883–1951), theatre researcher, producer and theatre manager
- Fritz Nathan (1891–1960), leading Jewish architect who designed synagogues, department stores, and the first skyscraper in Mannheim

=== Born 1900 and later ===
- Max Richter (geologist) (1900–1983), geologist and paleontologist, professor at the Freie Universität Berlin
- August Weimer (1908–1980), trade unionist and politician (CDU), Member of the Bundestag
- Anton Philipp Brück (1913–1984), ecclesiastical historian, librarian at the Martinus-Bibliothek
- Günter Duffrer (born 1922), docent for pastoral liturgy at the Episcopal Seminary, diocesan president of church choirs in the Bishopric of Mainz
- Claire Marienfeld (born 1940), politician, former Bundestag Armed Forces Commissioner
- Mary Roos (born 1949), singer and actress
- Tina York (born 1954), singer
- Thomas Kling (1957–2005), lyric poet
- Peter Frey (born 1957), journalist
- Frank Schröder (actor) (born 1964), singer and actor
- Dajan Šimac (born 1982), footballer
- Jan Schlaudraff (born 1983), footballer and first national player from Bingen

== Twin towns – sister cities ==
Bingen am Rhein is twinned with:

- Hitchin, England, United Kingdom (1958)
- Nuits-Saint-Georges, France (1960)
- Venarey-les-Laumes, France (1967)
- Prizren, Kosovo (1968)
- Anamur, Turkey (2011)
- Kutná Hora, Czech Republic (2011)
