= Rhenish-Hessian Hills =

Coordinates: 49.7500°N 8.1200°E

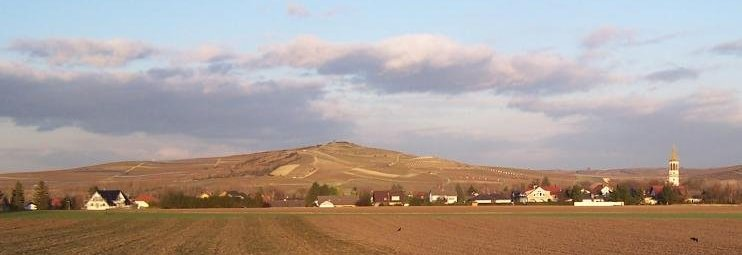
One of the four hills in Rhenish Hesse, the Petersberg

The Rhenish-Hessian Hills (German: Rheinhessisches Hügelland), also called the "Land of the Thousand Hills" (Land der 1000 Hügel), refers to that part of Rhenish Hesse within the German state of Rhineland-Palatinate. It lies within the counties of Alzey-Worms and Mainz-Bingen, and covers the same area as the natural region known as the Rhenish Hesse Tableland and Hill Country (Rheinhessisches Tafel- und Hügelland). It covers an area of around 1,400 km^{2}.

== Hills ==
The hills and spurs of the Rhenish-Hessian Hills include – with heights in metres (m) above sea level (NHN):

- Kappelberg (357.6 m), in the Vorholz woodlands between Bechenheim, Orbis and Oberwiesen near the border with the Palatinate
- Eichelberg (320.3 m), near Fürfeld
- Kloppberg (293,4 m), near Hochborn and Dittelsheim-Heßloch
- Wartberg (285.2 m), with Alzey Wartberg Tower (275,3), south of Alzey
- Jakobsberg (273.8 m), between Dromersheim, Laurenziberg and Ockenheim, with the Jakobsberg Priory
- Hornberg (273.3 m), near Framersheim
- Napoleonshöhe (271.4 m), near Sprendlingen and Zotzenheim, with subpeak Zotzenheimer Horn (247.5 m)
- Horn (271.0 m), in Rhenish-Hessian Switzerland between Siefersheim and Neu-Bamberg, with subpeak Mühlberg (248.5 m)
- Wißberg (270.2 m), between Gau-Bickelheim and Sankt Johann, with golf course
- Michaelsberg (262.2 m), northwest of Spiesheim
- Teufelsrutsch (ca. 260 m), southwest of Wendelsheim, west of Nack
- Mainzer Berg (249.1 m), southeast of Ingelheim am Rhein and east-northeast of Großwinternheim
- Auf der Muhl (247.5 m), zwischen Mainz-Ebersheim, Nieder-Olm and Zornheim
- Westerberg (247.5 m) with Ingelheim's Bismarck Tower on the Waldeck (ca. 212 m), near Ingelheim am Rhein
- Petersberg (245.6 m), between Gau-Odernheim and Bechtolsheim
- Rochusberg (244.9 m), between Bingen am Rhein and Büdesheim, with the Rochuskapelle and Emperor Frederick Tower (ca. 242 m) and Scharlachkopf (226.9 m)
- Mühlberg (242.9 m), between Mainz-Ebersheim and Nieder-Olm
- Rabenkopf (Rhenish Hesse) (200.4 m), near Wackernheim
- Selzer Berg (237.1 m), between Selzen and Sörgenloch
- Lerchenberg (max. 233,8 m), east-northeastern flank of the Mainzer Berg in Mainz with ZDF transmitter (ca. 205 m)
- Schildberg (209,8 m), near Sulzheim
