= Mouse Tower =

Tower in Germany

Coordinates: 49°58′19″N 7°52′51″E

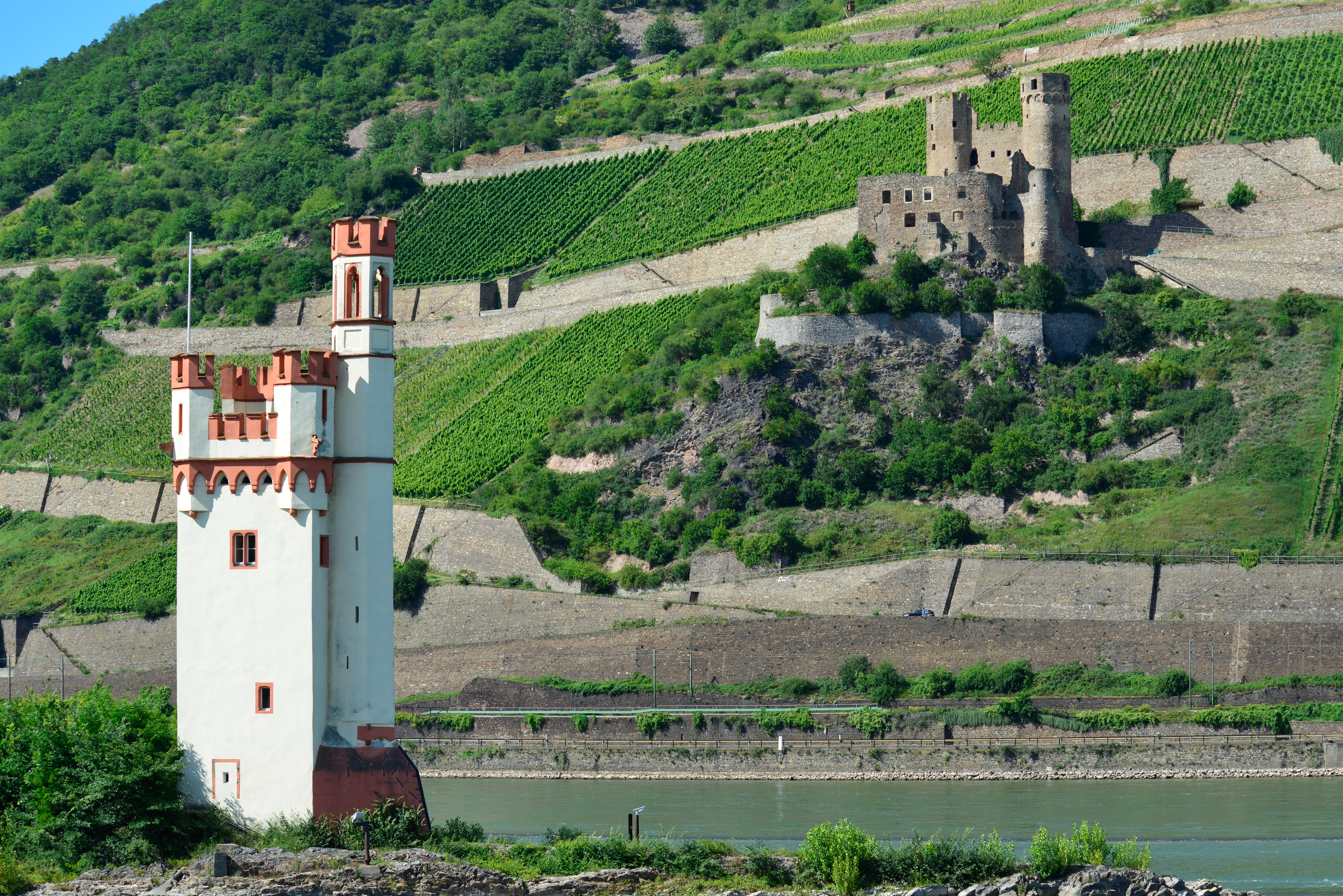
The Mouse Tower with Ehrenfels Castle on the background

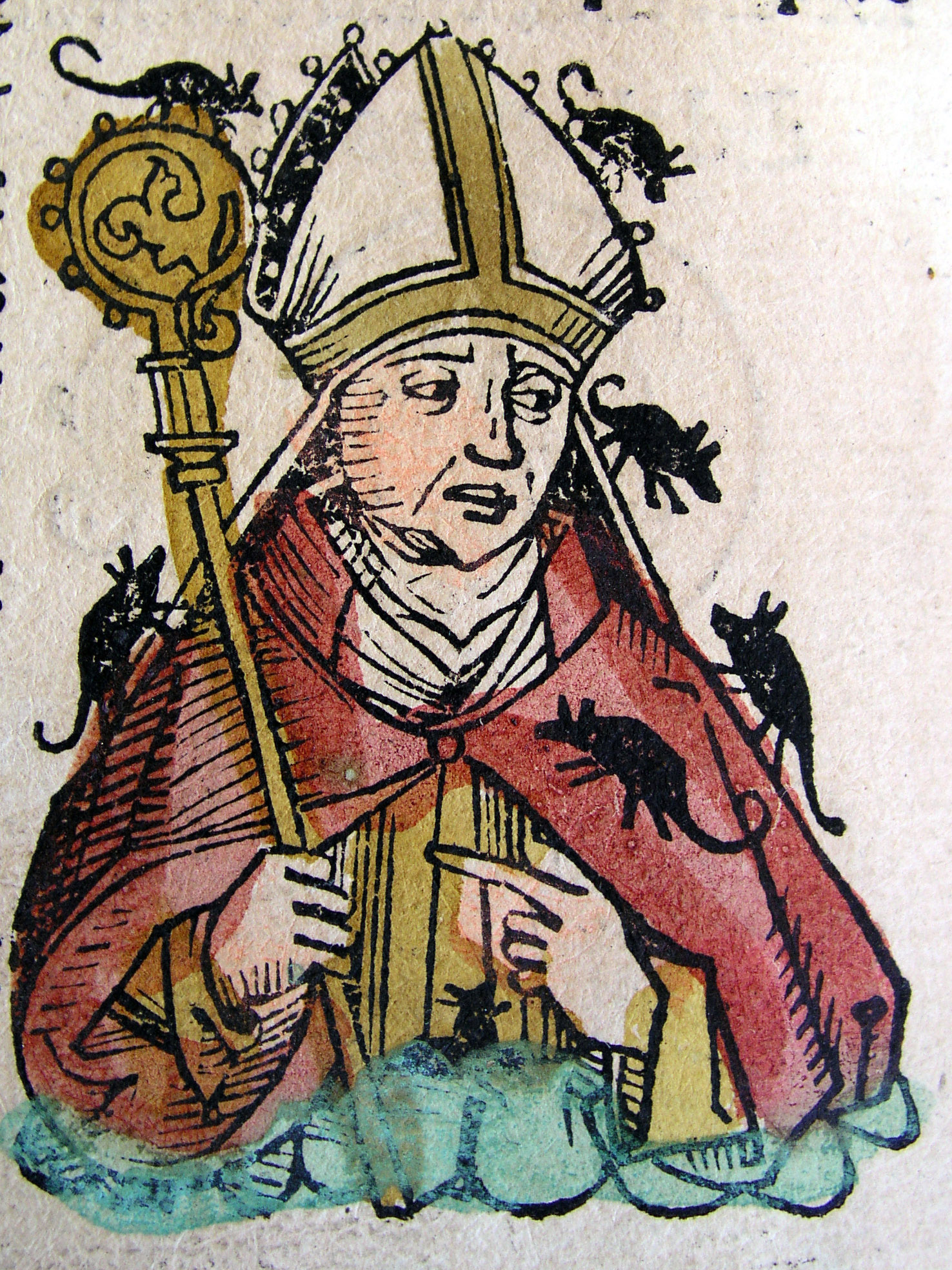
Hatto, Archbishop of Mainz. From the Nuremberg Chronicle (1493). Hatto is depicted being eaten alive by mice, as described in the Mouse Tower legend.

The Mouse Tower (German: Mäuseturm) is a stone tower on a small island in the Rhine, outside Bingen am Rhein, Germany.

== History ==
The Romans were the first to build a structure on this site. It later became part of Franconia, and it fell and had to be rebuilt many times. Hatto II, the Archbishop of Mainz, restored the tower in 968.

In 1298 the structure became an official customs collection tower. It was destroyed by a French army in 1689, then rebuilt in 1855 as a Prussian signal tower.

== Legend ==
The story of how it came to be called the "Mouse Tower" comes from a folk tale. According to this popular, but unsubstantiated, legend, Hatto II was a cruel ruler who oppressed and exploited the peasants in his domain. He used the tower as a platform for archers and crossbowmen and demanded tribute from passing ships, shooting on their crews if they did not comply. During a famine in 974 the poor had run out of food, but Hatto, having all the grain stored up in his barns, used his monopoly to sell it at such high prices that most could not afford it.

The peasants became angry and were planning to rebel, so Hatto devised a cruel trick. He promised to feed the hungry people and told them to go to an empty barn and wait for him to come with food. The peasants were overjoyed and praised Hatto heartily. They made their way to the barn to await his coming. When he arrived with his servants, he ordered the barn's doors shut and locked, then set the barn on fire and burned the peasants to death, derisively commenting on their death cries with the words "Hear the mice squeak!" (This quote exists in several slight variations.)

When Hatto returned to his castle, he was immediately besieged by an army of mice. He fled the swarm and took a boat across the river to his tower, hoping that the mice could not swim. The mice followed, pouring into the river in their thousands. Many drowned, but even more reached the island, where they ate through the tower's doors and crawled up to the top floor, where they found Hatto and ate him alive.

They have whetted their teeth against the stones,
And now they pick the bishop’s bones;
They gnawed the flesh from every limb,
For they were sent to do judgement on him!

The "Mouse Tower" story about a cruel overlord has been told about numerous rulers, this being the most famous version, although there is no historical evidence for it. The story's reference to Hatto's demand for tribute or a toll ("Maut" in German) of passing ships from the tower, as well as its later use as a customs collection tower, provide a suggested etymological origin for its name, with "Mautturm" (toll tower) eventually becoming "Mäuseturm". A previous Hatto was Hatto I Archbishop of Mainz, whose cruelty was also long remembered in Saxony.

In addition to being immortalized in the above poem by Robert Southey, an allusion to this tale can be found in "The Children's Hour" by Henry Wadsworth Longfellow:

They almost devour me with kisses,
Their arms about me entwine,
Till I think of the Bishop of Bingen
In his Mouse Tower on the Rhine!

The legend of Bishop Hatto and his Mouse Tower is also referenced in the 1812 children's novel The Swiss Family Robinson by Johann David Wyss. One of the children, Ernest, recalled the German legend (they were a German Swiss family) after coming upon a muskrat colony upon their island home.

== See also ==
- Popiel, for a similar legend about a Polish medieval duke
