= Kappelberg (Rhenish Hesse) =

Coordinates: 49°42′30″N 7°58′54″E

The Kappelberg, at 358 metres, is the highest hill in Rhenish Hesse in central Germany. It lies in the forest of Vorholz between Bechenheim, Orbis and Oberwiesen near the border with the Palatinate.

About 10 metres from the highest point is a large cairn of basalt rocks. In old illustrations the Kappelberg was also spelt Cappelberg, which presumably indicates that there may have been an old chapel at this site.

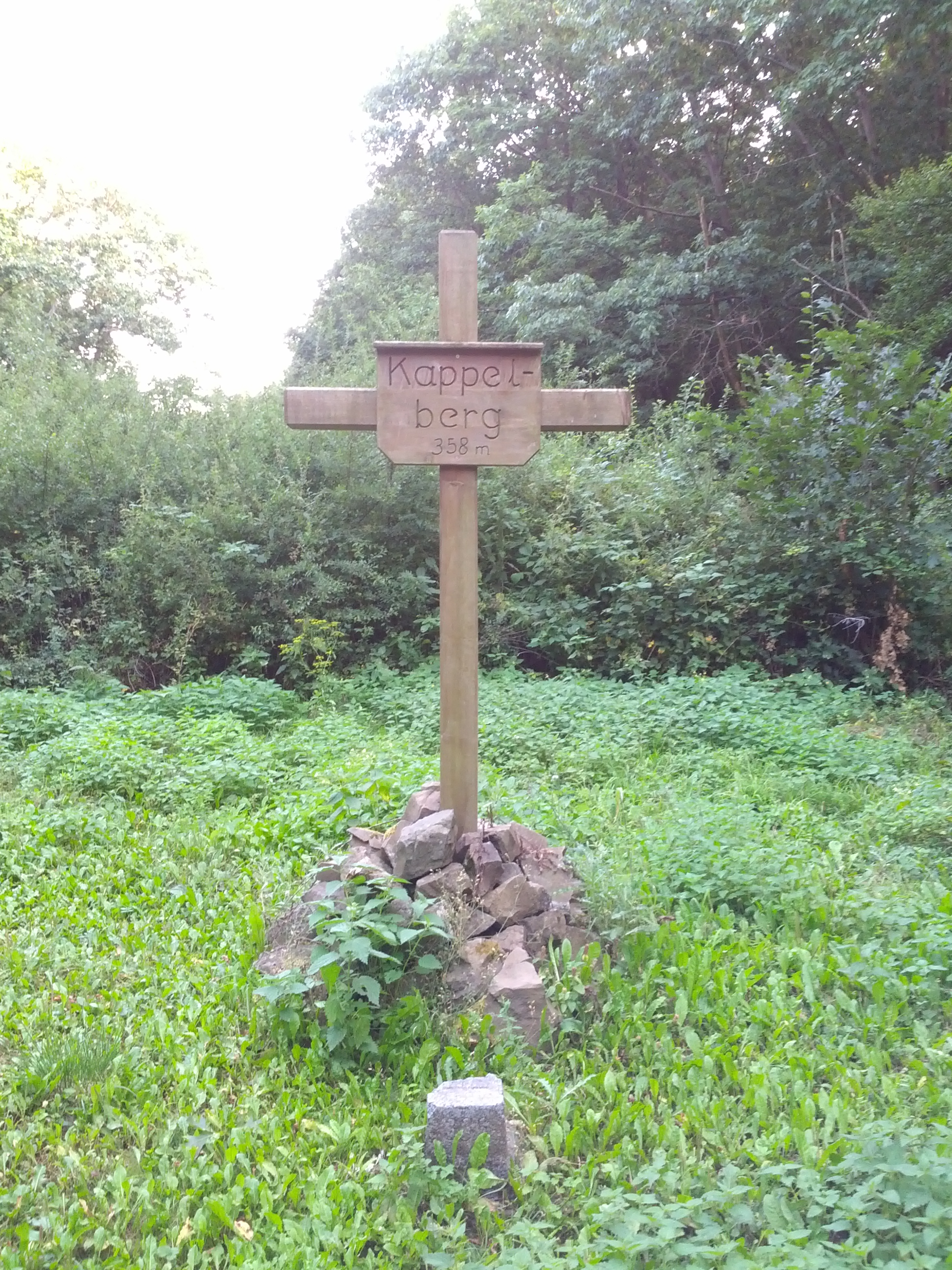
Summit cross on the Kappelberg in Rhenish Hesse

A community of interest from the participating villages was founded in May 2008 and the highest point in Rhenish Hesse, which was buried under thick undergrowth, was made accessible and signposted. In March 2009 a summit cross was erected at the top.

== See also ==
- Rhenish-Hessian Hills
