= Basilica of St. Martin =

Basilica of St. Martin may refer to:

- Basilica of Saint Martin, Tours, a Roman Catholic basilica in Tours, France
- Basilica of Saint-Martin d'Ainay, a Romanesque church in Lyon, France
- Taal Basilica, the Minor Basilica of Saint Martin of Tours, in Batangas, Philippines
- Basilica of St. Martin, Bingen am Rhein, a Catholic church in Rhineland-Palatinate, Germany
- Basilica of St. Martin, Weingarten, neighboring Weingarten Abbey, near Ravensburg, Baden-Württemberg, Germany
