= Peter Frey (journalist) =

German television presenter, journalist and radio host

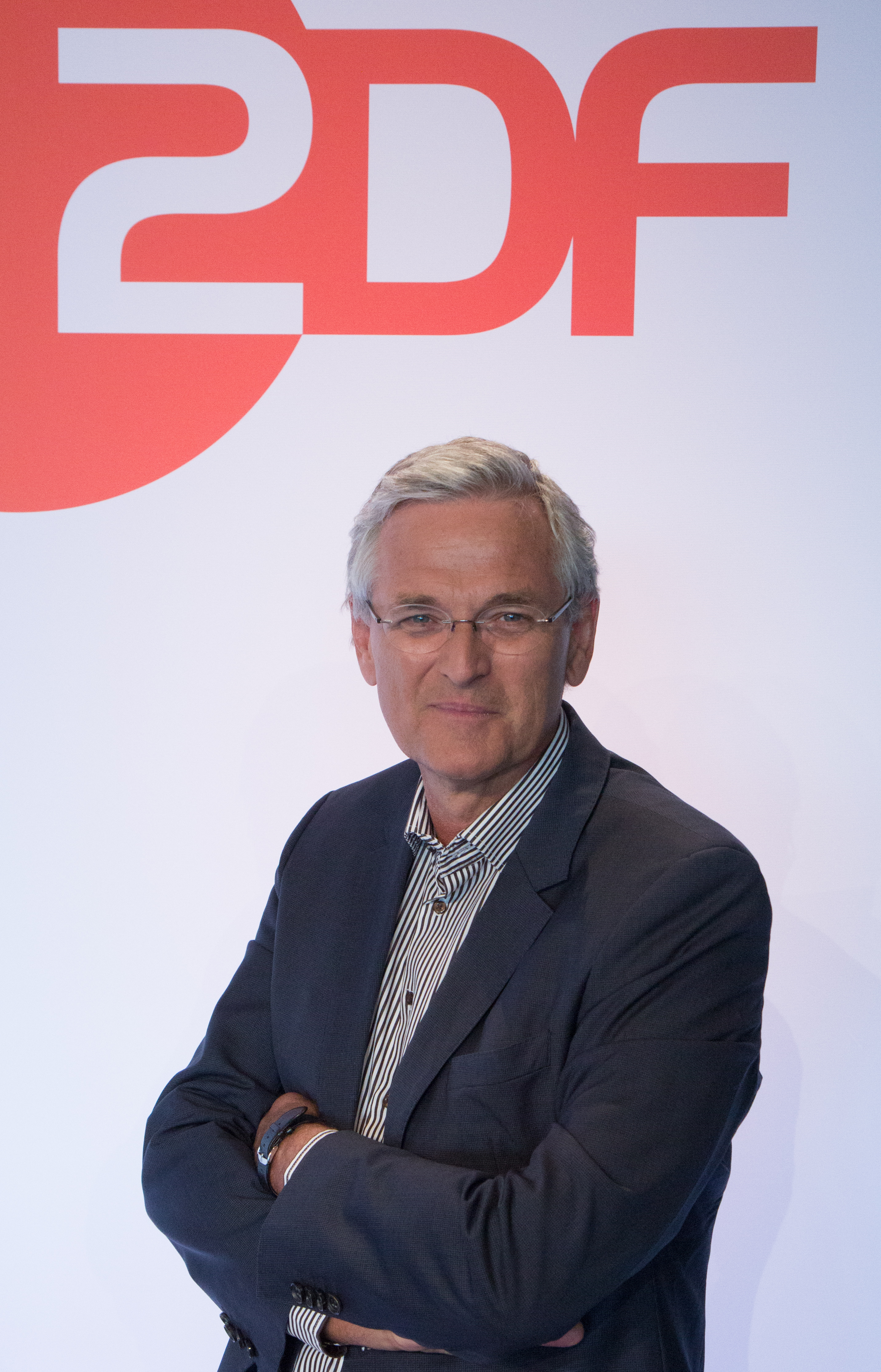
- Frey in 2018
- Born: 4 August 1957 (age 69); Bingen am Rhein, Rhineland-Palatinate, Germany
- Occupation: Journalist
- Employer: ZDF

Peter Frey (born 4 August 1957) is a German journalist. He was editor-in-chief of ZDF from 1 April 2010 to September 2022.

== Early life and education ==
Frey was born on 4 August 1957 in Bingen am Rhein, Germany. After graduating from the Stefan-George-Gymnasium in Bingen in 1976, Frey performed community service and from 1978 studied political science, education and Spanish at the University of Mainz and as a scholarship holder of the Spanish Foreign Ministry in Madrid.

== Journalism career ==
During his studies, he worked as a presenter for Südwestfunk and wrote for the Frankfurter Rundschau and Die Zeit. In 1983, he became an editor at ZDF and reported from Mexico, Nicaragua, Spain, and Poland. From 1988, he was the personal advisor to the then newly-elected ZDF editor-in-chief Klaus Bresser.

In 1991, Frey went to Washington, D.C. as a correspondent and deputy head of the ZDF studio there, where he reported on the Gulf War. From 1992 to 1998, he headed the ZDF-Morgenmagazin and moderated the program together with Maybrit Illner, Gundula Gause, and Cherno Jobatey.

From 1998 to 2001, he was the head of ZDF's main foreign affairs department. During this time he presented the auslandsjournal, numerous special programs, and the program ZDF Royal. He developed the daily journal heute – in Europa and authored the foreign reports Wer rettet Russland? and Der Fluch des Öls.

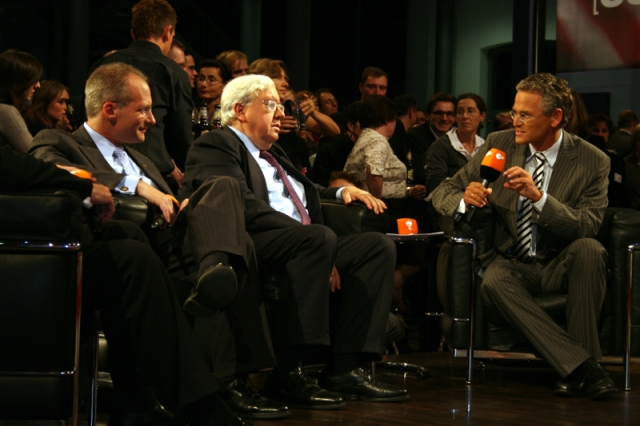
Peter Frey (right) in an interview with chargé d'affaires John M. Koenig (left) and former Ambassador John Kornblum (center), 2008

From 2001 to 2010, Frey was head of the ZDF capital studio in Berlin and presented the programs Berlin direkt, ZDF-Sommerinterview, and Berliner Runde. He analyzed current political developments for the news programs heute and heute-journal.

In 2005, he hosted numerous special episodes on the death of Pope John Paul II and the election of Pope Benedict XVI from Rome. In 2008, he hosted the nine-hour program Amerika hat gewählt zur Wahl von Barack Obama and commented on Obama's visits to Germany.

On 10 December 2009, he was elected by the ZDF board of directors to succeed Nikolaus Brender as the new ZDF editor-in-chief from 1 April 2010. His successor as head of the Berlin studio was Bettina Schausten.

As editor-in-chief, he introduced the new series ZDFzoom and ZDFzeit, and was committed to the development of the digital channel ZDFinfo and the broadcaster's online strategy. He is still present on the screen as a commentator of heute-journal. Since Peter Frey's election as editor-in-chief, Shakuntala Banerjee, Sophie Burkhardt, Benjamin Daniel, Frederic Huwendiek, and Miriam Steimer have served as program speakers for him.

Peter Frey is not a member of any political party. In journalistic circles, he is, like his predecessor Brender, close to the Social Democratic Party.

As an author, speaker and panelist, Peter Frey has commented on the topics of international relations, European integration, German domestic politics, German culture of remembrance and professional ethical questions in journalism and the development prospects of television.

He has expressed his positions on questions of credibility in journalism in articles for Die Zeit, the Süddeutsche Zeitung, and the Frankfurter Allgemeine Zeitung.

== Other engagement ==
Frey has been a fellow at the Center for Applied Political Research at LMU Munich since 2006. In addition, Peter Frey is a member of the advisory board of the American Jewish Committee, an elected member of the Central Committee of German Catholics, and the Deputy Chairman of the Board of Trustees of the Körber Foundation.

Frey was on the advisory board of the Federal Academy for Security Policy. He published the essay "Die Rolle der Medien in internationalen Konflikten" In this essay, Frey criticizes the "controlled reporting" of the media and the instrumentalization of journalists for political purposes.

== Personal life ==
Peter Frey is married and has one daughter. He is a Roman Catholic.

== Bibliography ==
- Spanien und Europa : die spanischen Intellektuellen und die europäische Integration (in German). Bonn: Europa Union Verlag. 1988. ISBN 3-7713-0338-9. OCLC 21045463.
- Frey, Peter (2009). 77 Wertsachen was gilt heute?. Freiburg, Br. ISBN 978-3-451-06109-7. OCLC 362799479.
- Von Bagdad nach St. Petersburg : mein Reisetagebuch (in German). Hamburg: Hoffmann und Campe. 2002. ISBN 3-455-09357-4. OCLC 50598511.
- Die Rolle der Medien in internationalen Konflikten In: Bundesakademie für Sicherheitspolitik (2001). Sicherheitspolitik in neuen Dimensionen : Kompendium zum erweiterten Sicherheitsbegriff (in German). Hamburg: Mittler. ISBN 3-8132-0776-5. OCLC 57613606. p. 903–912
- Politische Themen erfolgreich im Fernsehen vermitteln, aber wie? In: Mast, Claudia; Herbert von Halem Verlag (2018). ABC des Journalismus ein Handbuch (in German). Köln. ISBN 978-3-7445-0821-6. OCLC 982380319.
