= Chapel of St. Roch, Bingen =

German pilgrimage chapel

Coordinates: 49°57′59″N 7°55′34″E

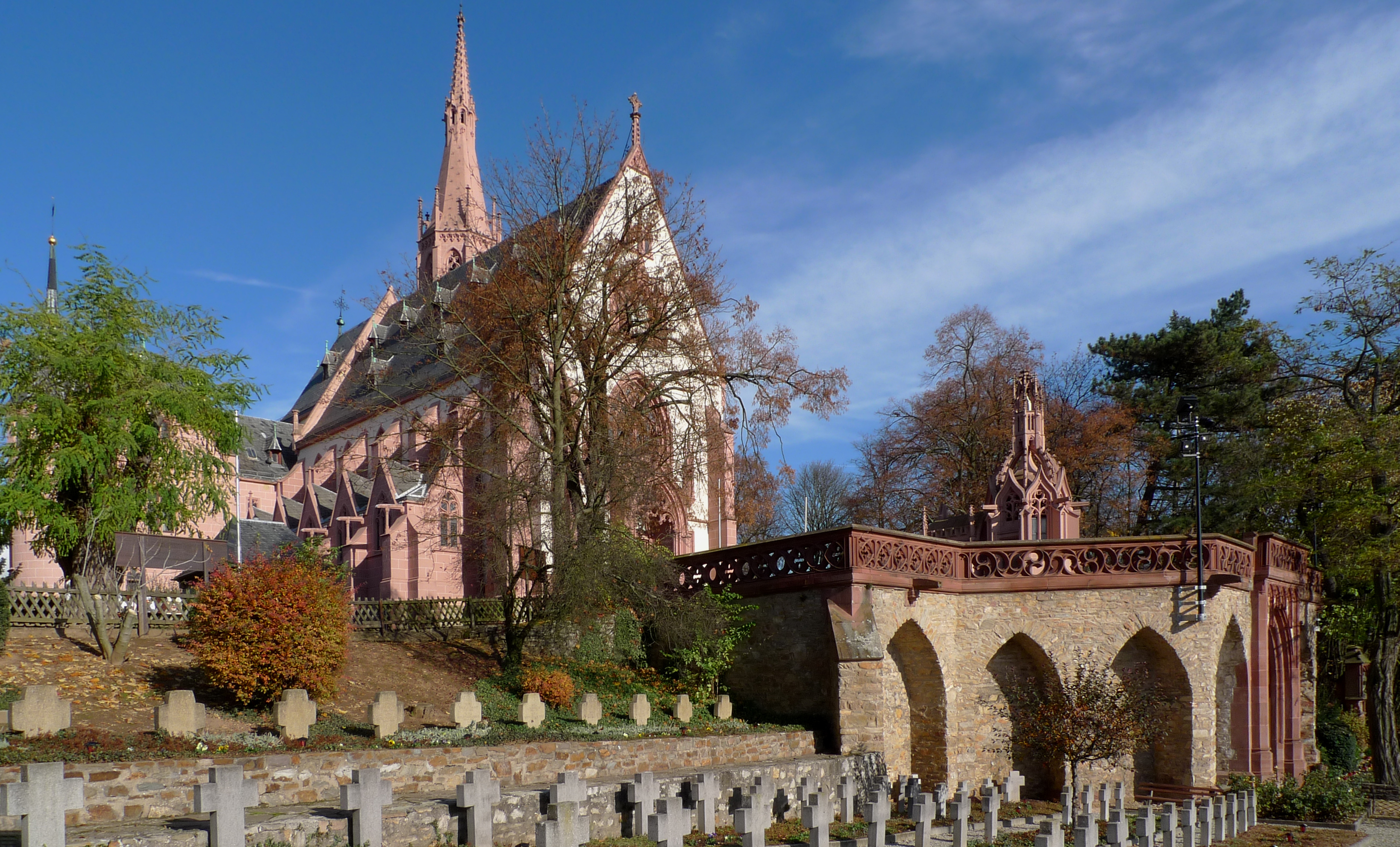
The Chapel of St. Roch and the Bethlehem Chapel

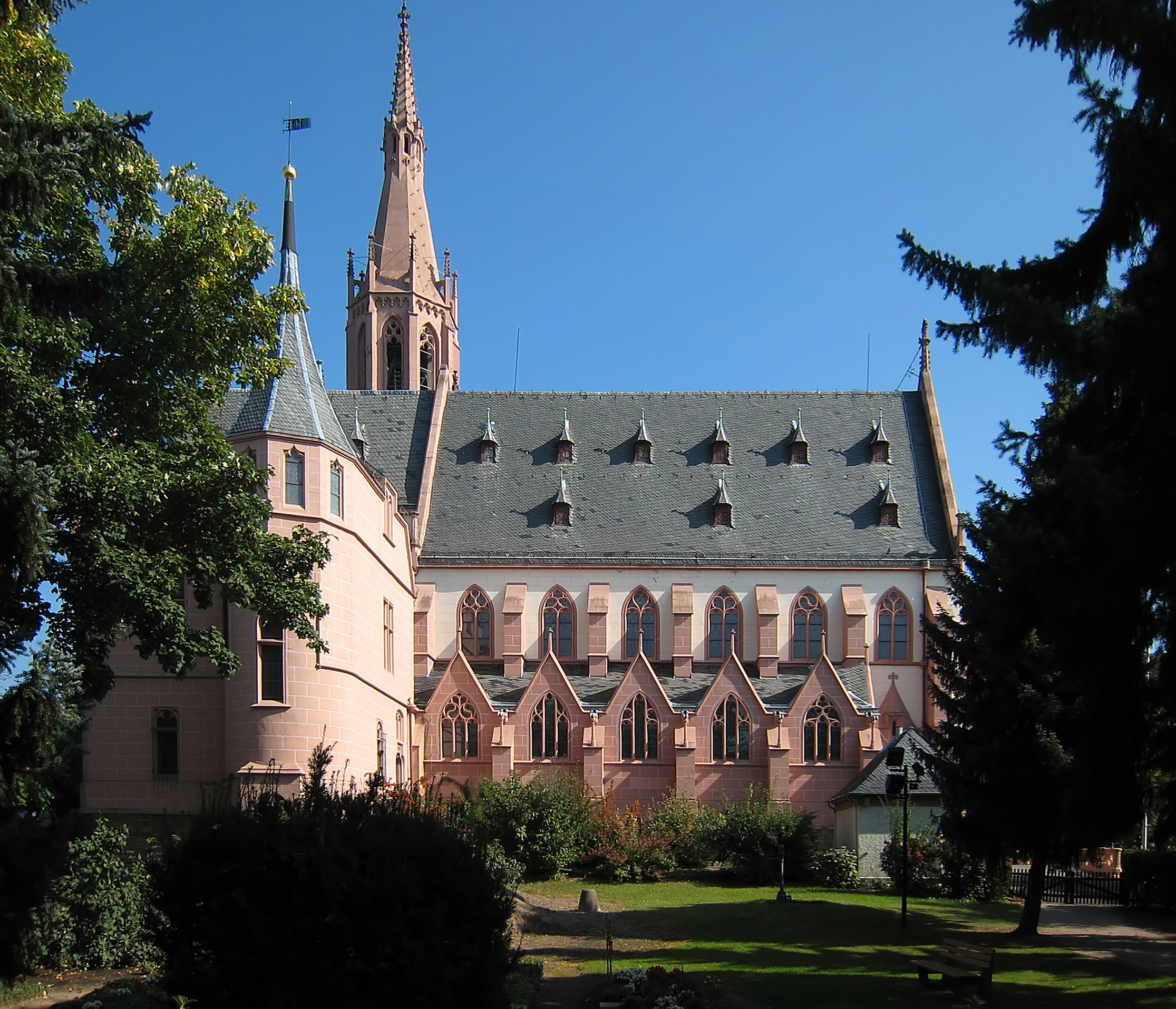
West side of the chapel

The Chapel of St. Roch (German: Rochuskapelle) is a German pilgrimage chapel, dedicated to Saint Roch, located on the Rochusberg southeast of Bingen am Rhein.

== History ==
The first building, dating to the plague year of 1666, was destroyed during the campaigns of 1795 in the French Revolutionary Wars of the Rhine valley. The second was built 1814 in the wake of a typhoid fever epidemic brought by soldiers returning from the Battle of Leipzig of the Napoleonic Wars. Goethe wrote a description of its dedication ceremony. This building's flèche was hit by lightning in 1889 and the chapel burned down to the brickwork.

The present building, built in 1893–95, has Neo Gothic designs by the Freiburg master builder Max Meckel and the Berlin stonecutters, Zeidler & Wimmel. At this time a small Bethlehem Chapel was built under the main chapel's east window, recalling an earlier chapel of that name on the site from the Crusader era.

Parts of the earlier Roch chapels' art collections survive, but the only thing to survive the 1889 fire was the Baroque statue of the patron saint at the high altar.

In the 19th century, the chapel became associated with the veneration of Hildegard of Bingen, whose relics were partially moved there after disruptions to her original burial site in nearby Eibingen during wars and chapel destructions. The altar contains relics of Hildegard, making it a pilgrimage site linked to her legacy
