= Teufelsrutsch =

Mountain in Germany

Coordinates: 49°44′54″N 7°58′45″E

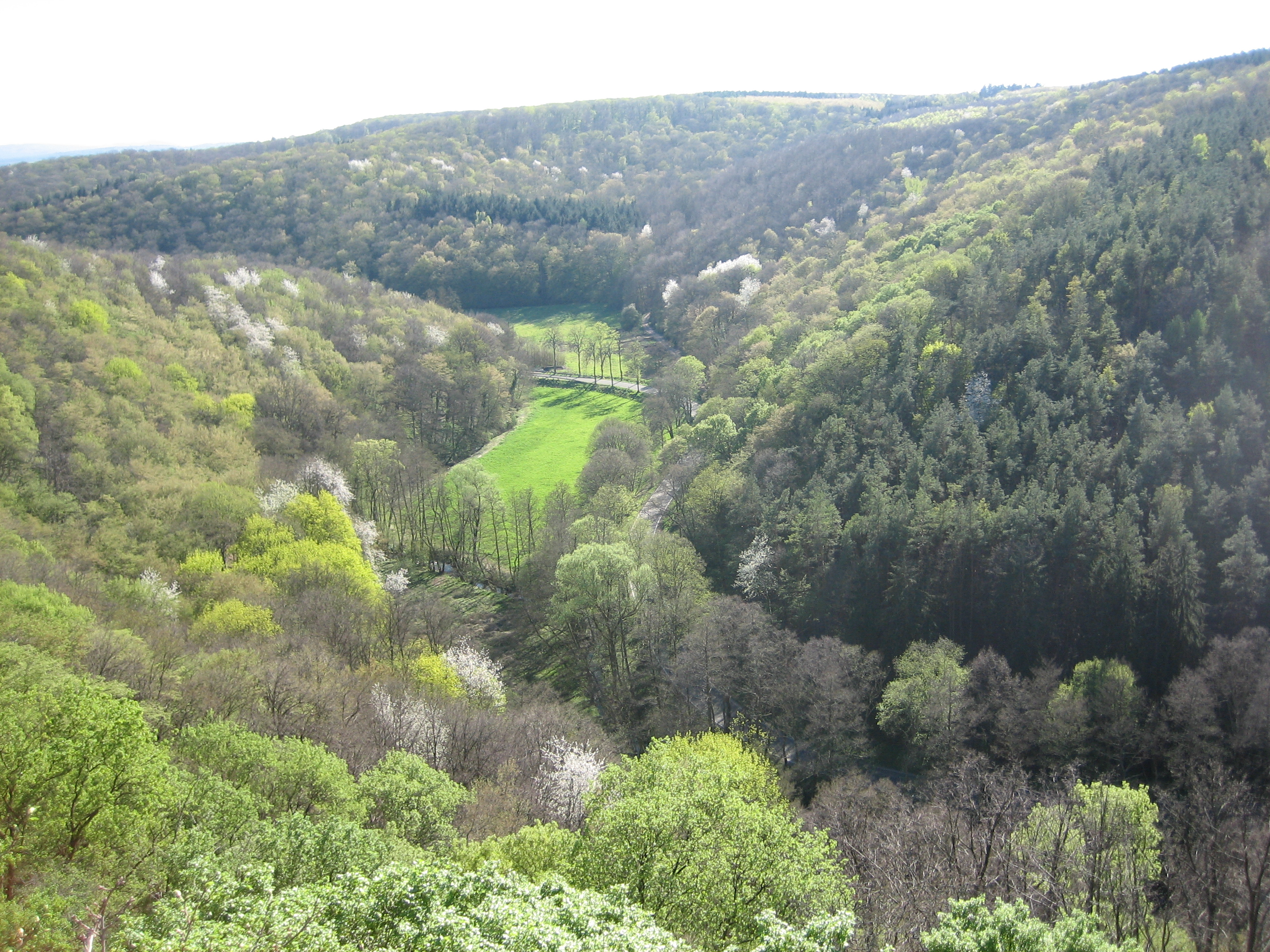
View from the Teufelsrutsch rock into the Wiesbach valley (westwards)

Die Teufelsrutsch ("Devil's Slide") is a densely wooded porphyry knoll in Rhenish Hesse, Germany. It is a popular place for excursions with wonderful views over the Wiesbach valley. The name "Devil's Slide" was inspired by a local tale, according to which the residents of Wendelsheim (a nearby village) once tricked the devil into sliding down the stony slope on his bare bottom. Thereafter he was never seen again.

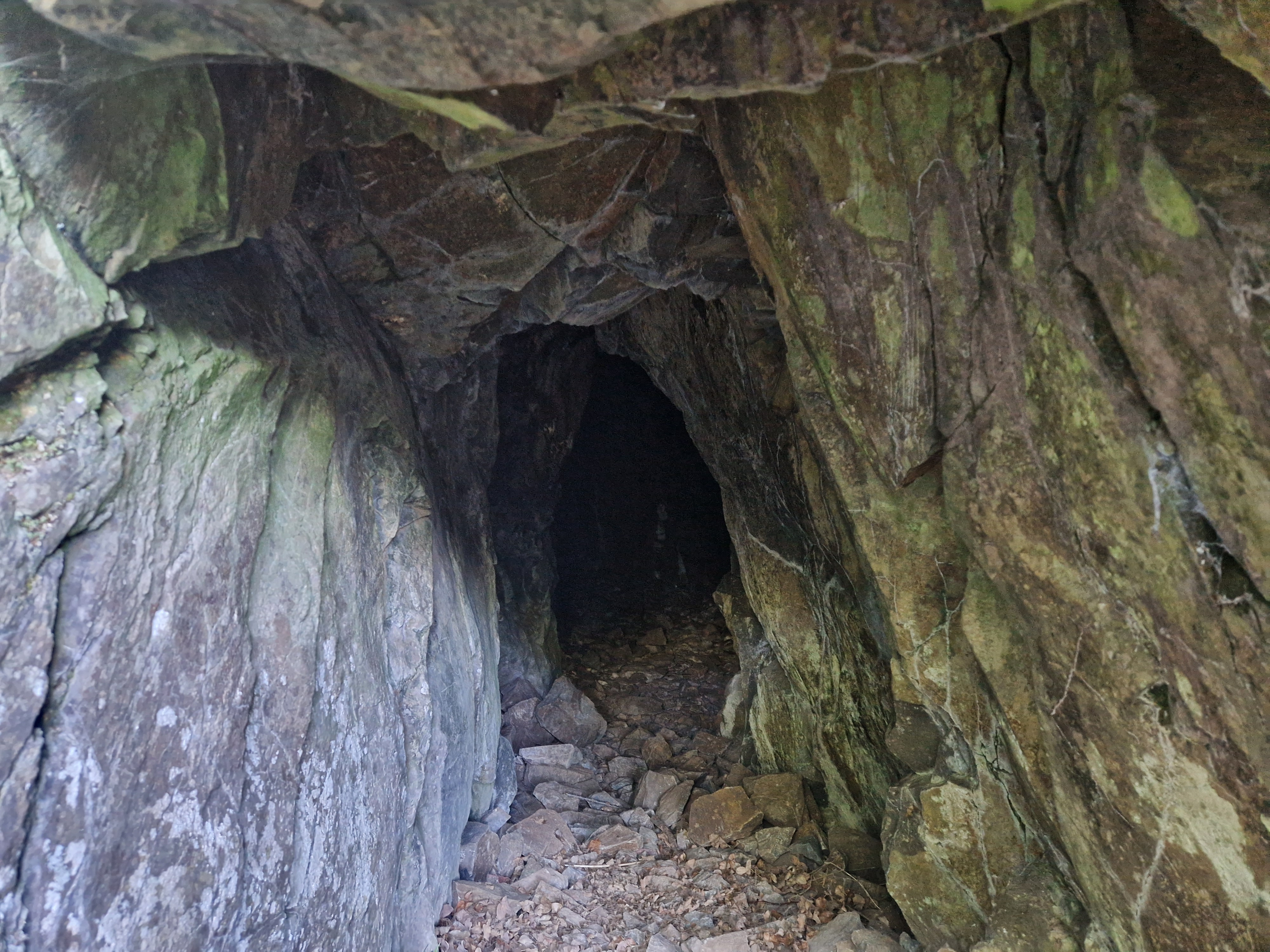
Cave entrance

Nearby, the remains of a Celtic stronghold have been found. About 20 m below the viewing platform is an accessible gallery, called Schinderhannes Cave. This 60 m-deep ancient cinnabar mine was in use from the 14th century until 1790. Ostensibly it was occupied at times by the famous outlaw and thief Johannes Bückler (nicknamed "Schinderhannes") and his comrades.

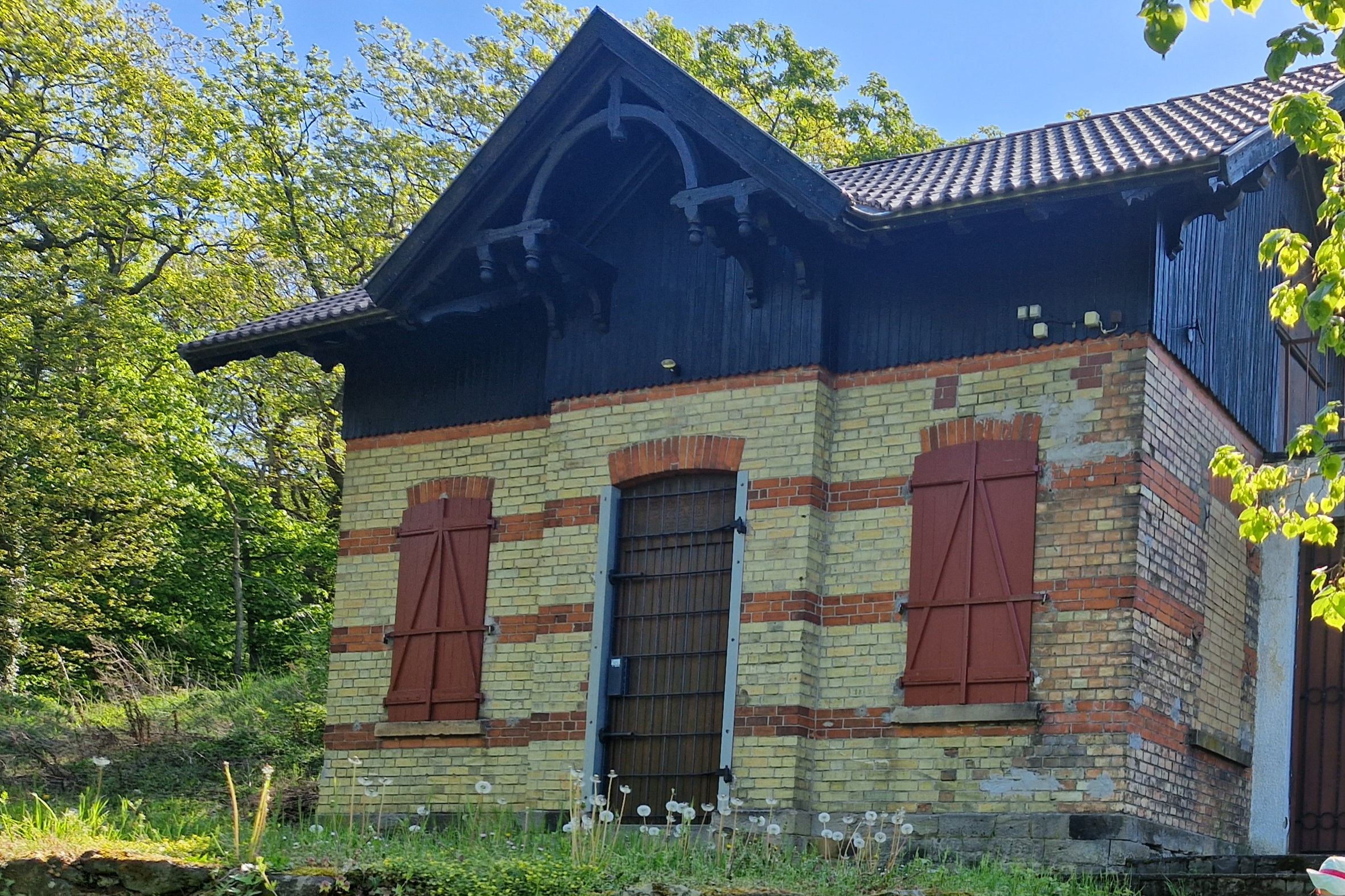
Schweizerhaus 2026

In 1885, a cabin ("Schweizerhaus") was erected at the top of Teufelsrutsch in order to accommodate the growing number of tourists.

Teufelsrutsch is also an internationally known deposit of amethyst and other minerals.

== See also ==
- Rhenish-Hessian Hills
