= Basilica of St. Martin, Bingen am Rhein =

Coordinates: 49°58′00″N 7°53′32″E

Basilica of St. Martin
- Basilika Sankt Martin
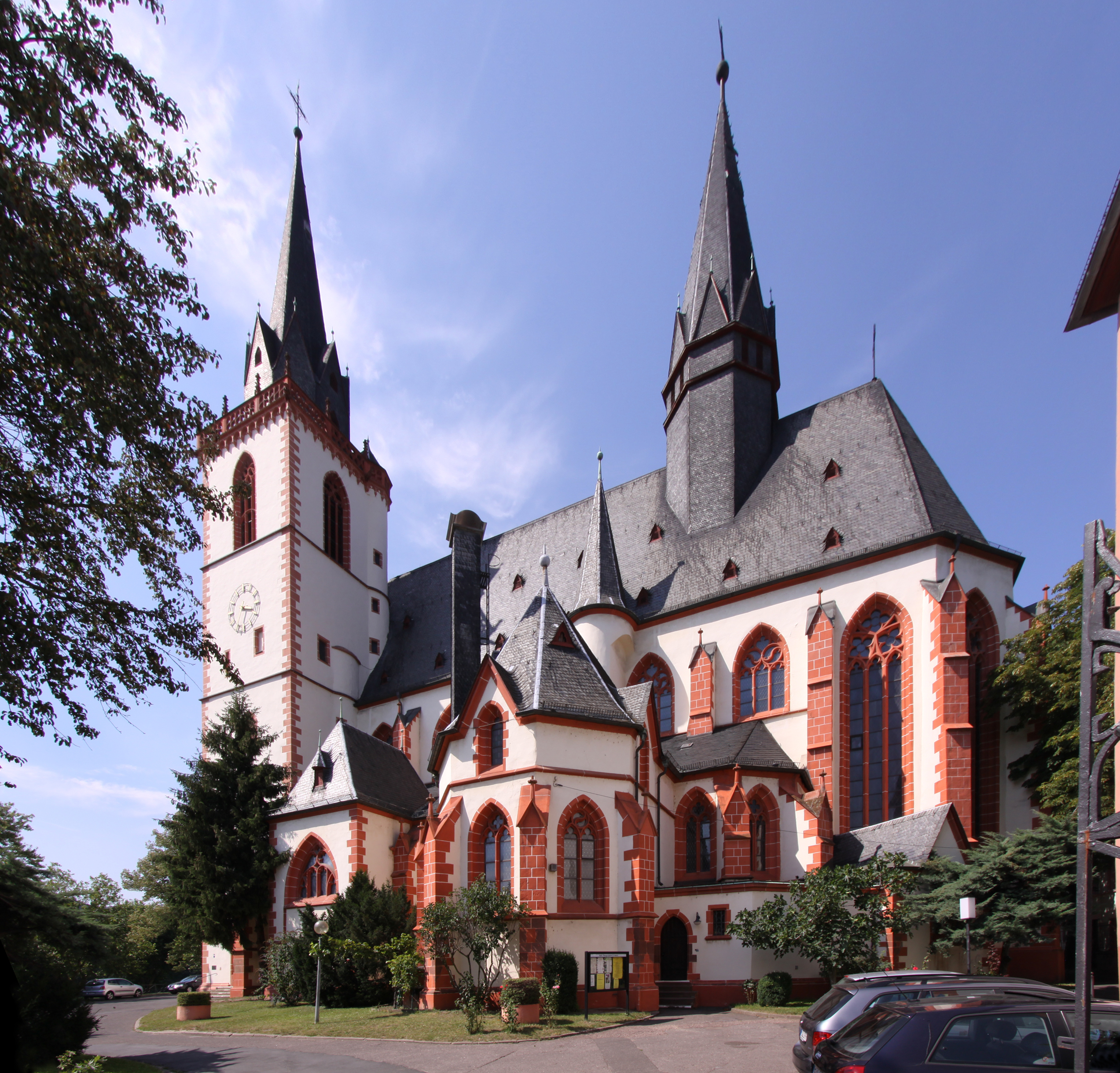

- Location within Rhineland-Palatinate Location within Germany
- Location: Bingen am Rhein
- Country: Germany
- Denomination: Roman Catholic Church

The Basilica of St. Martin (German: Basilika Sankt Martin ) also called Bingen am Rhein Basilica Is the main Catholic church of the city of Bingen am Rhein, in Rhineland-Palatinate in Germany.

The church is located on the bank of the Nahe. It was restored and renovated several times, so it is a fusion of different styles. Around 793 the crypt was built, one of the oldest crypts of Austrasia.

The church is dedicated to St. Martin of Tours, who is depicted above the main entrance and in many frescoes and the altarpiece.

In 1416 the church was enlarged and remodeled in the Lombard Gothic style; in 1505 it was beautified with works of art.

The church has been a minor basilica since 1930.

== See also ==
- Roman Catholicism in Germany
- Basilica of St. Martin (disambiguation)

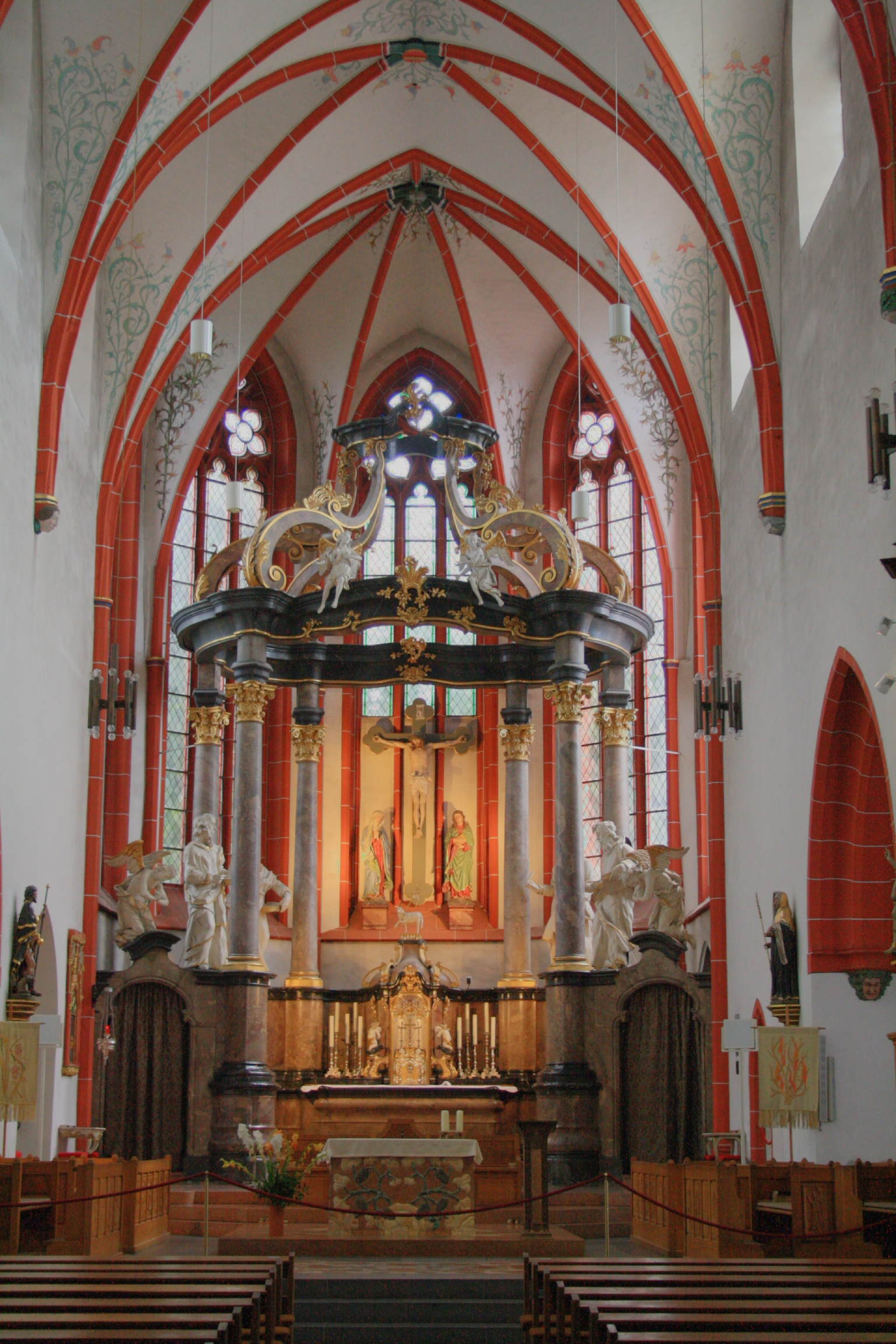
Internal view
