= Hatto II =

10th-century archbishop of Mainz

Hatto
- Archbishop of Mainz
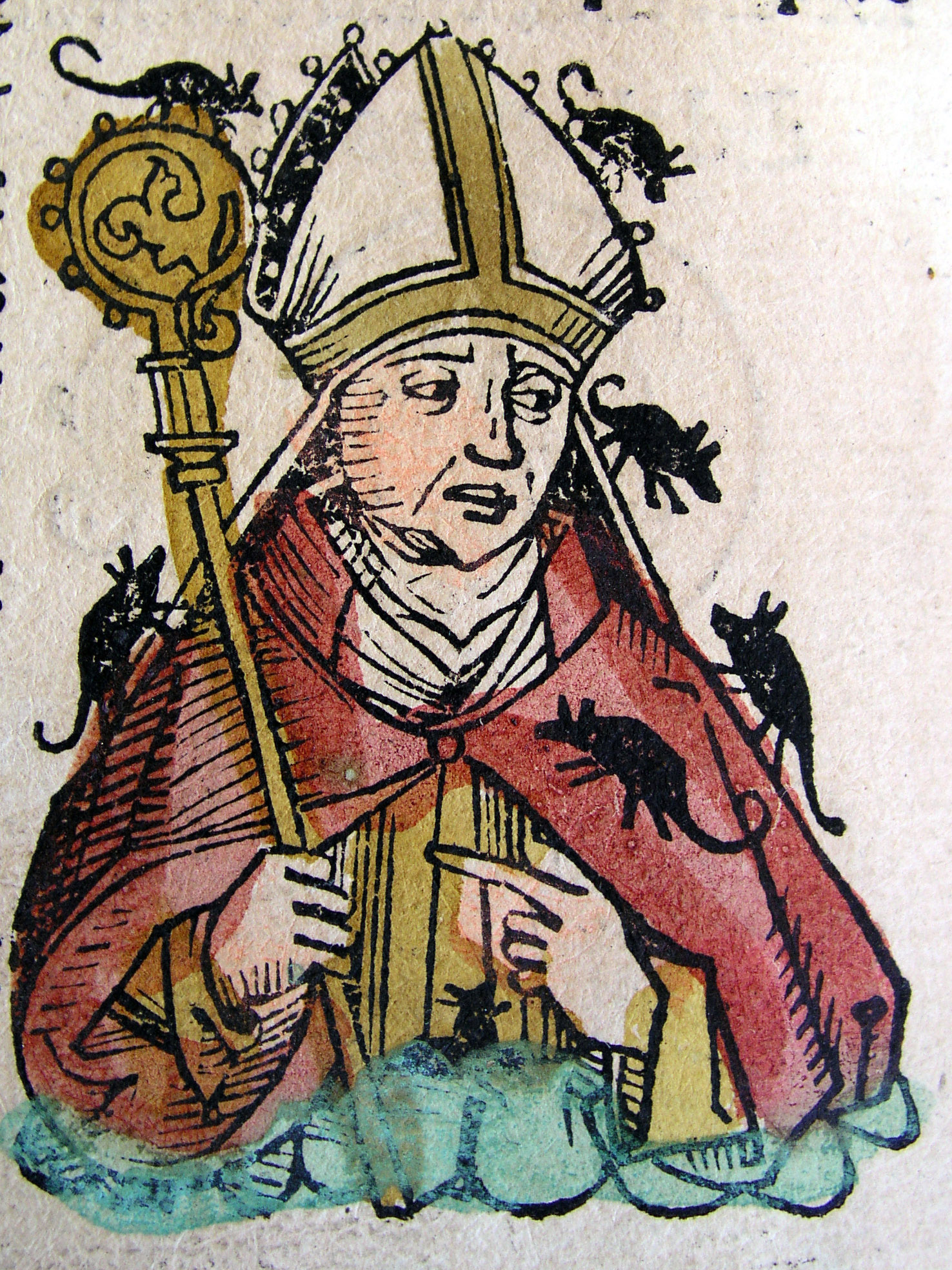
- Church: Catholic Church
- Diocese: Electorate of Mainz
- In office: 968–970

Personal details
- Died: 18 January 970

Hatto II (died on 18 January 970) was the archbishop of Mainz from 968 to 970.

While in office, he built the church of St. George on the island of Reichenau, donated heavily to the abbeys of Fulda and Reichenau, and was a patron of the chronicler Regino of Prüm.

A well-known folk tale describes Hatto as a cruel and oppressive ruler who was finally punished by being eaten alive by mice - an event which supposedly happened in the Mouse Tower (see details on that page). There is, however, no indication of the tale being historically true, and similar tales were attached to various other rulers as well, such as the Count of Wörthschlössl Castle in Bavaria.

The story's reference to Hatto's demand for tribute or a toll ("Maut" in German) of ships passing the tower, as well as its later use as a customs collection tower, provide a suggested etymological origin for its name, with "Mautturm" (toll tower) eventually becoming "Mäuseturm".

== See also ==
- Mouse Tower - legend about the cruelty of Hatto II.
- Popiel, for a similar legend

Preceded by William	Archbishop of Mainz; 968–970	Succeeded by Rudbrecht
