= Devil's Slide (Montana) =

Mountain in Montana, United States

Devils Slide
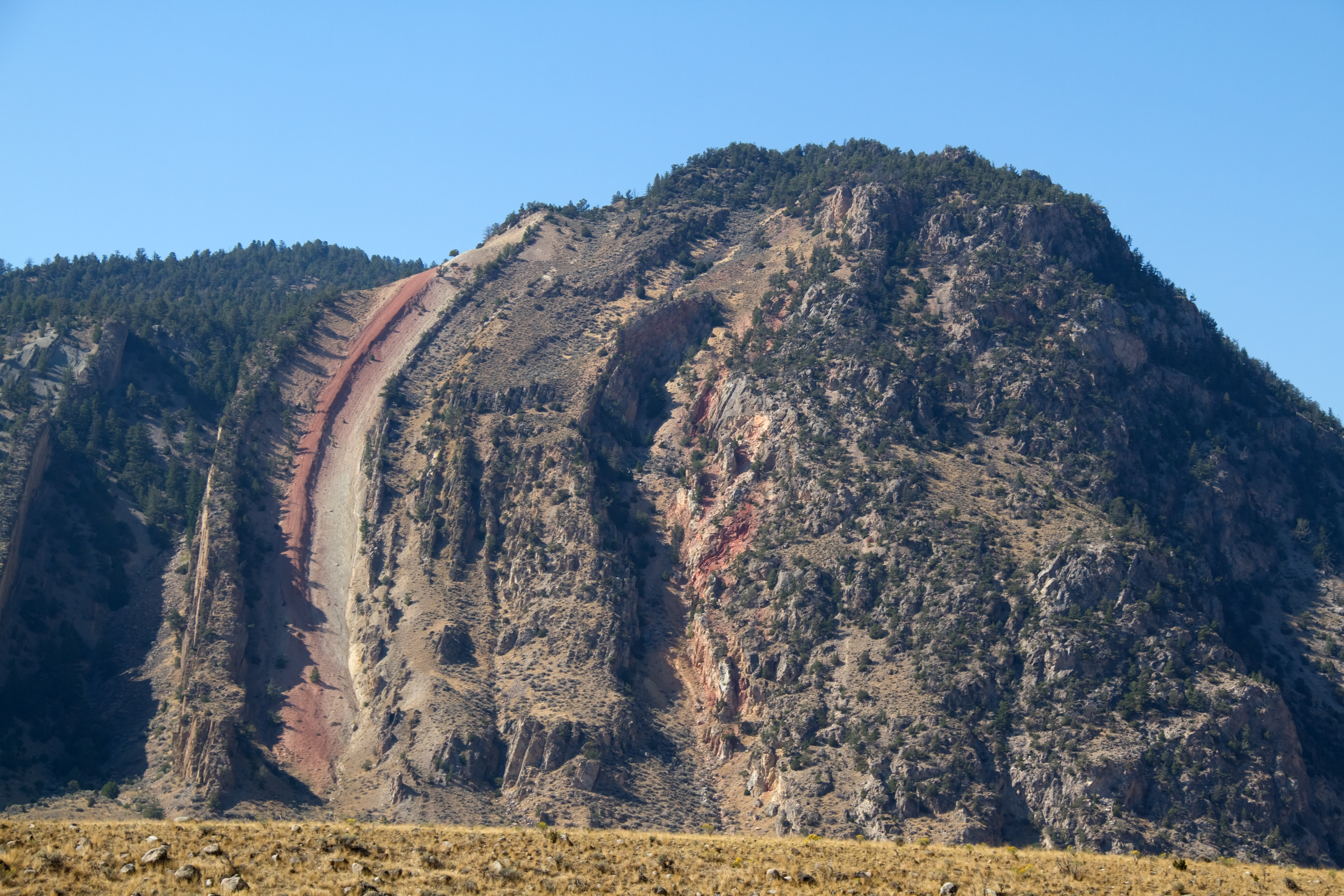
- Devils Slide in 2012

Highest point
- Elevation: 6,499 ft (1,981 m)
- Parent peak: Cinnabar Mountain
- Coordinates: 45°05′32″N 110°47′59″W

Geography
- Location within Montana
- Location: South of Yankee Jim Canyon, Cinnabar Mountain, Yellowstone River, Park County, Montana
- Parent range: Gallatin Range
- Topo map: Electric Peak

Devil's Slide is an unusual cliff rock formation on the side of Cinnabar Mountain located in Gallatin National Forest in Park County, Montana, north of Yellowstone National Park. This distinctive formation can be viewed from Highway 89 and was created from alternate beds of limestone, sandstone, quartzites that have been tilted to lie nearly vertical and have eroded at different rates.

== History ==
In 1871, very few white travellers had ventured this far south in the Yellowstone River valley. The Cook–Folsom–Peterson Expedition passed the Devil's Slide in 1869. Cook and Folsom described the slide in their diaries but did not name them

In August 1870, the Washburn–Langford–Doane Expedition observed the formation and named it The Devil's Slide. Langford described the formation in his Wonders of the Yellowstone published in the May 1871 edition of Scribner's Monthly:

Here an object met our attention which deserves more than a casual notice. It was two parallel vertical walls of rock, projecting from the side of a mountain to the height of 125 feet, traveling the mountain from base to summit, a distance of 1,500 feet. These walls were not to exceed thirty feet in width, and their tops for the whole length were crowned with a growth of pines. The sides were as even as if they had been worked by line and plumb-the whole space between, and on either side of them, having been completely: eroded and washed away. We had seen many of the capricious works wrought by erosion upon the friable rocks of Montana, but never before upon so majestic a scale. Here an entire mountainside, by wind and water, had been removed, leaving as the evidences of their protracted toil these vertical projections, which, but for their immensity, might as readily be mistaken for works of art as of nature. Their smooth sides, uniform width and height, and great length, considered in connection with the causes which had wrought their insulation, excited our wonder and admiration. They were all the more curious because of their dissimilarity to any other striking objects in natural scenery that we had ever seen or heard of. In future years, when the wonders of the Yellowstone are incorporated into the family of fashionable resorts, there will be few of its attractions surpassing in interest this marvelous freak of the elements. For some reason, best understood by himself, one of our companions gave to these rocks the name of the "Devil's Slide." The suggestion was unfortunate, as, with more reason perhaps, but with no better taste, we frequently had occasion to appropriate other portions of the person of his Satanic Majesty, or of his dominion, in signification of the varied marvels we met with.

— Nathaniel P. Langford, Wonders of the Yellowstone, 1871

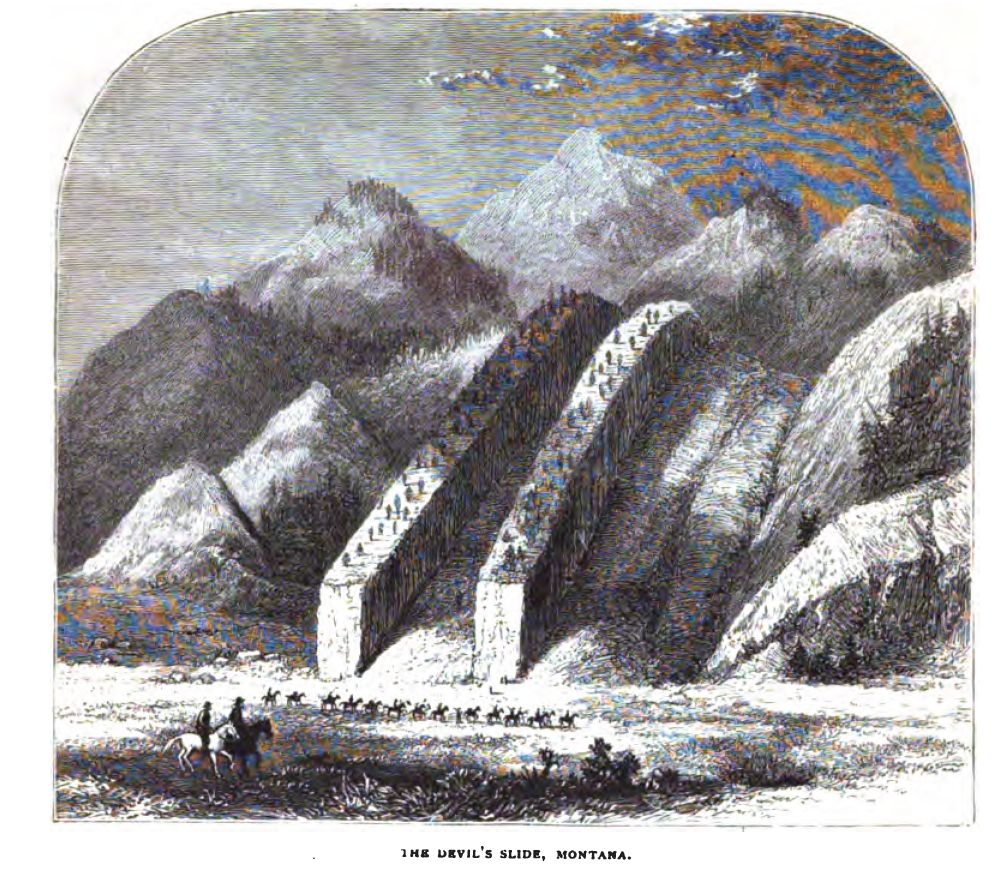
1871 illustration of Devil's Slide by Thomas Moran

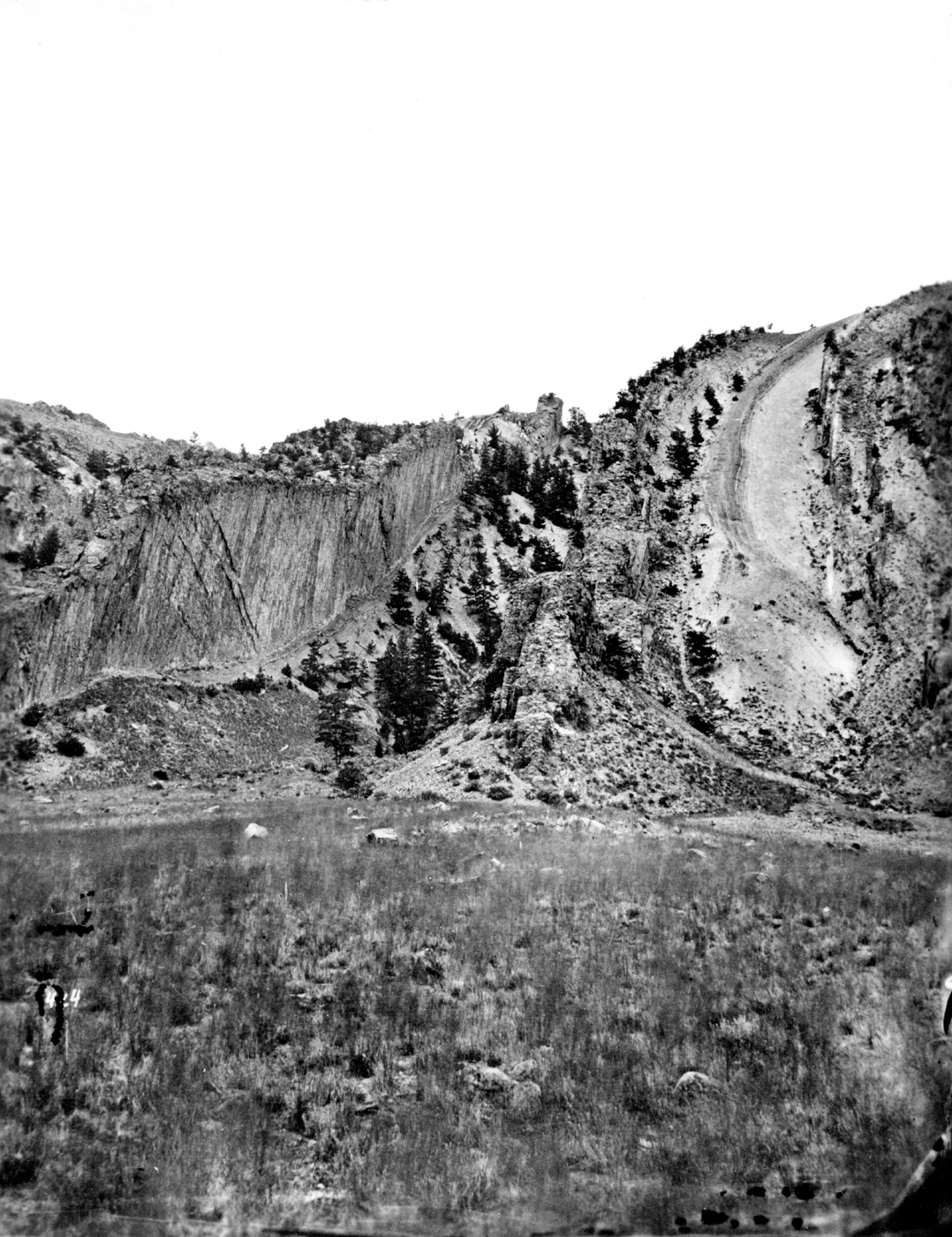
First photo of Devil's Slide by William Henry Jackson, 1871

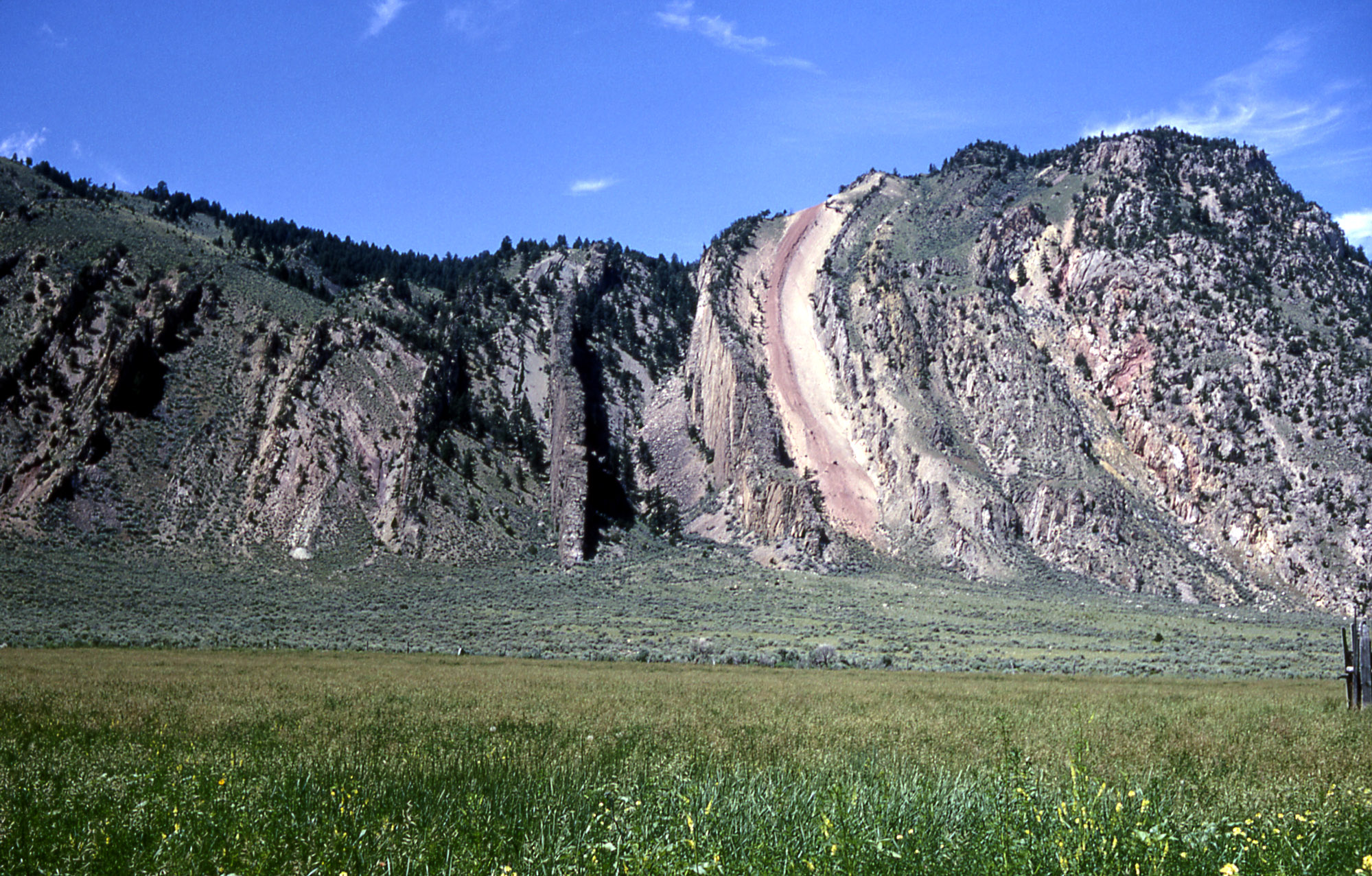
Devils Slide, 1965

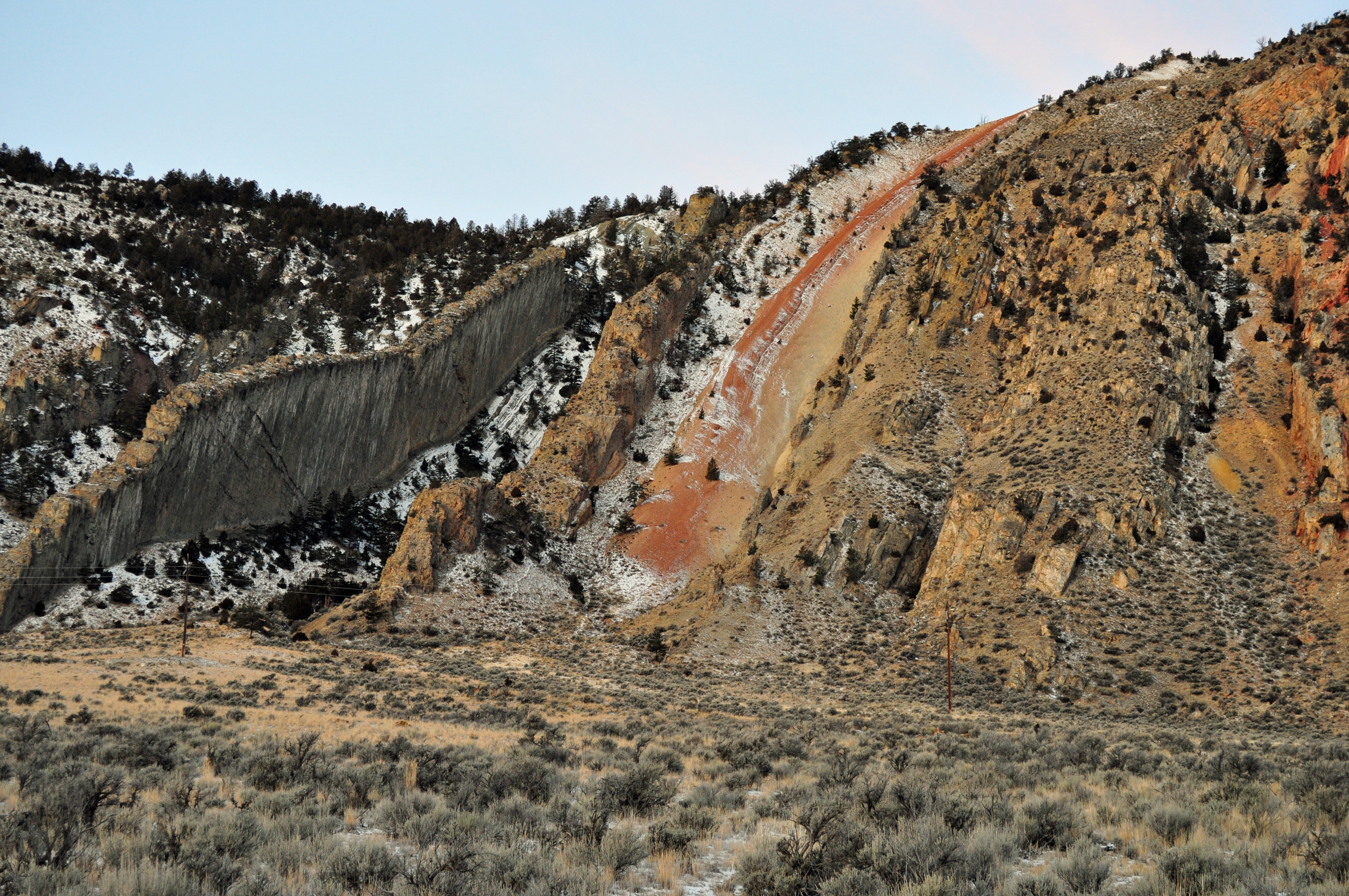
Devils Slide, 2009
