= St. Bernhard, Bretzenheim =

Coordinates: 49°58′39″N 8°14′42″E

St. Bernhard is a Catholic church dedicated to Bernard of Clairvaux in the Mainz borough of Bretzenheim. Together with the parishes of St. Achatius, St. Georg and St. Stephan (Marienborn), it is one of four churches in the Zaybachtal parish group.

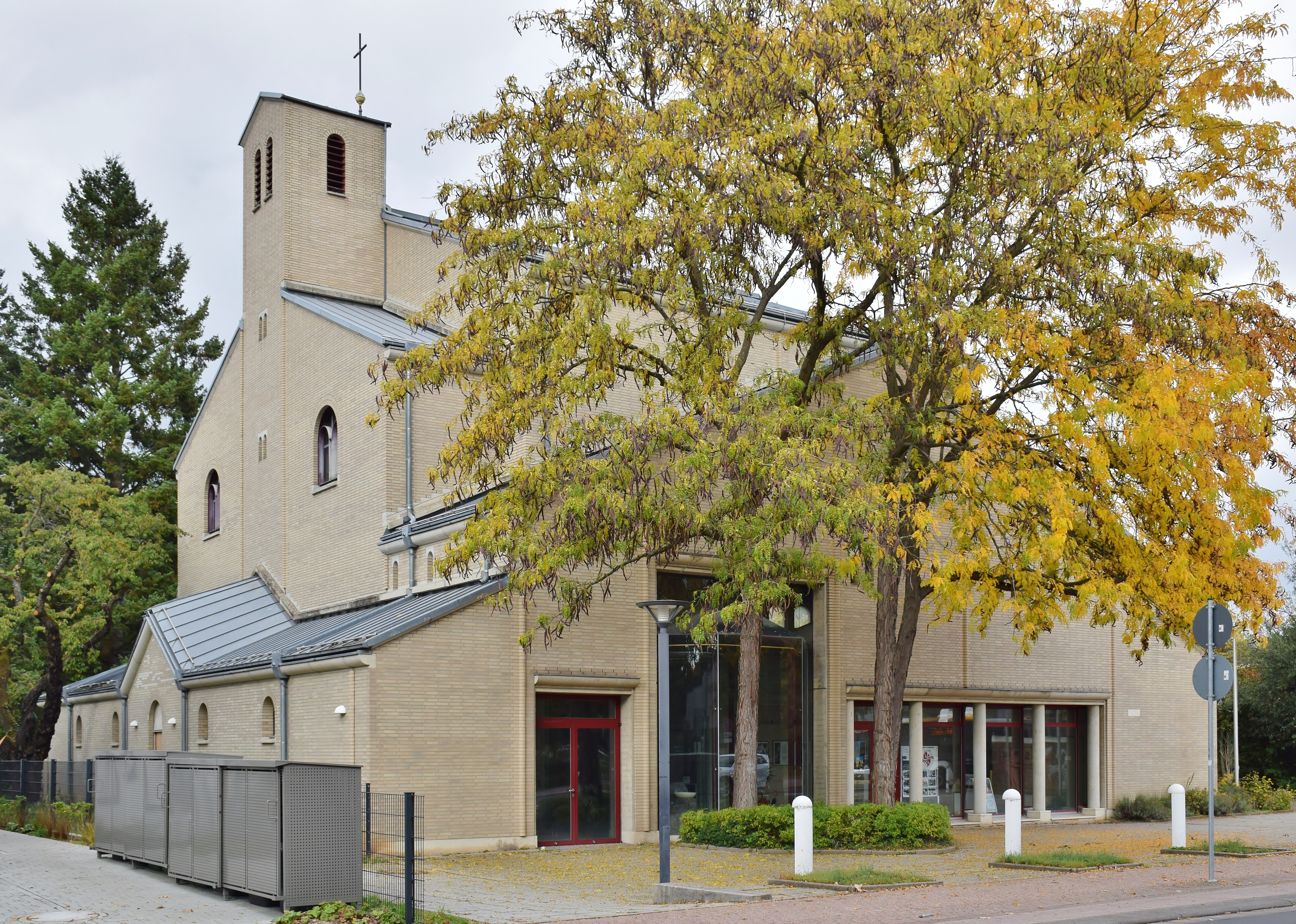
St. Bernhard

== History ==
The history of the young parish began with the construction of a community centre in 1973. Due to the continued increase in the number of Catholics in the rapidly growing borough of Bretzenheim, the Mainz-based team of architects Grüneberg und Partner was commissioned to design a parish church for the community centre built in the 1970s. Previously, a small chapel had been sufficient, which was equipped with a reserve for expansion.

The church, which was realised in reinforced concrete and glass, has a sophisticated structure. The single-nave hall church with a stepped-down façade incorporates a ridge turret instead of a church tower. Church towers were no longer promoted by the Diocese of Mainz at that time. The architects also skilfully used the baptistery in combination with the columns of the vestibule as an element of the façade structure. The interior walls are finished in béton brut, while the exterior of the church is clad in clinker brick. Romanesque-style churches were the model for the chosen architecture.

On 10 October 1992, the church was solemnly consecrated by Bishop Karl Lehmann.

== Naming ==
The church's patron saint refers to Bernard's stay in Mainz in 1146, where he took a stand against Radulf the Cistercian's call for the murder of Jews as ‘enemies of the Christian religion’. The parish has a partnership with the parish of St. Bernard (consecrated in 1959) in Mainz's twin city of Dijon.

== Organ ==
In the early years after the church was built, an electronic organ was used. However, as this instrument was not particularly impressive musically, the search began for a high-quality pipe organ.

The current organ was built by Aristide Cavaillé-Coll in a late Baroque case for the Church of Saint-Ferdinand des Ternes in the 17th arrondissement of Paris, dating from 1876/77. The late Baroque case made of solid oak was reused by Cavaillé-Coll. The five-part façade is characterised by three round towers connected by two flat panels. In 1912, the instrument became privately owned, and in 1951 it was moved to the Protestan Oratoire du Louvre in Paris. From 1971 to 1997, the organ was installed in the Protestant church of Suresnes near Paris and was sold to the parish of St. Bernhard in 1998. Organ builders Berger and Swiderski restored the instrument, which was inaugurated by Vicar General Werner Guballa on 17 December 1999. The slider chest instrument has eleven stops distributed over two manuals, the pedal has four transmissions, and the action is mechanical.

I Grand Orgue C–g^{3}
1.	Bourdon	16′
2.	Montre	8′
3.	Flûte harmonique	8′
4.	Prestant	4′

II Récit expressif C–g^{3}
5.	Cor de nuit	8′
6.	Viole de Gambe	8′
7.	Voix céleste	8′
8.	Flûte octaviante	4′
9.	Plein jeu IV
10.	Trompette harmonique	8′
11.	Basson-Hautbois	8′

Pedal C–f^{1}
Soubasse (aus I)	16′
Soubasse (aus II)	8′
Basse (aus I)	8′
Violoncelle (aus II)	8′
