= Franziskus Eisenbach =

German Roman Catholic prelate (1943–2024)

- Auxiliary Bishop Emeritus of Mainz
- Metropolis: Freiburg
- Appointed: 17 March 1988
- Term ended: 16 April 2002
- Other post: Titular Bishop of Sigus (1988–2024)

Orders
- Ordination: 30 July 1967 by Hermann Volk
- Consecration: 24 April 1988 by Karl Lehmann

Personal details
- Born: 1 May 1943 Groß Strehlitz, Gau Upper Silesia, Germany
- Died: 29 May 2024 (aged 81)
- Motto: In Laudem Gloriae Suae

Styles of Franziskus Eisenbach
- Reference style: His Excellency; The Most Reverend
- Spoken style: Your Excellency
- Religious style: Bishop

Franziskus Eisenbach (1 May 1943 – 29 May 2024) was a German Roman Catholic prelate, auxiliary bishop of Mainz from 1988 to 2002.

== Life and career ==
Eisenbach was born in Groß Strehlitz, Upper Silesia, on 1 May 1943. He was consecrated as a priest by Hermann Volk, Bishop of Mainz, at the Mainz Cathedral on 30 July 1967. After several years as an assistant priest (Kaplan) he became secretary of Bishop Volk in 1971. From 1975 he studied further and was promoted to the doctorate in 1981 with a dissertation titled "Die Gegenwart Christi im Gottesdienst: Systematische Studien zur Liturgiekonstitution des II. Vatikanischen Konzils", about the presence of Christ in the church service according to the Second Vatican Council. From October 1980, Eisenbach headed the Exerzitienhaus of the diocese in Dieburg and also the department Berufe der Kirche (offices of the church).

On 17 March 1988, Pope John Paul II appointed Eisenbach auxiliary bishop in Mainz with the titular bishopric of Sigus. He was consecrated on 24 April 1988 by the Mainz bishop Karl Lehmann. From 1993 he was responsible for institute of spiritual guidance of those working full-time in pastoral care.

In 2000, Eisenbach was accused by Mainz professor Änne Bäumer of having performed a major exorcism and sexual acts on her without permission. She reported him for physical assault and sexual abuse in the context of a pastoral care relationship. The Mainz diocese administration denied the exorcism, but admitted to "healing and liberation prayers". The Mainz public prosecutor's office dropped the case against Eisenbach in April 2001 due to a lack of suspicion of a crime. An enforcement action brought by the plaintiff at the Koblenz Higher Regional Court was dismissed in November 2001. A preliminary investigation by the Holy See, among other things on the grounds of the accusation of violating the seal of confession, did not lead to ecclesiastical criminal proceedings. However, Eisenbach had to agree to his resignation after a conversation with the then Prefect of the Congregation for the Doctrine of the Faith, Cardinal Josef Ratzinger.

Eisenbach renounced his office as auxiliary bishop in Mainz on 16 April 2002, and headed the parish of the Holy Cross in Bad Wimpfen from December 2002 to November 2011. He then worked there as parish vicar until May 2013. Since then, Franziskus Eisenbach continued to live in Bad Wimpfen as a retired priest, where he served as Rector ecclesiae of the local collegiate church of St. Peter until his death.

Eisenbach died on 29 May 2024, at the age of 81.

Catholic Church titles
Preceded by —	Auxiliary Bishop of Mainz; 1988–2002	Succeeded by —
Preceded by Johannes ter Schure	Titular Bishop of Sigus; 1988–2024	Succeeded by Vacant
