= Joshy George Pottackal =

Indian-German bishop of the Catholic Church (born 1977)

His Excellency, The Most Reverend Joshy Pottackal
- Auxiliary Bishop of Mainz
- Pottackal in 2026
- Church: Catholic Church
- See: Diocese of Mainz
- Appointed: 26 November 2025
- Installed: 15 March 2026
- Other post: Titular Bishop of Ceramussa (2025–)
- Previous post: Superior of the Carmelite province in Germany (since 2016)

Personal details
- Born: 30 April 1977 (age 49) Meenkunnam, Kerala, India
- Education: Pontifical Athenaeum Dharmaram Vidya Kshetram
- Motto: Per fidem ductus (Led by Trust)
- Coat of arms

Styles of Joshy George Pottackal
- Reference style: His Excellency; The Most Reverend
- Spoken style: Your Excellency
- Religious style: Bishop

Ordination history of Joshy George Pottackal
History
Priestly ordination
- Date: 28 December 2003
Episcopal consecration
- Principal consecrator: Peter Kohlgraf
- Co-consecrators: Stephan Burger, Wilmar Santin
- Date: 15 March 2026
- Place: Mainz Cathedral, Mainz

Joshy George Pottackal, OCarm (born 30 April 1977) is an Indian-born German Roman Catholic Carmelite prelate and auxiliary bishop in Mainz. Pottackal is the first Roman Catholic bishop in a German diocese who was not born in Europe.

== Life ==
Pottackal entered a Carmelite seminary in India in 1992 and joined the Carmelite Order, making his first vows in 1996. He studied philosophy in Thrissur and Catholic theology at Pontifical Athenaeum Dharmaram Vidya Kshetram, Bangalore. He was ordained a priest on 28 December 2003.

In 2004, he moved to Germany, where he completed language training and pastorals studies in Münster. He has served in the Diocese of Mainz in various roles, including chaplain, youth pastor, parish vicar, and parish priest. He later became deputy dean, acting dean, personnel officer for priests, and prefect at the Mainz seminary. He has also served as regional superior of the Carmelite province in Germany.

On 26 November 2025, he was appointed Titular Bishop of Ceramussa and Auxiliary Bishop of Mainz by Pope Leo XIV. He was consecrated on 15 March 2026 in Mainz Cathedral.
