= Heinrich Brück =

German Catholic church historian and bishop

- Bishop of Mainz
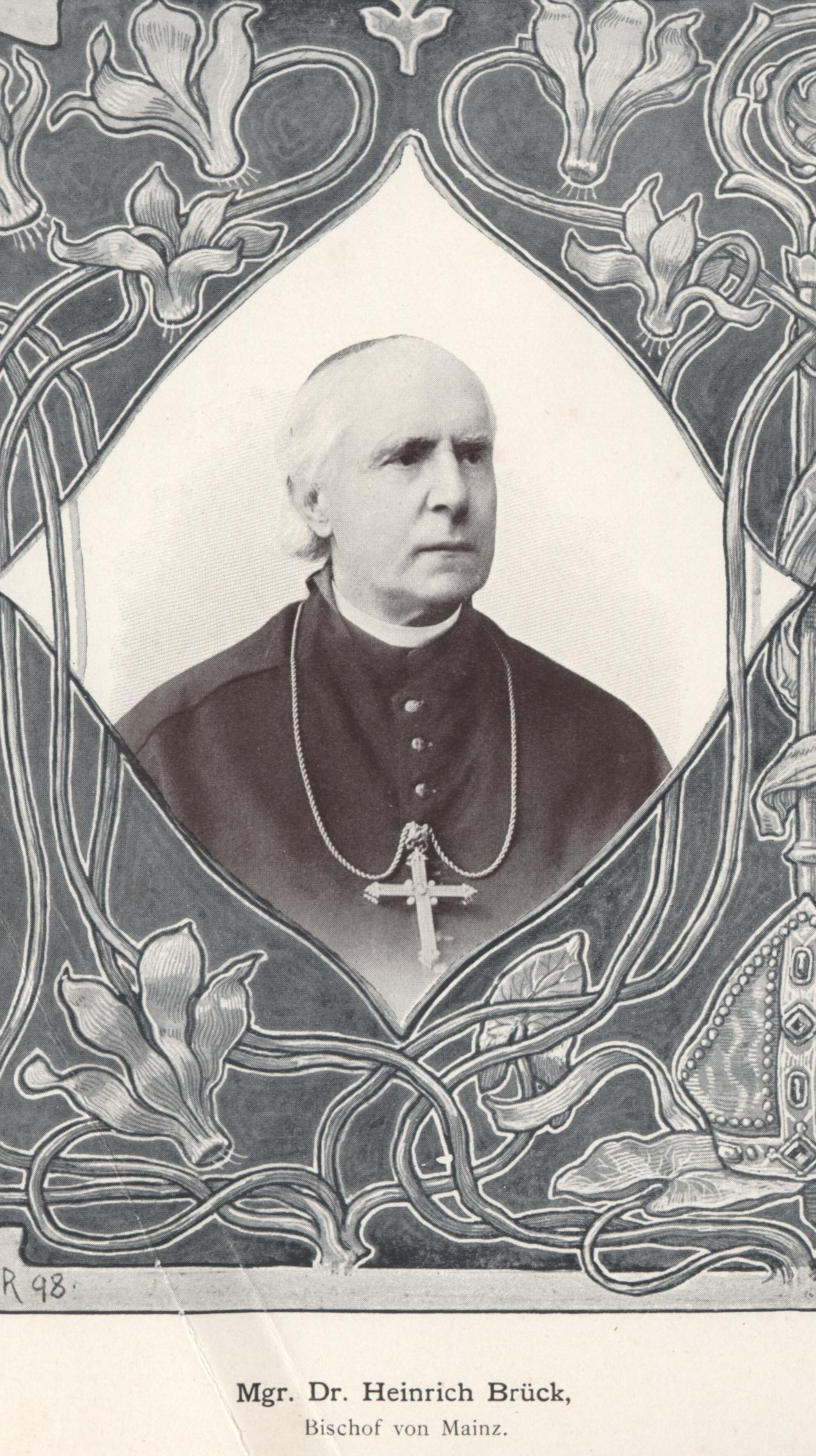
- Church: Catholic Church
- Diocese: Diocese of Mainz
- In office: 30 March 1900 – 4 November 1903
- Predecessor: Paul Leopold Haffner
- Successor: Georg Heinrich Kirstein

Orders
- Ordination: 30 March 1855
- Consecration: 20 May 1900 by Thomas Nörber

Personal details
- Born: 25 October 1831 Bingen, Grand Duchy of Hesse, German Confederation
- Died: 5 November 1903 (aged 72)
- Coat of arms

Heinrich Brück (25 October 1831, Bingen – 4 November 1903) was a German Catholic church historian, and Bishop of Mainz.

== Life ==
He followed for some time the cooper's trade. After a course of studies under of a distinguished ecclesiastic, Joseph Hirschel, he entered the seminary at Mainz. He was ordained to the priesthood in 1855, exercised for some time the ministry, and made a postgraduate course at Munich under Ignaz von Döllinger, and at Rome. In 1867 he was appointed to the chair of ecclesiastical history in the seminary of Mainz.

He continued to teach until his elevation to the episcopate, with the exception of the years from 1878 to 1887, when seminary was closed by the order of the Government due to the Kulturkampf. In 1889 he became a canon of Mainz Cathedral; he received also several positions of trust in the administration of the diocese. In 1899 he was chosen to be Bishop of Mainz.

== Works ==
Perhaps his best known work is his manual of church history, from Lehrbuch der Kirchengeschichte (Mainz, 1874; 8th ed., 1902). It has been translated into English, French, and Italian. The author showed himself possessed of extensive knowledge not only in history, but also in theology and canon law. A more special work is his Geschichte der katholischen Kirche in Deutschland im neunzehnten Jahrhundert ("History of the Catholic Church in Germany in the Nineteenth Century"), in five volumes (1887-1905).

He was also the author of an account of rationalistic movements in Catholic Germany (1865), a life of Dean Lennig (1870), and a work on secret societies in Spain (1881).

== Literature ==
- https://www.newadvent.org/cathen/03004a.htm CE
- Anton Ph. Brück (1955). "Brück, Heinrich". Neue Deutsche Biographie (in German). Vol. 2. Berlin: Duncker & Humblot. p. 654. (full text online).
- Ludwig Lenhart: Bischof Dr. Heinrich Brück (1831–1903). In: Archiv für mittelrheinische Kirchengeschichte, Jg. 15 (1963), S. 261–333.
- Friedrich Wilhelm Bautz (1975). "Brück, Heinrich". In Bautz, Friedrich Wilhelm (ed.). Biographisch-Bibliographisches Kirchenlexikon (BBKL) (in German). Vol. 1. Hamm: Bautz. cols. 763–764. ISBN 3-88309-013-1.
- Jochen Lengemann: MdL Hessen. 1808–1996. Biographischer Index (= Politische und parlamentarische Geschichte des Landes Hessen. Bd. 14 = Veröffentlichungen der Historischen Kommission für Hessen. Bd. 48, 7). Elwert, Marburg 1996, ISBN 3-7708-1071-6, S. 90.
- Klaus-Dieter Rack, Bernd Vielsmeier: Hessische Abgeordnete 1820–1933. Biografische Nachweise für die Erste und Zweite Kammer der Landstände des Großherzogtums Hessen 1820–1918 und den Landtag des Volksstaats Hessen 1919–1933 (= Politische und parlamentarische Geschichte des Landes Hessen. Bd. 19 = Arbeiten der Hessischen Historischen Kommission. NF Bd. 29). Hessische Historische Kommission, Darmstadt 2008, ISBN 978-3-88443-052-1, S. 191–192.
- Bettina Braun: Toleranz vs. Identitätskonstruktion in den Kirchengeschichten Albert Haucks und Heinrich Brücks. In: Kerstin Armborst-Weihs, Judith Becker (Hrsg.): Geschichtsschreibung und Geschichtsbewusstsein zwischen religiösem Anspruch und historischer Erfahrung. Vandenhoeck & Ruprecht, Göttingen 2010, ISBN 978-3-525-10096-7, S. 273–294.
