= St. John's Church, Mainz =

Coordinates: 49°59′54″N 8°16′20″E

Johanniskirche St. John's Church
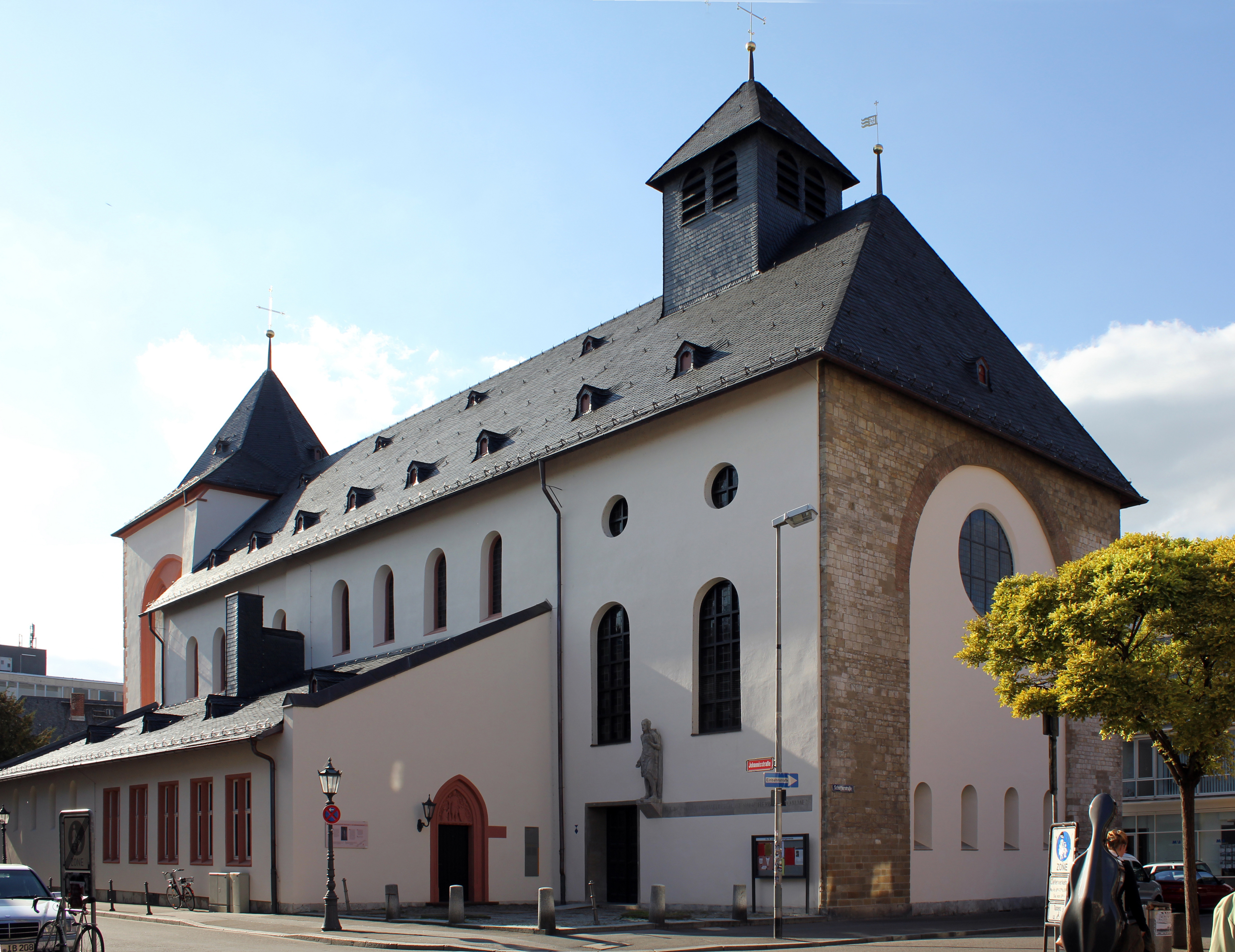
- The church from the southeast
- Interactive map of the Johanniskirche; St. John's Church area

General information
- Architectural style: Carolingian
- Location: Mainz, Germany
- Construction started: before 910

St. John's Church (in German Johanniskirche) is located beneath Mainz Cathedral in the historical center of Mainz, Germany. This 1100-year-old church was the first episcopal see of the Bishop of Mainz. It is the oldest church in Mainz, the oldest cathedral in the Germany of today and the only preserved cathedral building from late Carolingian and early Ottonian time in Germany.

St. John's Church is predominantly Carolingian in style, but later exterior additions over many centuries have resulted in the appearance of various architectural influences seen today. It comprises three naves and stands under the patronage of John the Baptist today. It can be assumed that the church was dedicated initially to Martin of Tours since Martin is the Patron saint of the Roman Catholic Diocese of Mainz, then to St. Salvator, consecrated in 911 by Archbishop Hatto I and served as the cathedral for the Bishop of Mainz until the appointment of Willigis as Archbishop of Mainz in 975. It is documented that archbishop Erkanbald was buried in this first cathedral. In 2019, a sarcophagus was opened to gain more information on the early history of the diocese of Mainz. Whether it concerns the remains of cleric Erkanbald, buried in 1021, is investigated since then said research director Guido Faccani.

== Building ==
The church building dates from the early medieval era; construction of the main area of the church began in the 7th century. In the basement archaeologists have been encountered with two burials. The already exposed skeleton in a grave shaft probably dates from the first phase, i.e. from the 7th century. ″It is not a bishop, because a bishop would have been buried in the area of St. Alban's Abbey.″ The successional building kept the guidelines of the floor plan of the original building. Knöchlein speculates that as the predecessors have also been made of stone, which is uncommon for the post-Roman period, leads to the conclusion that the early Christians in Mainz worshipped first in either a civilian building near the Forum or on the foundations of an ancient temple.

Hatto's Church is one of the few remaining late Carolingian churches. It was built as a basilica, its wide central nave is higher than the narrow aisles. The building was designed as a double chancel facility in east-west direction. Hatto has partially used wall remains of the first building. There are remains that have been integrated into the new church. In other places, this was completely demolished. The archeologists assume that it was a planned demolition and reconstruction - probably a smooth transition. One fact is that the ground level has risen by 2.60 meters since Hattos times comprising debris of solid masonry. The present floor level is probably the seventh level in total. When the scientists of the Institut für Europäische Kunstgeschichte of the Heidelberg University were scratching the plaster of the wall, they encountered in some places still in nine meters height tuff masonry from the 6th or 7th century.

In the East the choir room is as wide as the nave. The side walls of the east choir are opened by two arched windows and overlying round windows (so-called Oeil-de-boeuf). West to the choir joins a rectangular nave flanked by narrow aisles. The walls of the nave are at the top of the clerestory broken by four arched windows, including four arcades open each (now closed) in the former aisles (now parish rooms).

== Literature ==
- Dethard von Winterfeld, Der Alte Dom zu Mainz. Zur Architektur der Johanniskirche. (Research contributions of the Bischöfliches Dom- und Diözesanmuseum, volume 1) 2013. ISBN 978-3-7954-2777-1
- Friedhelm Jürgensmeier, ed. (1988), "Das Bistum Mainz", Beiträge zur Mainzer Kirchengeschichte (in German), ISBN 3782005341
- Fritz Arens; Hanswolf Scriba (1977), "Mainz, St. Johannis", Kleine Kunstführer (in German), no. 1109
- Fritz Arens (1961), "Die Kunstdenkmäler der Stadt Mainz : Teil 1, Kirchen A-K", Die Kunstdenkmäler von Rheinland-Pfalz (in German), no. 4, pp. 409 bis 442
