= Albert Stohr =

German bishop

- Bishop of Mainz
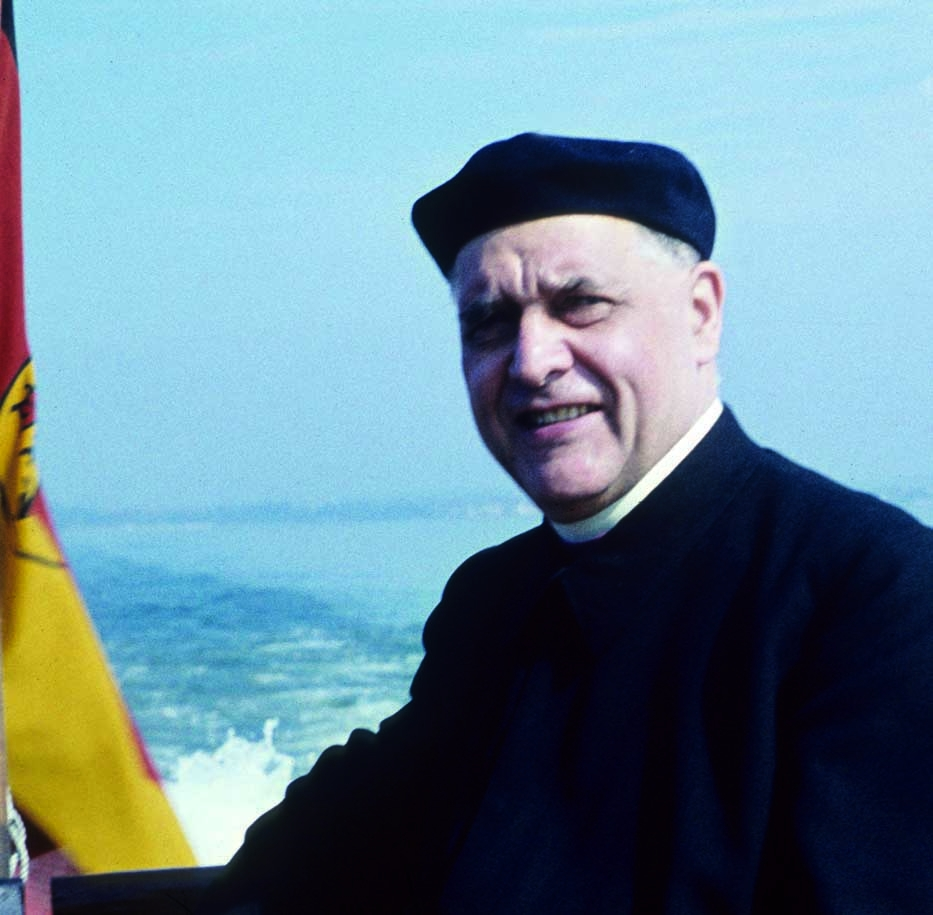
- Albert Stohr (1959)
- Church: Mainz Cathedral
- Province: Freiburg im Breisgau
- Diocese: Mainz
- Appointed: 17 July 1935
- Predecessor: Ludwig Maria Hugo

Orders
- Ordination: 19 October 1913
- Consecration: 24 August 1935 by Conrad Gröber, Ludwig Sebastian, Johann Baptist Sproll

Personal details
- Born: 13 November 1890 Friedberg, Germany
- Died: 3 June 1961 (aged 70)
- Denomination: Roman Catholic
- Coat of arms

Albert Stohr (13 November 1890 – 3 June 1961) was Bishop of Mainz from 17 July 1935 until his death.

Stohr was born in Friedberg, Germany. He entered the seminary in Mainz in 1909 and was ordained as a priest on 19 October 1913 in Mainz Cathedral. After the death of Bishop Ludwig Maria Hugo, he was elected bishop by the cathedral chapter on 10 June 1935 and confirmed by Pope Pius XI on 17 July 1935. He was consecrated by Archbishop Conrad Gröber on 24 August 1935.

His time in office was dominated by World War II and the subsequent reconstruction efforts. He died in Seligenstadt.

Amid 1941 Catholic protests over Nazi euthanasia led by Bishop Clemens August Graf von Galen, Stohr sermonized against the taking of life.

Catholic Church titles
Preceded by Ludwig Maria Hugo	Bishop of Mainz; 1935–1961	Succeeded by Hermann Volk
