= Hermann Volk =

German cardinal

His Eminence Hermann Volk
- Bishop Emeritus of Mainz
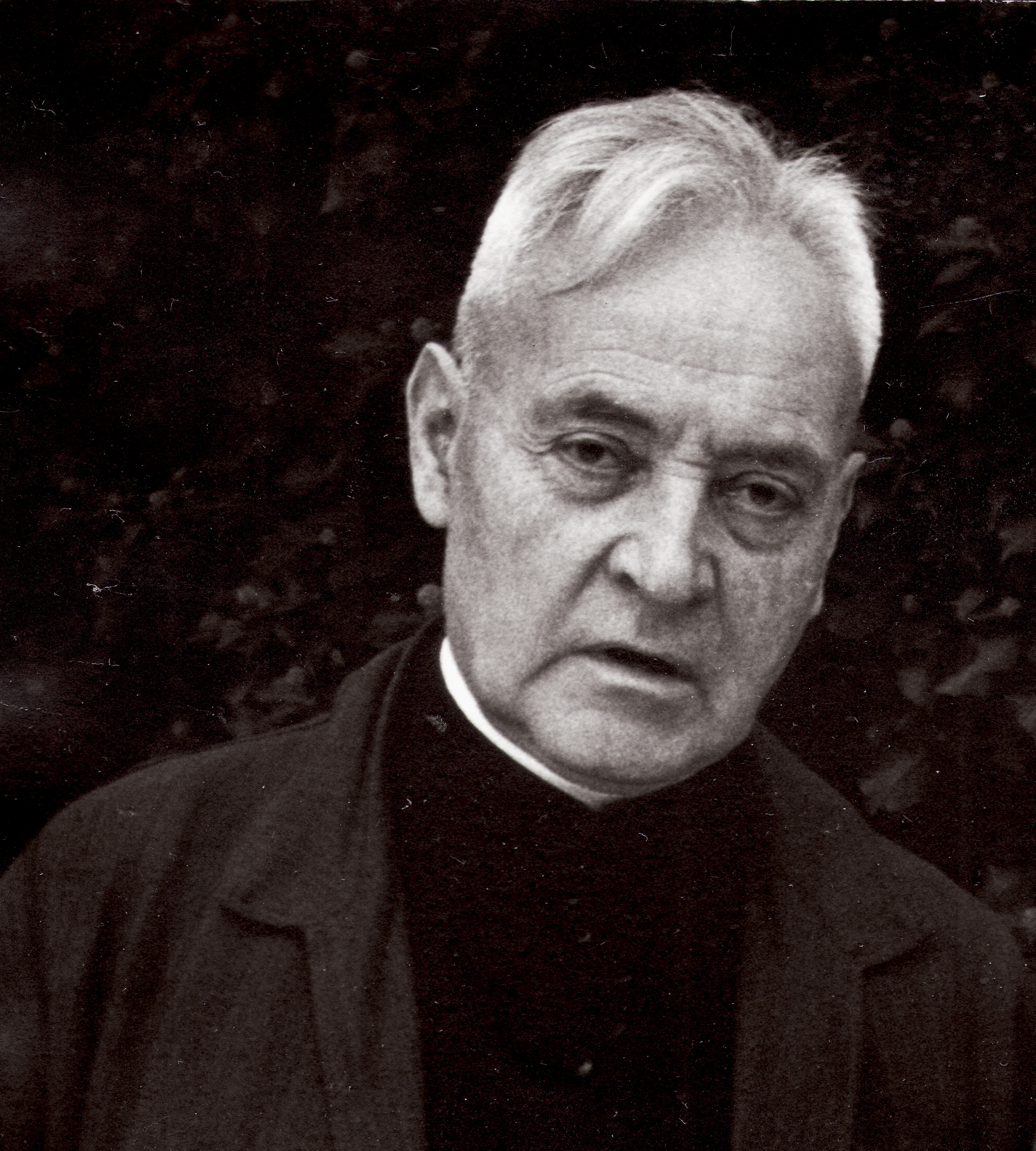
- The cardinal in 1975
- Church: Roman Catholic Church
- Diocese: Mainz
- See: Mainz
- Appointed: 25 March 1962
- Term ended: 27 December 1982
- Predecessor: Albert Stohr
- Successor: Karl Lehmann
- Other post: Cardinal-Priest of Santi Fabriano e Venanzio a Villa Fiorelli (1973-88)

Orders
- Ordination: 2 April 1927 by Ludwig Maria Hugo
- Consecration: 5 June 1962 by Hermann Josef Schäufele
- Created cardinal: 5 March 1973 by Pope Paul VI
- Rank: Cardinal-priest

Personal details
- Born: Hermann Volk; 27 December 1903 Steinheim, Westphalia, German Empire
- Died: 1 July 1988 (aged 84) Mainz, West Germany
- Education: University of Münster; University of Fribourg
- Motto: Deus Omnia in omnibus
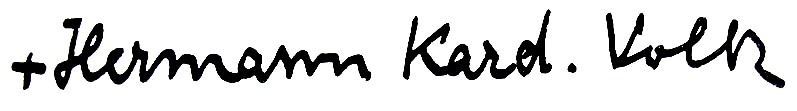
- Signature: Hermann Volk's signature

- Coat of arms: Hermann Volk's coat of arms

Styles of Hermann Volk
- Reference style: His Eminence
- Spoken style: Your Eminence
- Religious style: Cardinal
- Informal style: Cardinal
- See: Mainz (emeritus)

Hermann Volk (27 December 1903 – 1 July 1988) was a German cardinal of the Roman Catholic Church. He served as Bishop of Mainz from 1962 to 1982, and was elevated to the cardinalate in 1973.

== Early life and ministry ==
Hermann Volk was born in Steinheim to Franz Volk, an upholsterer, and his wife Catharina Josepha Kaiser. He received his early education in Steinheim and Hanau, and then entered the seminary in Mainz, where he studied philosophy and theology for four years.

Volk was ordained to the priesthood by Bishop Ludwig Maria Hugo on 27 April 1927. He then did pastoral work in Mainz, serving as a chaplain in Alzey (1927–1931) and in St. Ignaz (1932–1935). From 1935 to 1938 he studied at the University of Fribourg in Switzerland, from where he obtained his doctorate in philosophy, with a thesis entitled: Die Kreaturauffassung von Karl Barth, and his doctorate in theology, with a thesis on: Emil Brunners Lehre von der ursprünglichen Gottesebenbildlichkeit des Menschen.

Volk was an assistant of a vicariate in Gau-Odernheim from 1940 to 1941, when he was named Vicar of Nidda, where he would then serve as pastor from 1942 to 1945. In 1943 Volk obtained his habilitation in dogmatic theology from the University of Münster, with a work entitled: Emil Brunners Lehre von dem Sinder. He then served as assistant professor (1945–1946) and professor (1946–1962) of theology, and rector (1954–1955) at the University of Münster. He was raised to the rank of a domestic prelate of his holiness on 25 February 1962.

== Episcopate ==
On 3 March 1962 Volk was elected Bishop of Mainz by the cathedral chapter, and confirmed as such by Pope John XXIII on 25 March 1962. He received his episcopal consecration on the following 5 June from Archbishop Hermann Schäufele, with Bishops Carl Joseph Leiprecht and Joseph Reuß serving as co-consecrators, in the Cathedral of Mainz.

Bishop Volk then attended the Second Vatican Council until 1965. Known as an advocate of ecumenism, the Bishop was dedicated to reconciling the Catholic Church and Protestant communities. In 1963, he agreed to support a married Lutheran minister, Ernest Adam Beck, who had converted to Catholicism and wished to become a priest.

== Cardinalate ==
Pope Paul VI created him Cardinal-Priest of Ss. Fabiano e Venanzio a Villa Fiorelli in the consistory of 5 March 1973. Volk was one of the cardinal electors who participated in the conclaves of August and October 1978, which selected Popes John Paul I and John Paul II respectively.

After twenty years of service, he resigned as Bishop of Mainz on his seventy-ninth birthday, 27 December 1982. Volk later lost the right to participate in any future papal conclaves upon reaching age 80 on 27 December 1983.

The Cardinal died after a long illness in Mainz, at age 84. He is buried in the western crypt of Mainz Cathedral.

Catholic Church titles
Preceded by Albert Stohr	Bishop of Mainz; 1962–1982	Succeeded by Karl Lehmann
