= Georg Heinrich Kirstein =

German Roman Catholic clergyman

- Bishop of Mainz
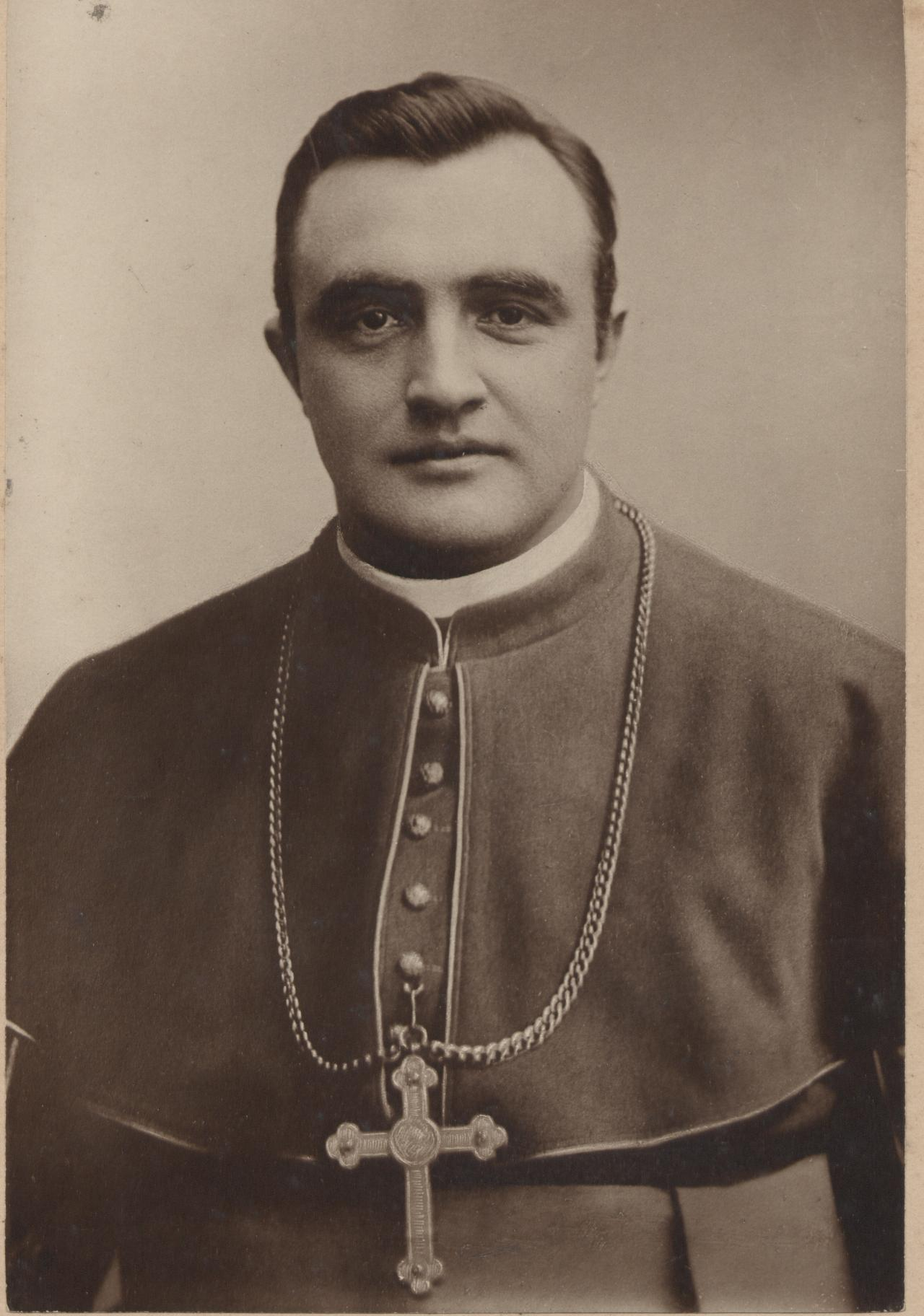
- 1904 photograph of Kirstein
- Church: Catholic Church
- Diocese: Diocese of Mainz
- In office: 8 February 1904 – 15 April 1921
- Predecessor: Heinrich Brück
- Successor: Ludwig Maria Hugo

Orders
- Ordination: 14 November 1880
- Consecration: 19 March 1904 by Thomas Nörber

Personal details
- Born: Georg Heinrich Maria Kirstein; 2 July 1858 Mainz, Grand Duchy of Hesse and by Rhine, German Confederation
- Died: 15 April 1921 (aged 62) Mainz, People's State of Hesse, German Reich
- Coat of arms

Georg Heinrich Maria Kirstein (2 July 1858 in Mainz – 15 April 1921 in Mainz) was a German Roman Catholic clergyman. From 1904 until his death he served as Bishop of Mainz.
