= Erkanbald =

- Archbishop of Mainz
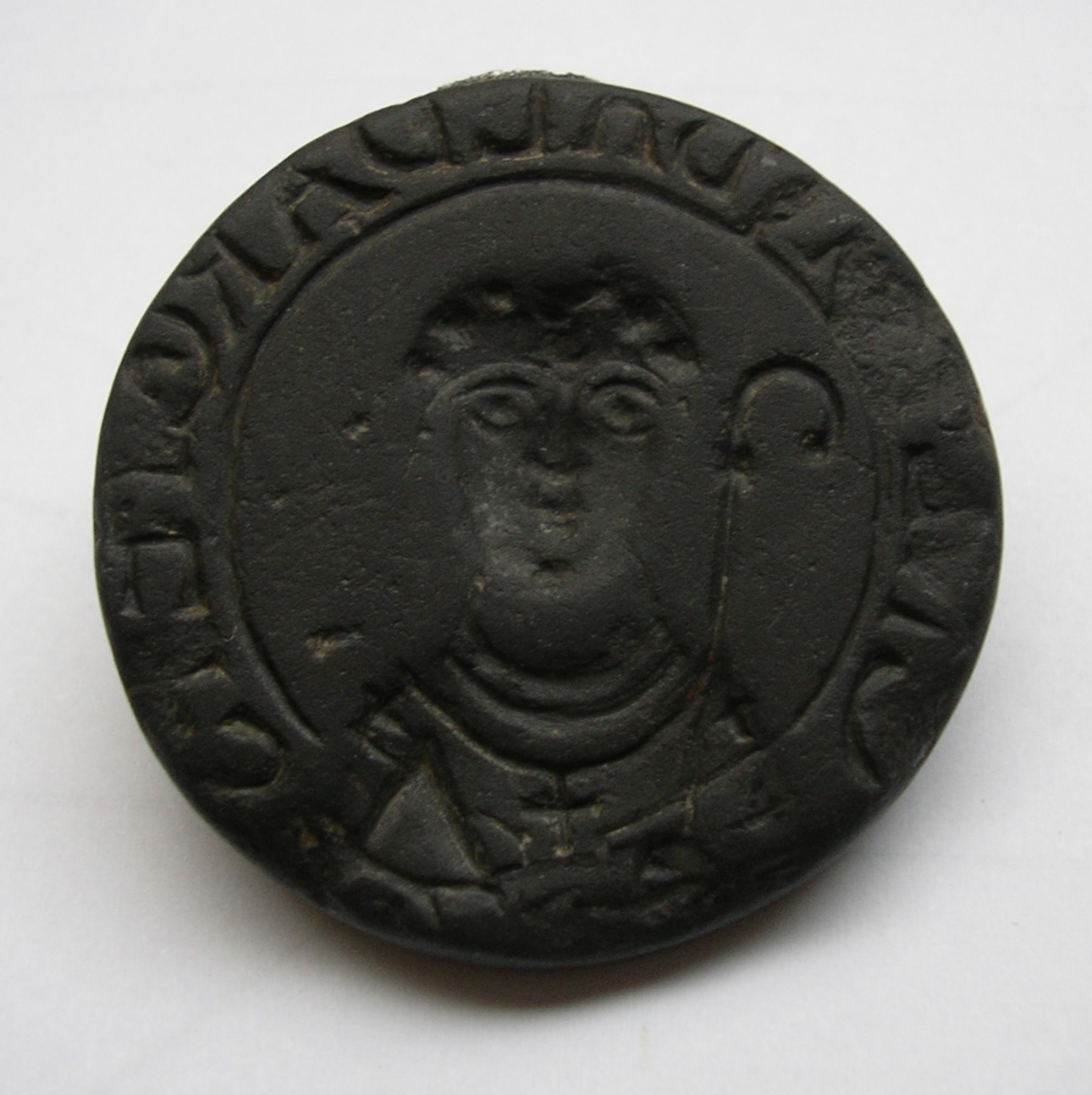
- A seal stamp of the archbishop Erkanbald, made of slate, around 1011. A joint possession of Hamburg Museum and Focke Museum.
- Church: Catholic Church
- Diocese: Electorate of Mainz
- In office: 1011–1021

Personal details
- Died: 17 August 1021

Erkanbald (died 17 August 1021) was the Abbot of Fulda from 997 and afterwards Archbishop of Mainz from 1011 until his death.

Erkanbald was a member of the family of the counts of Ölsburg and was thus related to Bernard III of Sommerescheburg, Bishop of Hildesheim. He supported the election of Henry IV, Duke of Bavaria, as King of Germany and was rewarded for it in 1011 when the ancient see of Mainz became vacant.

He apparently did not receive the Italian arch chancellery of his immediate predecessor Willigis from Henry II. Several times he appeared as Intervenient in the documents of the emperor, and he consecrated the bishops of Verden and Prague to his church province Mainz. In 1013/14 he took part in the procession to Rome, after which he supported the emperor in carrying out the reform in Fulda. He also supported the emperor in politics in Lower Lorraine and towards Poland.

On 4 June 2019, a sarcophagus was opened in the St. John's Church, Mainz, to gain more information on the early history of the diocese of Mainz. Unfortunately, there were no Bishop's ring or other episcopal insignia on the body. Whether it concerns the remains of cleric Erkanbald, buried in 1021, is being investigated further said research director Guido Faccani. The skeleton was very fragile and was severely affected by the covering with calcium oxide, with the exception of the feet.

In November 2019 a press conference unveiled that the investigations revealed that the body inside was Archbishop Erkanbald. Indications, according to the restorer Anja Bayer, were a chasuble made of blue-coloured silk, which ended with a gold border on the neck of the deceased. It consists of an unpatterned samite and is made from a piece of fabric according to a classic cut. From the shoulders to the hem the length of the garment is 124 cm. On the chasuble there was again a woolen fabric, which was a pallium. The garment nearest to the body is a silk Dalmatic or Tunicella. The fabric has zoomorphically decorated medallions, vertical borders and a slit on the side. The dead man also wore episcopal sandals. For the sandals the period from 980 to 1020 is considered the most probable dating. Bayer analyzed the elaborately crafted shoes together with Jutta Göpfrich, former head of restoration at the German Leather Museum. The goatskin shoes lay broken on the disintegrated foot bone. A sandal shape with star-shaped decorative seams is recognizable. They can be compared with the pontifical shoes of Gotthard of Hildesheim (†1038) and had to belong to a high ranking person. Only the highest clerics, especially bishops, were entitled to these pontifical vestments. Studies by anthropologist Carola Berszin showed that the 1.82 m tall, 40 to 60 year old man weighed about 70 kg and that he suffered from gout in his feet and ankylosing spondylitis. Why he lay upside down in the coffin is unclear. DNA investigations will be carried out in Bolzano.

Thus it is also proven that the today evangelical Johanniskirche was the first cathedral of the episcopal city of Mainz, in front of the later built today's Mainz Cathedral, which is bishop seat since 1036. That Erkanbald chose his official church for his burial is an extraordinary step in the burial tradition of the bishops and archbishops of Mainz. Up to his predecessor Willigis all were buried outside the city surrounded by walls.

Preceded by Willigis	Archbishop of Mainz; 1011–1021	Succeeded by Aribo
