= Peter Kohlgraf =

German Roman Catholic bishop (born 1967)

The Most Reverend Lord Peter Kohlgraf
- Bishop of Mainz
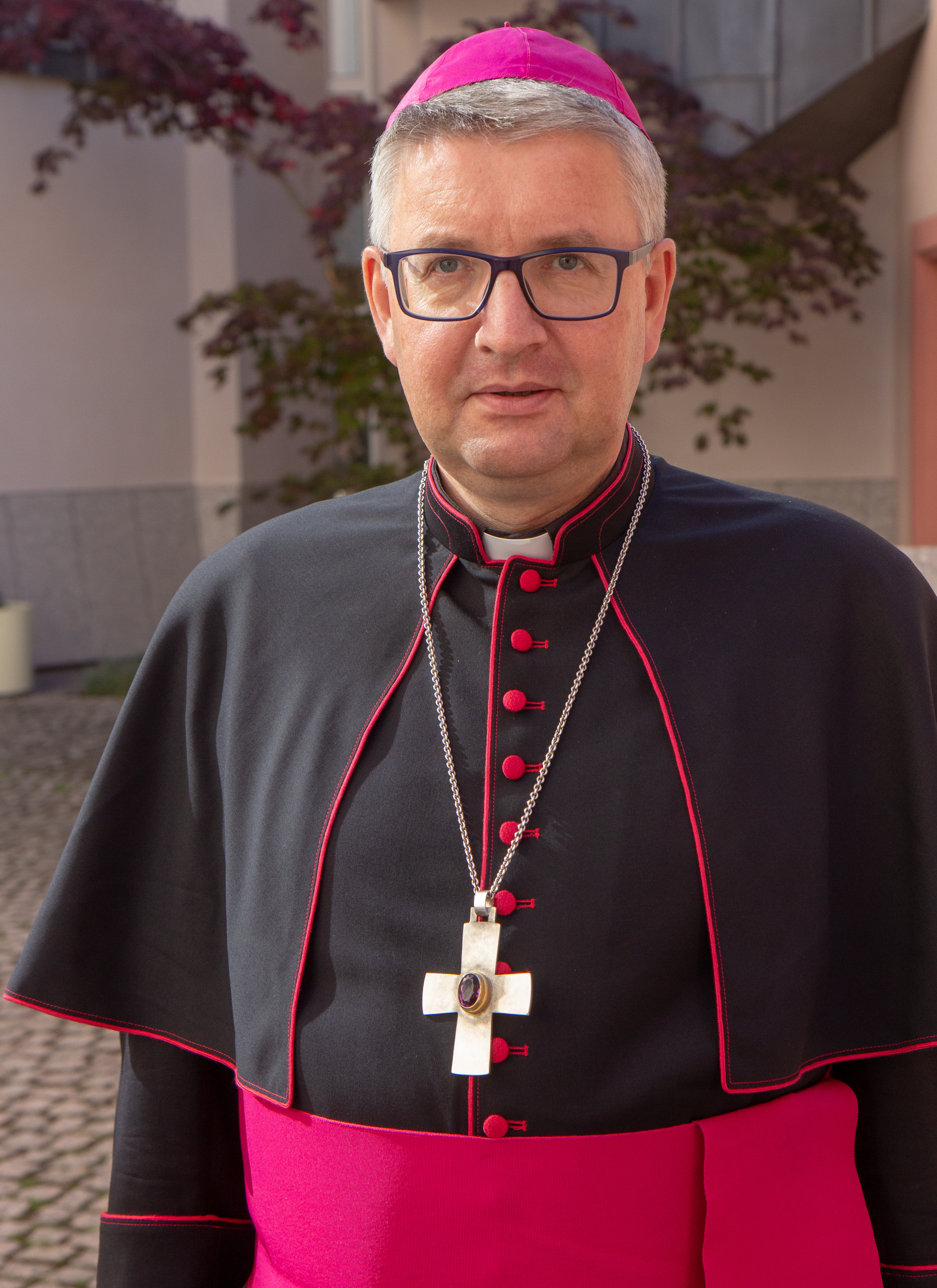
- Peter Kohlgraf (2018)
- Church: Mainz Cathedral
- Province: Freiburg im Breisgau
- Diocese: Mainz
- Appointed: 18 April 2017
- Predecessor: Karl Lehmann

Orders
- Ordination: 19 June 1993 by Joachim Meisner
- Consecration: 27 August 2017 by Karl Lehmann, Rainer Maria Woelki, Stephan Burger

Personal details
- Born: 21 March 1967 (age 59) Cologne, West Germany
- Denomination: Roman Catholic
- Motto: Appropinquavit regnum Dei (English: "The kingdom of God has come near you") – Luke 10:09
- Coat of arms: Peter Kohlgraf's coat of arms

Coat of arms of Peter Kohlgraf

Peter Kohlgraf (born March 21, 1967) is a German Catholic prelate who has served as Bishop of Mainz since 2017.

== Life ==
Kohlgraf was born the son of a mason and a nurse. After his Abitur in 1986 at the Dreikönigsgymnasium in Cologne, he studied philosophy and Catholic theology at the University of Bonn and for one semester in Salzburg. Kohlgraf graduated from university in 1991 and went to the seminary of the Archdiocese of Cologne. On June 19, 1993, he was ordained in Cologne Cathedral by the Archbishop of Cologne, Joachim Kardinal Meisner – together with the later Archbishop of Hamburg Stefan Heße and the later suffragan bishop of Cologne, Dominikus Schwaderlapp. The first positions of Kohlgraf as a priest were in Euskirchen and in Bad Honnef-Rhöndorf, before he became school-chaplain at the Kardinal-Frings-Gymnasium in Bonn-Beuel in 1999. In 2000, he gained his doctorate with Ernst Dassmann at the University of Bonn with the topic The ecclesiology of the Episcopal Letter in the interpretation by John Chrysostom.

Peter Kohlgraf was vice-director at the Collegium Albertinum in Bonn from 2003 to 2009 and then became a school-chaplain again, this time at the Gymnasium Marienberg. In 2010, he qualified for the professorship of religious education at the University of Münster at Udo Schmälzle with the topic Faith in conversation. The search for Christian identity and relevance in Alexandrian fathers theology. A model for practical-theological endeavor today? Kohlgraf was Privatdozent at the Westfälische Wilhelms-Universität in Münster until 2013 and then professor of pastoral theology and practical theology at the catholic university of Mainz. He was living in Partenheim in Rhenish Hesse.

On April 18, 2017, Pope Francis nominated Peter Kohlgraf to be Bishop of Mainz. As his motto, he chose Appropinquavit regnum Dei! – The kingdom of God has come near you! (Mk 1:15 and Lk 10:9) His Consecration in the Mainz Cathedral was conducted by his predecessor Karl Lehmann on August 27, 2017. He is the youngest diocesan bishop in Germany.

== Coat of arms ==
Kohlgraf's episcopal coat of arms incorporates elements such as the wheel from the arms of the Diocese of Mainz, the key and eight golden lozenges from the Diocese of Worms. In the lower silver shield there are three blue waves that symbolize the river Rhine. The Rhine connects Mainz and Worms with Kohlgrafs home town of Cologne. In addition, the river reminds of the history of life-giving and healing through the flowing water of the Christian faith, springing in baptism Ezekiel 47. Behind the crest shield the Golden Episcopal Cross. Above it the green episcopal galero with twelve tassels. Under the coat of arms is the banner of the bishop's motto: Appropinquavit regnum Dei – The kingdom of God is come nigh unto you - which is derived from Luke 10:9.

== Positions ==
In December 2018, Kohlgraf said that there could be married priests in the Roman Catholic Church in the future. In February 2021, Kohlgraf supported the blessing of same-sex marriages in the church.

== Nuclear Weapons ==
Bishop Kohlgraf leads the Pax Christi movement in Germany and has called for the removal of nuclear weapons from Germany.

Catholic Church titles
Preceded by Karl Kardinal Lehmann	Bishop of Mainz; Since 2017	Succeeded by –
