= Werner Guballa =

German Catholic bishop

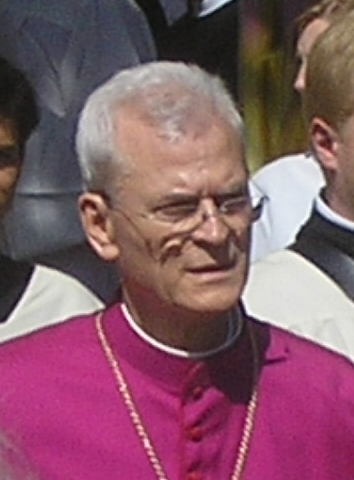
Werner Guballa

Coat of arms of Werner Guballa.

Werner Guballa (October 30, 1944 – February 27, 2012) was the Roman Catholic titular bishop of Catrum and auxiliary bishop of the Roman Catholic Diocese of Mainz, Germany.

Ordained to the priesthood in 1977, Guballa was named auxiliary bishop in 2003, and died while still in office.
