= Diocese of Mainz =

Latin Catholic ecclesiastical territory in Germany

Diocese of Mainz Diœcesis Moguntina Bistum Mainz

Catholic
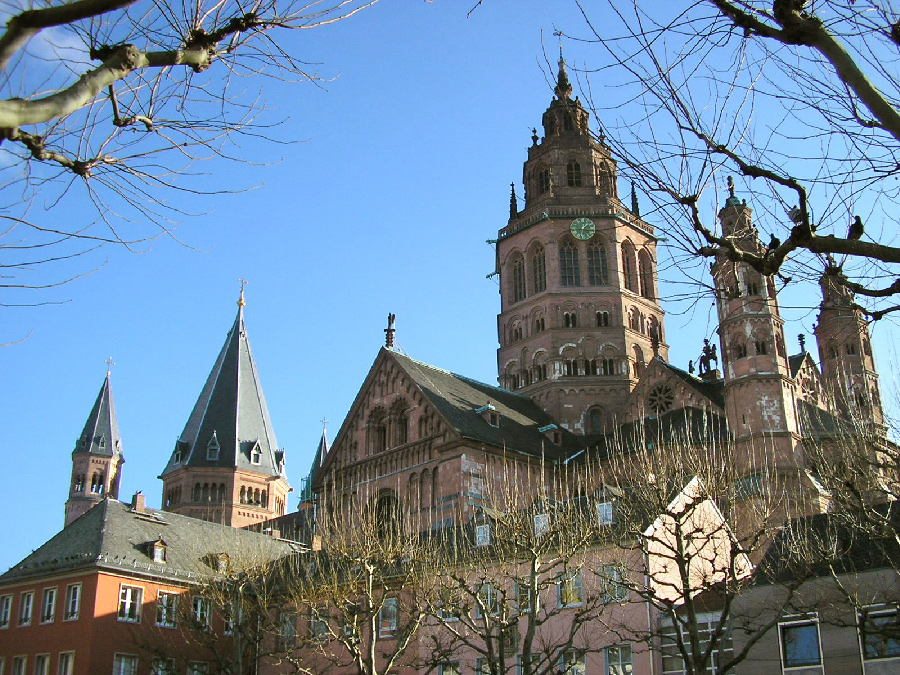
- Mainz Cathedral

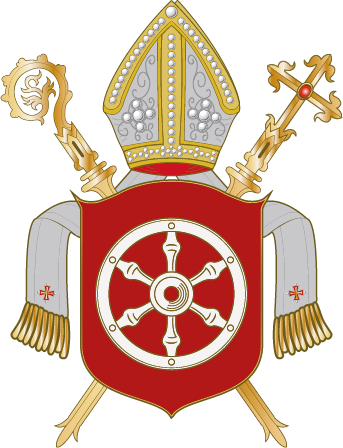
- Coat of arms

Location
- Country: Germany
- Ecclesiastical province: Freiburg
- Metropolitan: Archdiocese of Freiburg

Statistics
- Area: 7,692 km^{2} (2,970 sq mi)
- Population: Total; Catholics: (as of 2019); 2,982,141; 686,705 (24.1%)

Information
- Denomination: Catholic Church
- Sui iuris church: Latin Church
- Rite: Roman Rite
- Established: 4th Century
- Cathedral: Mainz Cathedral
- Patron saint: St. Martin of Tours

Current leadership
- Pope: Leo XIV
- Bishop: Peter Kohlgraf
- Metropolitan Archbishop: Stephan Burger
- Auxiliary Bishops: Joshy George Pottackal OCarm

Map
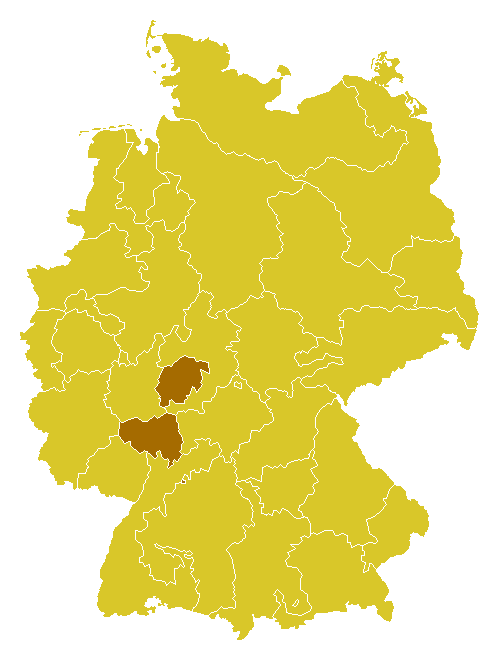

Website
- bistummainz.de

The Diocese of Mainz, (Latin: Diœcesis Moguntina, German: Bistum Mainz) historically known in English as Mentz as well as by its French name Mayence, is a Latin Church ecclesiastical territory or diocese of the Catholic Church in Germany. It was founded in 304, promoted in 780 to the Metropolitan Archbishopric of Mainz and demoted back in 1802 to a bishopric. The diocese is suffragan diocese in the ecclesiastical province of the metropolitan Archdiocese of Freiburg. Its district is located in the states of Rhineland-Palatinate and Hesse. The seat of the diocese is in Mainz at the Cathedral dedicated to Saints Martin and Stephen.

== History ==
- Established in 340 as Diocese of Mainz
- Gained territory in 755 from the suppressed Diocese of Erfurt
- Promoted in 780 as Metropolitan Archdiocese of Mainz
- Demoted (back) on the 29th of November, 1801 to Diocese of Mainz (gained territory from Diocese of Metz, Diocese of Speyer, Metropolitan Archdiocese of Trier and Diocese of Worms)
- Lost territories repeatedly; in April 1818 to Diocese of Konstanz, Diocese of Speyer and Diocese of Wurzburg; in July 1821 to Diocese of Paderborn; in August 1821 to Diocese of Fulda and to establish Diocese of Limburg, and exchanged territory with Diocese of Trier; in March 1824 to Diocese of Hildesheim.

== Organization, extent and statistics ==
Under Article 14 of the Reichskonkordat of 1933, which remains in force, the determination of the bishop to head the episcopal see and the composition of the chapter are governed by the provisions of Baden Concordat of 1932.

As of 2014, it pastorally served 749,583 Catholics (25.9% of 2,891,000 total) on 7,692 km^{2} in 319 parishes, 504 priests (409 diocesan, 95 religious), 124 deacons, 447 lay religious (132 brothers, 315 sisters), 19 seminarians.

It is divided into 20 deaneries, which in turn are divided into 136 pastoral care units. In 2007, these parish associations or parish groups included all 335 parishes and other chaplaincies of the diocese (as of 2007). Pastoral units on the parish level have been introduced as a result of a profound structural change in the Catholic Church in Germany in many dioceses; the constitution of these units was determined by particular law [law of a particular region or territory], i.e., allowing for differences from one diocese to another. In the diocese of Mainz, a parish group may be several parishes merged under the leadership of a single pastor. The parishes retain their church and state church legal personality. The pastor is attached to a pastoral team and a pastoral council. Parish associations, however, are combinations of several parishes, each with its own pastor. Several parish groups can join to form a parochial association.

== Catholic Education ==
=== Catholic Private Schools ===
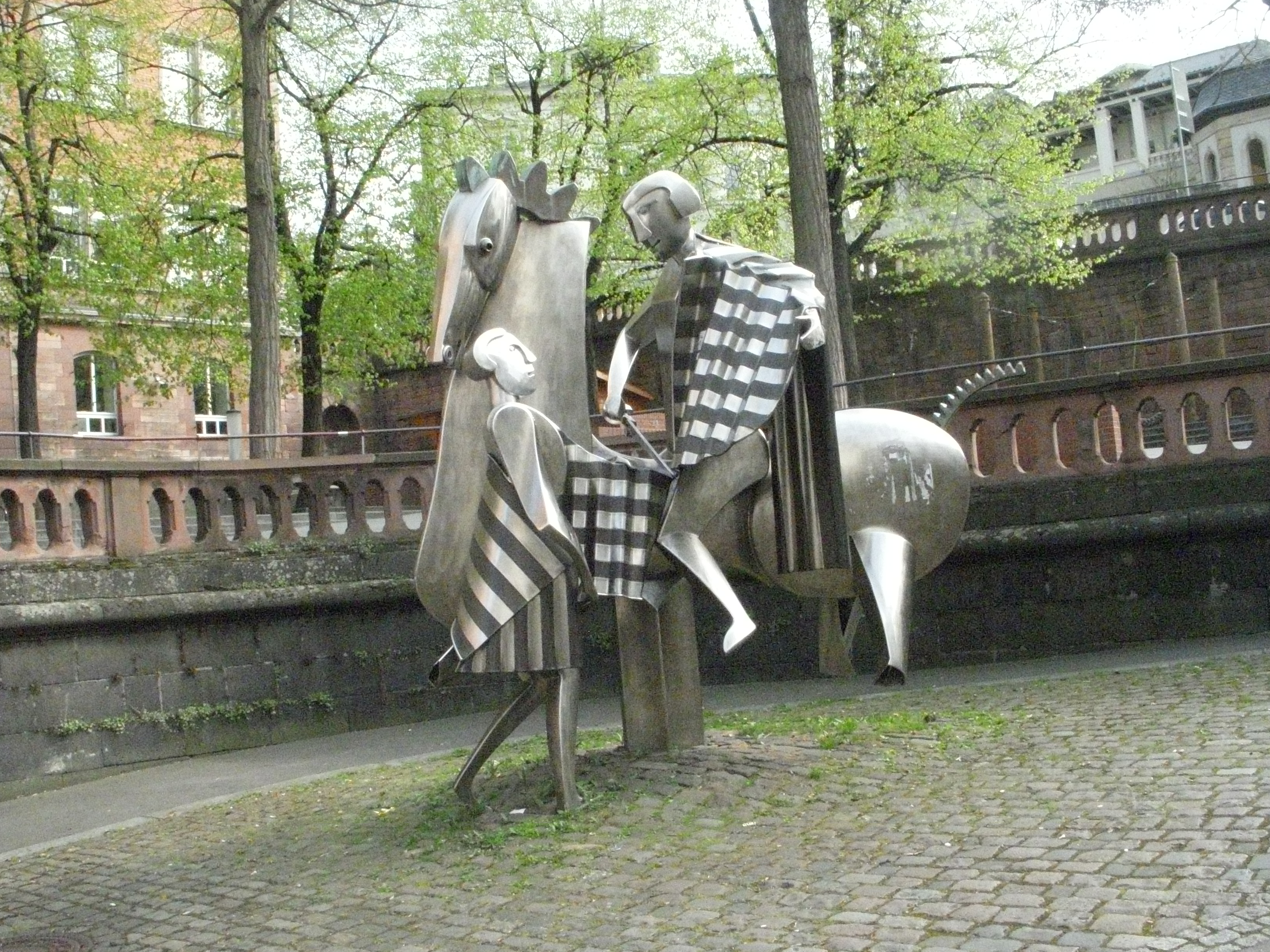
Modern stainless steel sculpture of St. Martin in front of the Martinus School Mainz in the old town of Mainz

The most important educational institution of the Diocese is the Catholic University of Applied Sciences, Mainz. Besides the Roman Catholic Diocese of Mainz and the (arch)dioceses of Cologne, Limburg, Speyer and Trier belong to the initiators of this university. There are also other schools as the Edith-Stein-Schule in Darmstadt, Liebfrauenschule in Bensheim, the Episcopal Willigis-Gymnasium in Mainz, Abendgymnasium Ketteler of Mainz and the Episcopal College Willigis secondary school in Mainz.

=== Facilities at state universities ===
The diocese maintains three facilities at state universities. The most important of them is the Catholic Theological Faculty at the University of Mainz. In addition, there is, at University of Giessen, the Institute for Catholic Theology and its didactics, which is located at the Department of History and Cultural Studies. At the Technische Universität Darmstadt there is an institute for theology and social ethics.

=== Bildungswerk der Diözese Mainz ===
The Bildungswerk der Diözese Mainz (educational works of the diocese of Mainz) promotes "... the church's adult education in the diocese from the parish to the diocesan level ..." The Bildungswerk is also a member of the Catholic Adult Education Hesse - Regional Working Group.

=== Other educational institutions ===
- Institut für Kirchenmusik Mainz: training institution for catholic Church musicians

== Major churches ==
=== Cathedrals and Major basilicas ===
- Mainz Cathedral
- Worms Cathedral
- Basilica of St. Martin, Bingen am Rhein
- Basilica of Sts. Marcellinus and Petrus, Seligenstadt
- Basilica of the Immaculate Conception, Sts. Peter and Paul, Ilbenstadt

=== Other well-known churches ===
- St. Stephen's Church, Mainz with Chagall windows
- St. Ludwig, Darmstadt, dome of Neoclassicism
- Collegiate church, Pfaffen-Schwabenheim
- Church of Our Lady, Worms
- Chapel of St. Roch, Bingen

== Liturgical calendar ==
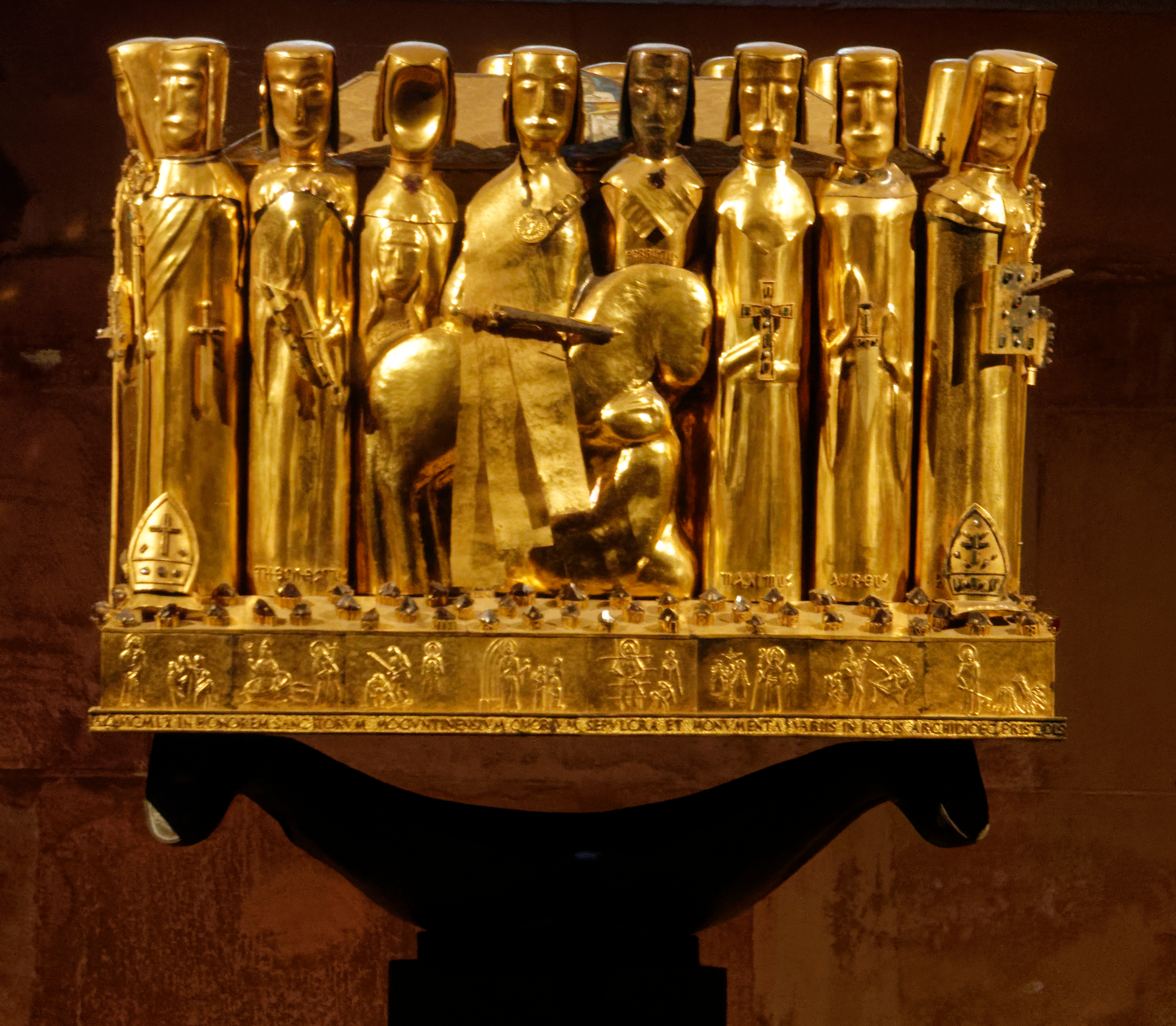
The reliquary shrine of the Mainz saints is located in the eastern crypt of Mainz Cathedral. On the occasion of the recovery of the cathedral and the 25th anniversary of Bishop Albert Stohr, a reliquary as goldwork was donated, depicting the 22 saints particularly venerated in the diocese of Mainz. As material gold-plated silver decorated with jewels had been chosen. Depicted are martyrs and bishops, priests, scholars and soldiers, confessors, virgins and widows, as listed left. The focus is on the diocese of Saint St. Martin; the canonization of Hildegard von Bingen was anticipated. The shrine had been crafted by the Mainz goldsmith Richard Walker.

Local feasts of the diocese are:

- 5. January:John Neumann, Redemptorist priest and fourth Bishop of Philadelphia
- 4. February: Rabanus Maurus, Frankish Benedictine monk, archbishop of Mainz
- 14. February: Valentine, 3rd-century Christian martyr
- 23. February: Willigis, Archbishop of Mainz and statesman of the Holy Roman Empire
- 27. April: Peter Canisius, Jesuit priest who supported the Catholic faith during the Protestant Reformation in Germany
- 15. May: Rupert of Bingen, patron saint of pilgrims
- 2. June: Marcellinus and Peter, 4th-century Christian martyrs in Rome
- 5. June: Boniface, leading figure in the Anglo-Saxon mission to the German parts of the Frankish Empire.
- 10. June: Bardo of Mainz, presided over the Synod of Mainz in 1049, which denounced simony and priestly marriage
- 21. June: Alban of Mainz, priest, missionary, and martyr.
- 27. June: Creszenz, Aureus, Theonest saints venerated by the Church of Mainz
- 4. July: anniversary of the consecration of Mainz Cathedral
- 16. August: Roch, Christian saint, confessor, specially invoked against the plague
- 6. September: Anniversary of the consecration of churches who do not know the day of their consecration
- 17. September: Hildegard of Bingen, writer, composer, philosopher, Christian mystic, Benedictine abbess, visionary, and polymath.
- 28. September: Leoba, Anglo-Saxon nun who was part of Boniface's mission to the Germans
- 16. October: Lullus, first permanent archbishop of Mainz, succeeding Saint Boniface
- 26. October: Amandus of Straßburg, confessor, first bishop of Straßburg.
- 29. October: Ferrutius, Roman soldier, martyr in Mogontiacum
- 11. November: Martin of Tours, soldier, later Bishop of Tours
- 27. November: Bilihildis, Frankish noblewoman, founder and abbess of the monastery of Altmünster near Mainz

== List of Bishops ==
- Joseph Ludwig Colmar (1802–1818)
- Joseph Vitus Burg (1829–1833)
- Johann Jakob Humann (1833–1834)
- Petrus Leopold Kaiser (1834–1848)
- Wilhelm Emmanuel Freiherr von Ketteler (1850–1877)
- sede vacante (1877–1886)
- Paul Leopold Haffner (1886–1899)
- Heinrich Brück (1900–1903)
- Georg Heinrich Kirstein (1903–1921)
- Ludwig Maria Hugo (1921–1935)
- Albert Stohr (1935–1961)
- Hermann Cardinal Volk (1962–1982)
- Karl Cardinal Lehmann (1983–2016)
- Peter Kohlgraf (2017– ...)

=== Auxiliary bishops ===
- Joseph Maria Reuß (Reuss) (1954–1978)
- Wolfgang Rolly (1972–2003)
- Franziskus Eisenbach (1988–2002)
- Werner Guballa (2003–2012)
- Ulrich Neymeyr (2003–2014)
- Udo Markus Bentz (2015– 2024)
- Joshy George Pottackal OCarm (2026-)

== See also ==
- List of Catholic dioceses in Germany

== Sources and external links ==
- GCatholic
- Herbermann, Charles, ed. (1913). "Mainz" . Catholic Encyclopedia. New York: Robert Appleton Company.

Literature

- Stefan Burkhardt, Mit Stab und Schwert. Bilder, Träger und Funktionen erzbischöflicher Herrschaft zur Zeit Kaiser Friedrich Barbarossas. Die Erzbistümer Köln und Mainz im Vergleich. Thorbecke, Ostfildern, 2008
- Friedhelm Jürgensmeier: Das Bistum Mainz. Von der Römerzeit bis zum II. Vatikanischen Konzil, Knecht Verlag, Frankfurt am Main, 1988, ISBN 3-7820-0570-8
- Hans Werner Nopper, Die vorbonifatianischen Mainzer Bischöfe. Mülheim, 2001
- Franz Usinger, Das Bistum Mainz unter französischer Herrschaft (1798–1814). Falk, Mainz, 1911
