= Ludwig Maria Hugo =

German Roman Catholic clergyman

- Bishop of Mainz
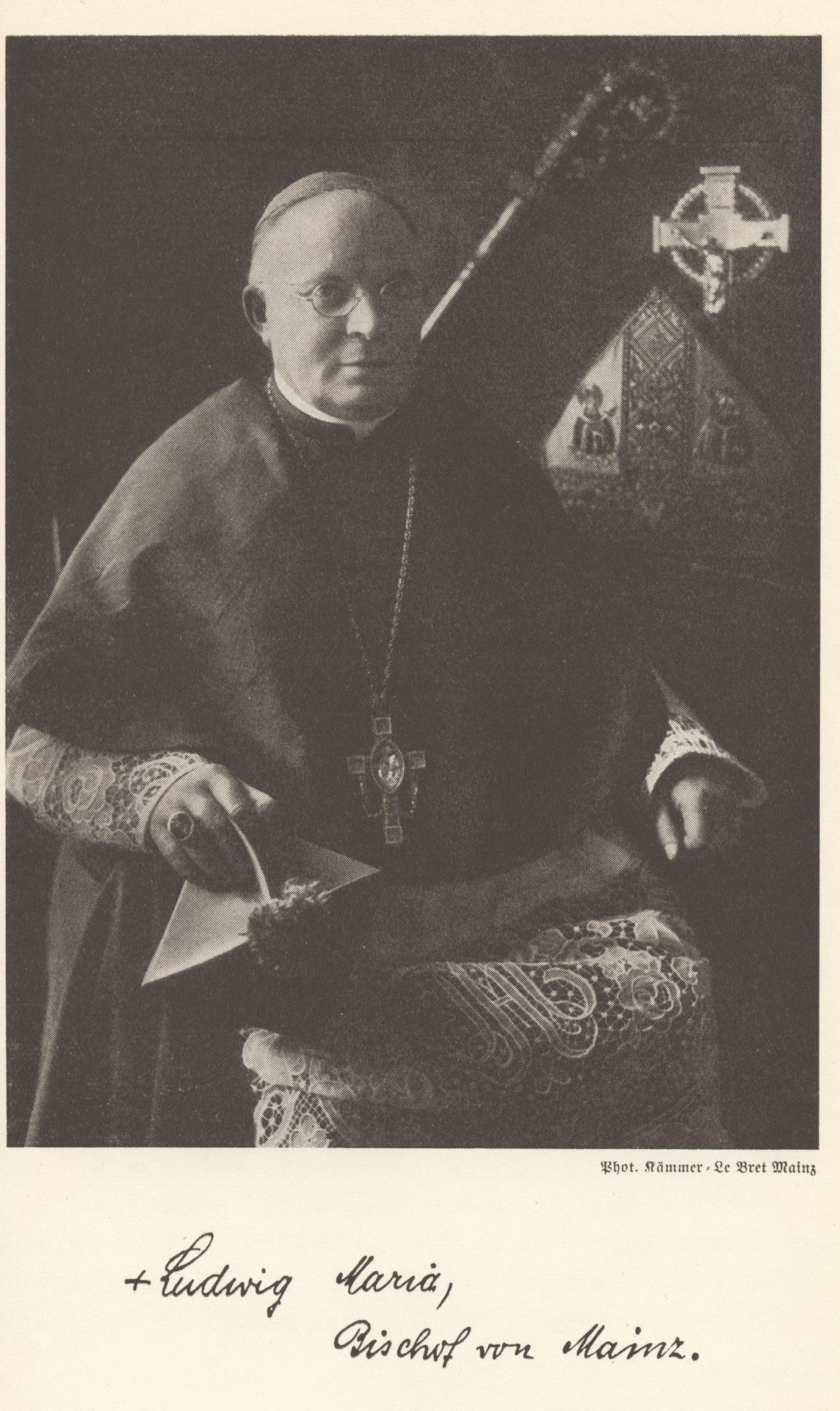
- Ludwig Maria Hugo c. 1930
- Church: Catholic Church
- Diocese: Diocese of Mainz
- In office: 15 April 1921 – 30 March 1935
- Predecessor: Georg Heinrich Kirstein
- Successor: Albert Stohr
- Previous posts: Titular Bishop of Bubastis (1921); Coadjutor Bishop of Mainz (1921)

Orders
- Ordination: 28 October 1894
- Consecration: 10 April 1921 by Ludwig Sebastian

Personal details
- Born: 19 January 1871 Landau in der Pfalz, Kingdom of Bavaria, German Empire
- Died: 30 March 1935 (aged 64) Mainz, People's State of Hesse, German Reich
- Coat of arms

Ludwig Maria Hugo (19 January 1871, Arzheim district, Landau in der Pfalz – 30 March 1935, Mainz) was a German Roman Catholic clergyman. From 1921 until his death he was Bishop of Mainz.
