= Karl Lehmann =

Catholic clergyman

His Eminence Karl Lehmann
- Cardinal, Bishop of Mainz
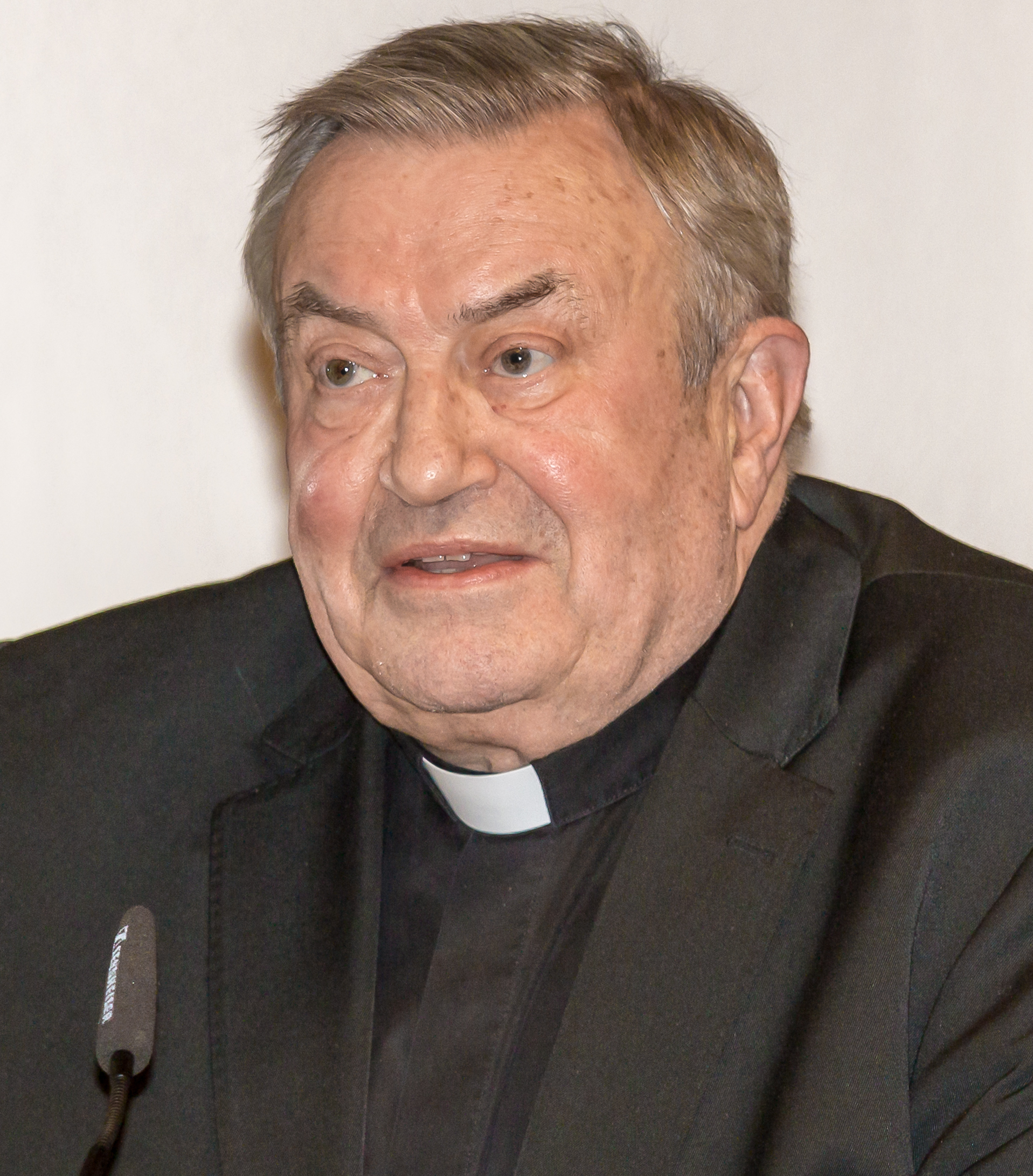
- Cardinal Lehmann, 2014
- Church: Catholic Church
- Province: Freiburg im Breisgau
- Diocese: Mainz
- Appointed: 21 June 1983
- Installed: 2 October 1983
- Term ended: 16 May 2016
- Predecessor: Hermann Volk
- Successor: Peter Kohlgraf
- Other post: Cardinal-Priest of S. Leone I

Orders
- Ordination: 10 October 1963 by Julius August Döpfner
- Consecration: 2 October 1983 by Hermann Volk
- Created cardinal: 21 February 2001 by John Paul II
- Rank: Cardinal priest

Personal details
- Born: 16 May 1936 Sigmaringen, Germany
- Died: 11 March 2018 (aged 81) Mainz, Germany
- Denomination: Roman Catholic
- Motto: State in fide (English: "Stand firmly in the faith") – 1 Corinthians 16:13
- Coat of arms: Karl Lehmann's coat of arms

Karl Lehmann (16 May 1936 – 11 March 2018) was a German prelate and cardinal of the Catholic Church. He served as Bishop of Mainz from 1983 to 2016, being elevated to the cardinalate in 2001.

He served as chairman of the Conference of the German Bishops from 1987 to 2008, being considered one of the most influential prelates in Germany in those years and a leading proponent of liberal stances within the Church. Before he became a bishop, he worked as professor of theology at the University of Mainz and the University of Freiburg.

== Early years, education and career as theological scholar ==
Lehmann was born in Sigmaringen and grew up in Veringenstadt. His father was a local teacher and his mother educated as a bookseller. During his high school years, he lived in the Catholic student home Erzbischöfliches Studienheim St. Fidelis in Sigmaringen.

He studied at the Seminary of Freiburg from 1957 to 1964 and then at the Pontifical Gregorian University in Rome where he earned a doctorate in philosophy, in 1962, with a thesis titled Vom Ursprung und Sinn der Seinsfrage im Denken Martin Heideggers. He also received a doctorate in theology in 1967, with a thesis titled "Auferweckt am dritten Tag nach der Schrift"—Exegetische und fundamentaltheologische Studien zu 1 Kor 15, 3b-5.

He was ordained to the priesthood on 10 October 1963 in Rome by Cardinal Julius Döpfner. During the Second Vatican Council from 1962 to 1965, he served as an assistant to Karl Rahner, and he was also assistant to Rahner at the Seminar for Christian worldview and philosophy of religion at LMU Munich from 1964 to 1967.

In 1968, he became professor of dogmatic theology at the University of Mainz, a position he held until 1971 when he became professor of dogmatic and ecumenical theology at the University of Freiburg.

He was for ten years, from 1974 to 1984, a member of the International Theological Commission.

== Bishop and cardinal ==
When he was appointed Bishop of Mainz in 1983 at the age of 47 he was the youngest Catholic bishop ever appointed in Germany.

After being elected deputy chairman of the Episcopal Conference of Germany in 1985, he was elected chairman of the conference in 1987 and held that position for 21 years until 2008, making him one of the most influential people in German Catholicism in this period.

He served as member of the Congregation for the Doctrine of the Faith from 1986 to 1998 and served as vice-president of the Council of the Bishops' Conferences of Europe from 1993 to 2001.

In 1993, Lehmann along with Bishop of Rottenburg-Stuttgart Walter Kasper and Archbishop of Freiburg Oskar Saier issued a pastoral letter that argued that there should be an opening for pastoral flexibility on allowing divorced and civilly remarried persons to receive the Eucharist. The letter was read in the churches of their dioceses in September of that year.

Abortion was a major issue during Lehmann's term as chairman of the Conference of the German Bishops. After the German reunification abortion laws needed to be reconciled. Working closely with CDU and Helmut Kohl, Lehmann favoured a compromise where abortion remained illegal, but under certain circumstances not punishable. This became the fundament for the German legislation in the area. To obtain impunity, a woman was in most cases required to go through counseling before abortion and the Church would for a time offer such counseling. In 1998 Pope John Paul II, against the wish of Lehmann and a majority of German bishops, banned the Church from participating in the system.

Lehmann mentioned the 1998 Katholikentag in Mainz as one of the highlights his years as bishop of the diocese.

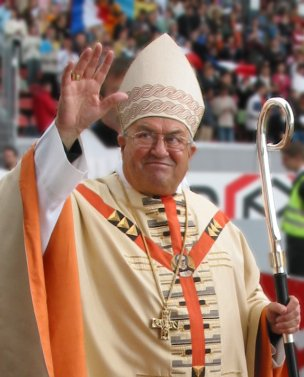
Lehmann at the closing of Tage der Begegnung, Mainz, 2005

Lehmann was raised to the rank of cardinal by Pope John Paul II at the consistory of 21 February 2001. The appointment came unexpected to many observers due to Lehmann's relatively liberal view on abortion counselling and giving eucharist to remarried parishioners. Former Chancellor of Germany Helmut Kohl, who was a friend of Lehmann, had lobbied the Vatican for the appointment. He was one of the electors who participated in the papal conclaves of 2005 and 2013 that selected Pope Benedict XVI and Pope Francis. The Titular Church of Lehmann in Rome was San Leone I.

Lehmann was among the cardinals and bishops who met annually from 1995 to 2006 in St. Gallen, Switzerland, to discuss reforms with respect to the appointment of bishops, collegiality, bishops' conferences, the primacy of the papacy and sexual morality. About a dozen in number, they differed among themselves, but shared the view that Cardinal Joseph Ratzinger was not the candidate they hoped to see elected at the next conclave.

Pope Francis accepted his resignation as Bishop of Mainz on 16 May 2016, his 80th birthday.

Being considered a leading force for a more liberal Catholicism, he was called a bridge-builder, a man of dialogue and a "stroke of luck for German Catholics" by supporters, while Conservative critics derided the "Lehmann Church" as too accommodating to modern values.

=== Coat of arms ===
Coat of arms

Cardinal Lehmann's episcopal coat of arms incorporated elements such as the wheel from the arms of the Diocese of Mainz, the key from the Diocese of Worms, and an open book with the letters Alpha and Omega, a symbol of the message of Jesus Christ, as well as for the Cardinal's personal enthusiasm for literature.

His Latin motto, State in fide (English: "Stand firmly in the faith") was derived from 1 Corinthians 16:13.

== Later years ==
His last public appearance was in August 2017 at the consecration of Peter Kohlgraf as new bishop of Mainz.

In September 2017, Lehmann suffered a stroke and cerebral hemorrhage which left him in need of care, first at hospital and later at home. He died on 11 March 2018.

Chancellor of Germany Angela Merkel expressed sorrow at his death and referred to him as one of the most prominent figures of the Catholic Church in Germany. The chairman of the German Bishops' Conference Reinhard Marx paid respect to Lehmann as a man who had influenced the Catholic Church globally.

== Honors and awards ==
- 2000 Order of Merit of the Federal Republic of Germany (Verdienstorden der Bundesrepublik Deutschland)
- 2002 Order of Merit of Baden-Württemberg
- 2006 Commander of the Legion of Honour
- 2009 Hessian Cultural Prize
- 2009 Order of Merit of Rhineland-Palatinate
- 2016 Martin-Luther-Medaille, awarded by the Protestant Church in Germany

Catholic Church titles
Preceded by Joseph Höffner	Chairman of the German Bishops' Conference; 1987–2008	Succeeded by Robert Zollitsch
Preceded by	Vice president of the Council of the Bishops' Conferences of Europe; 1993–2001	Succeeded by
Preceded by Hermann Volk	Bishop of Mainz; 1983–2016	Succeeded by Peter Kohlgraf
