= Mainz Cathedral =

Cathedral in Mainz, Germany

Coordinates: 49°59′56″N 8°16′26″E

Mainz
- St. Martin's Cathedral
- German: Der Hohe Dom zu Mainz
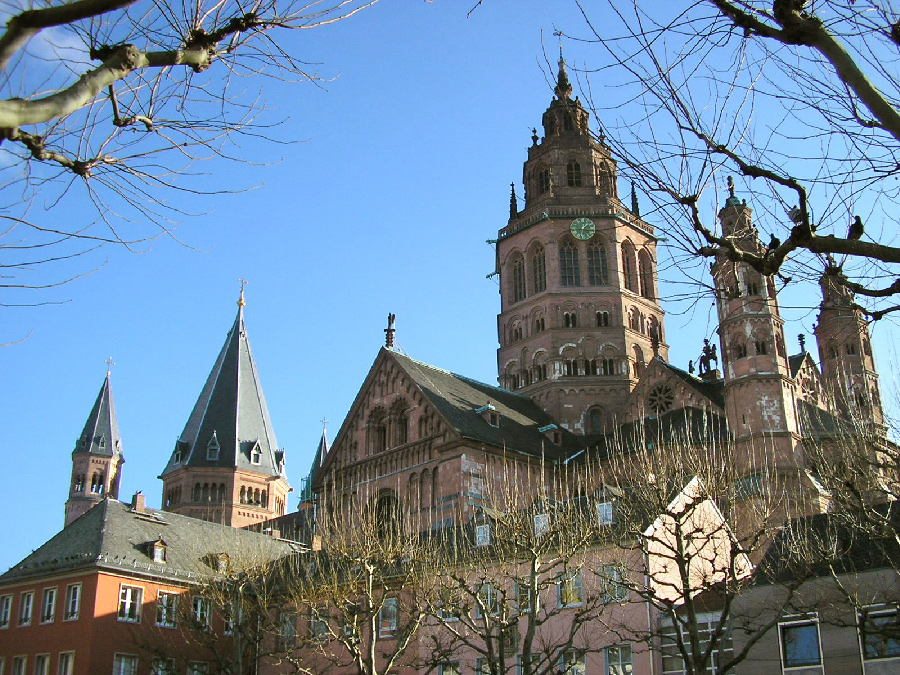
- Mainz
- Location: Mainz
- Country: Germany
- Denomination: Roman Catholic

History
- Status: Cathedral
- Founded: 975 or 976
- Dedication: Martin of Tours
- Dedicated: 29 August 1009 (1st time)

Architecture
- Functional status: Active
- Style: Romanesque (original); Gothic (chapels and bell towers); Baroque (roof)
- Years built: 975–1009

Administration
- Province: Freiburg im Breisgau
- Diocese: Mainz

Clergy
- Bishop: Peter Kohlgraf

Mainz Cathedral or St. Martin's Cathedral (German: Mainzer Dom, Martinsdom or, officially, Der Hohe Dom zu Mainz) is located near the historical center and pedestrianized market square of the city of Mainz, Germany. This 1000-year-old Roman Catholic cathedral is the site of the episcopal see of the Bishop of Mainz.

Mainz Cathedral is predominantly Romanesque in style, but later exterior additions over many centuries have resulted in the appearance of various architectural influences seen today. It comprises three aisles and stands under the patronage of Saint Martin of Tours. The eastern quire is dedicated to Saint Stephen.

The interior of the cathedral houses tombs and funerary monuments of former powerful Electoral-prince-archbishops, or Kurfürst-Erzbischöfe, of the diocese and contains religious works of art spanning a millennium. The cathedral also has a central courtyard and statues of Saint Boniface and The Madonna on its grounds.

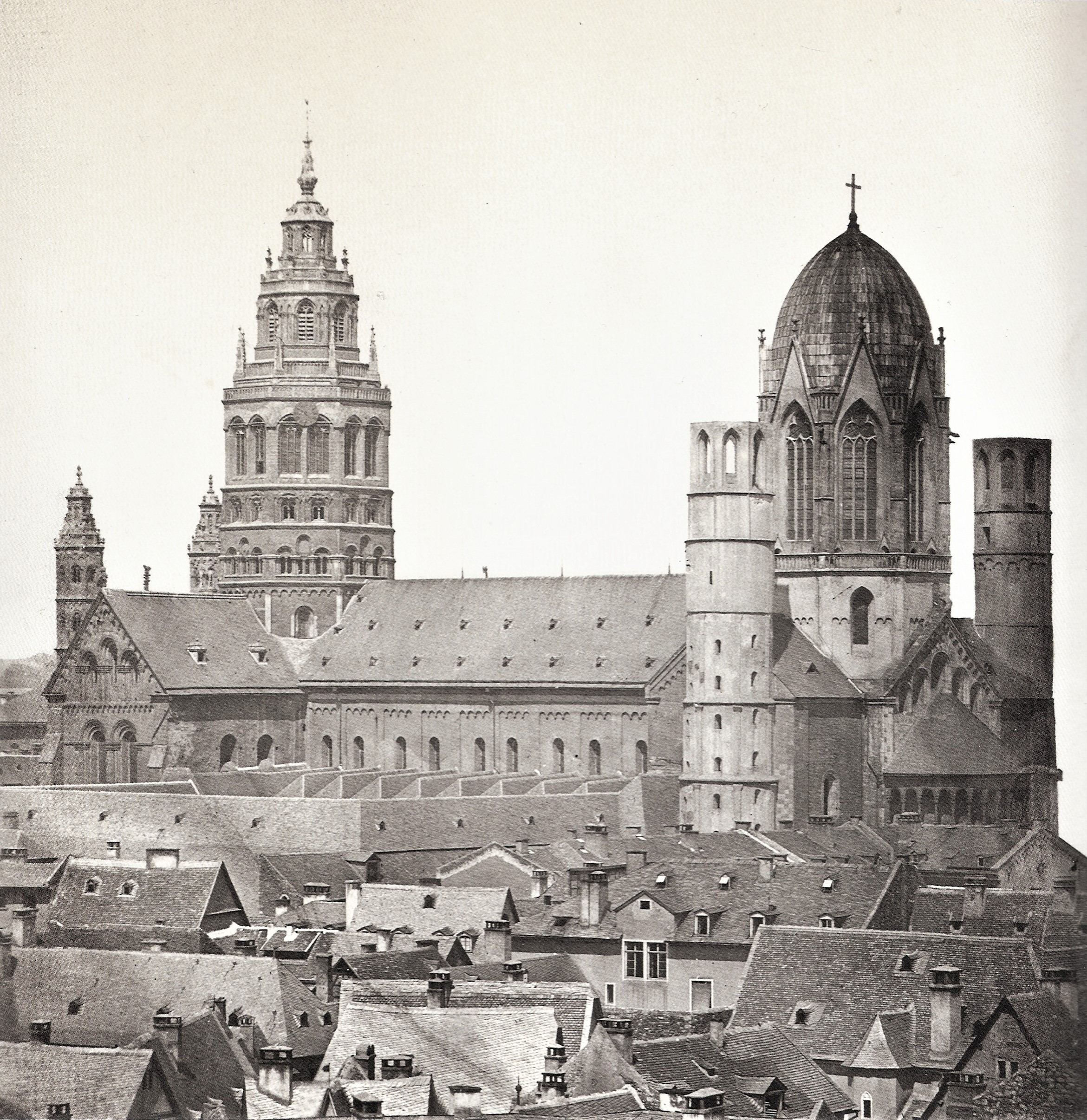
Mainz Cathedral c. 1855

During the time of Mainz Archbishop Willigis (975–1011), the city of Mainz flourished economically, and Willigis became one of the most influential politicians of that time, ascending to regent of the empire between 991 and 994. In 975–976 shortly after his installation he ordered the construction of a new cathedral in the pre-Romanesque Ottonian architecture style. This new building was part of his vision of Mainz as the "second Rome".

This new cathedral was to take over the functions of two churches: the old cathedral and St. Alban's, which was the largest church in the area, belonging to a Benedictine abbey and serving as the burial ground for the bishops and other nobles, including Fastrada, a spouse of Charlemagne. Most of the synods and other important meetings were held at St. Alban's Abbey.

The new cathedral consisted of a double chancel with two transepts. The main hall was built in the typical triple-nave "cross" pattern. As was usual at that time no vault was included because of structural difficulties relating to the size of the building. Six towers rose from the church. A cloister was enclosed in the structure and a small freestanding church, St. Mary's Church, connected by a colonnade. This small church developed later into the collegiate church of St. Maria ad Gradus.

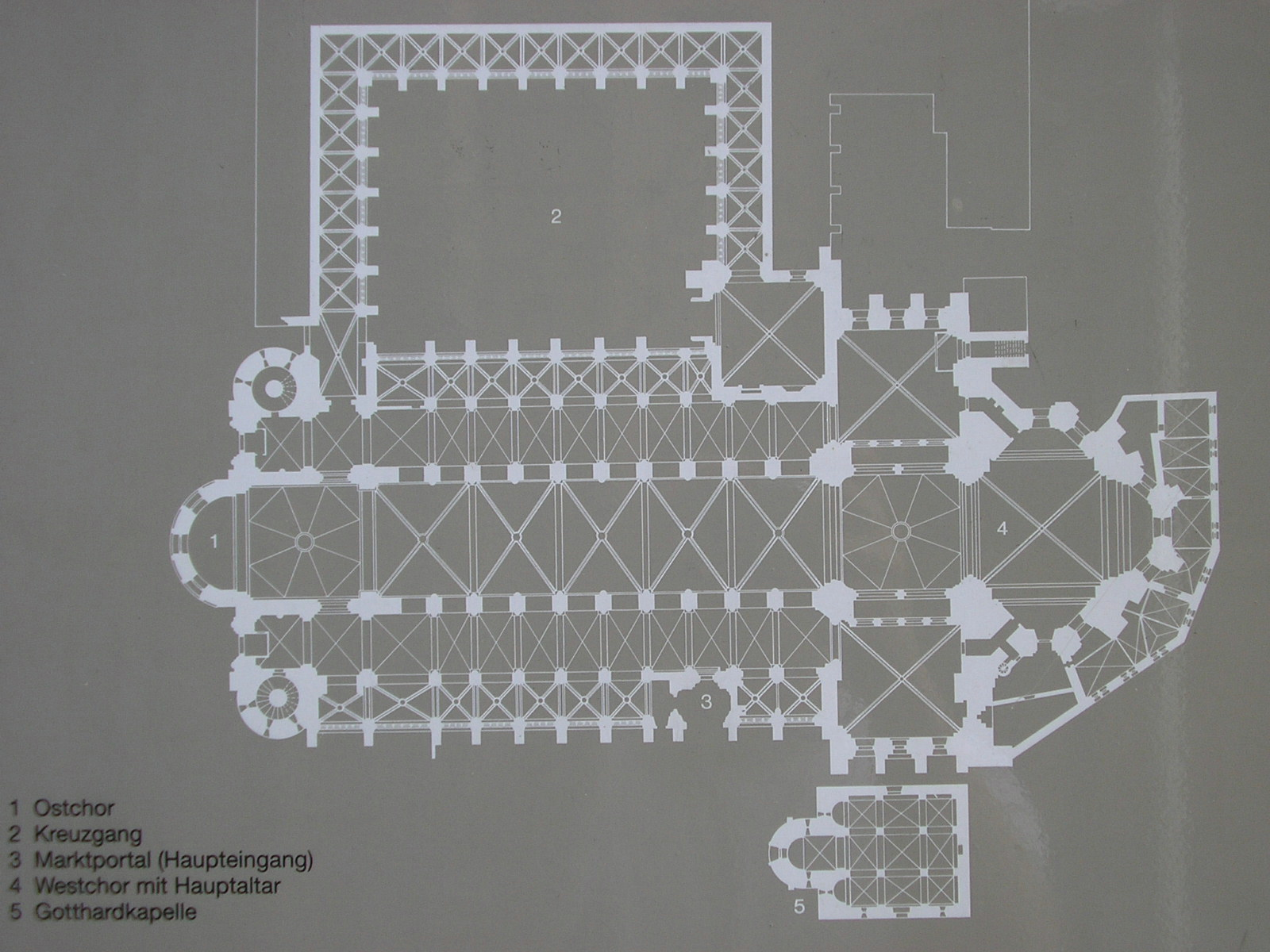
Present-day floor plan of the cathedral (↑S)

Sandstone was used as the primary building material for the cathedral. The inside was plastered white under the Archbishop Bardo, probably in the middle of the 11th century. During renovations ordered by Henry IV in the late 11th century, much of the outside was also plastered, but the cornices were left exposed in their original red and yellow. It is believed that the coloring of the cathedral was changed on a number of occasions, but no further documentation of the coloring is available until records of the Baroque works.

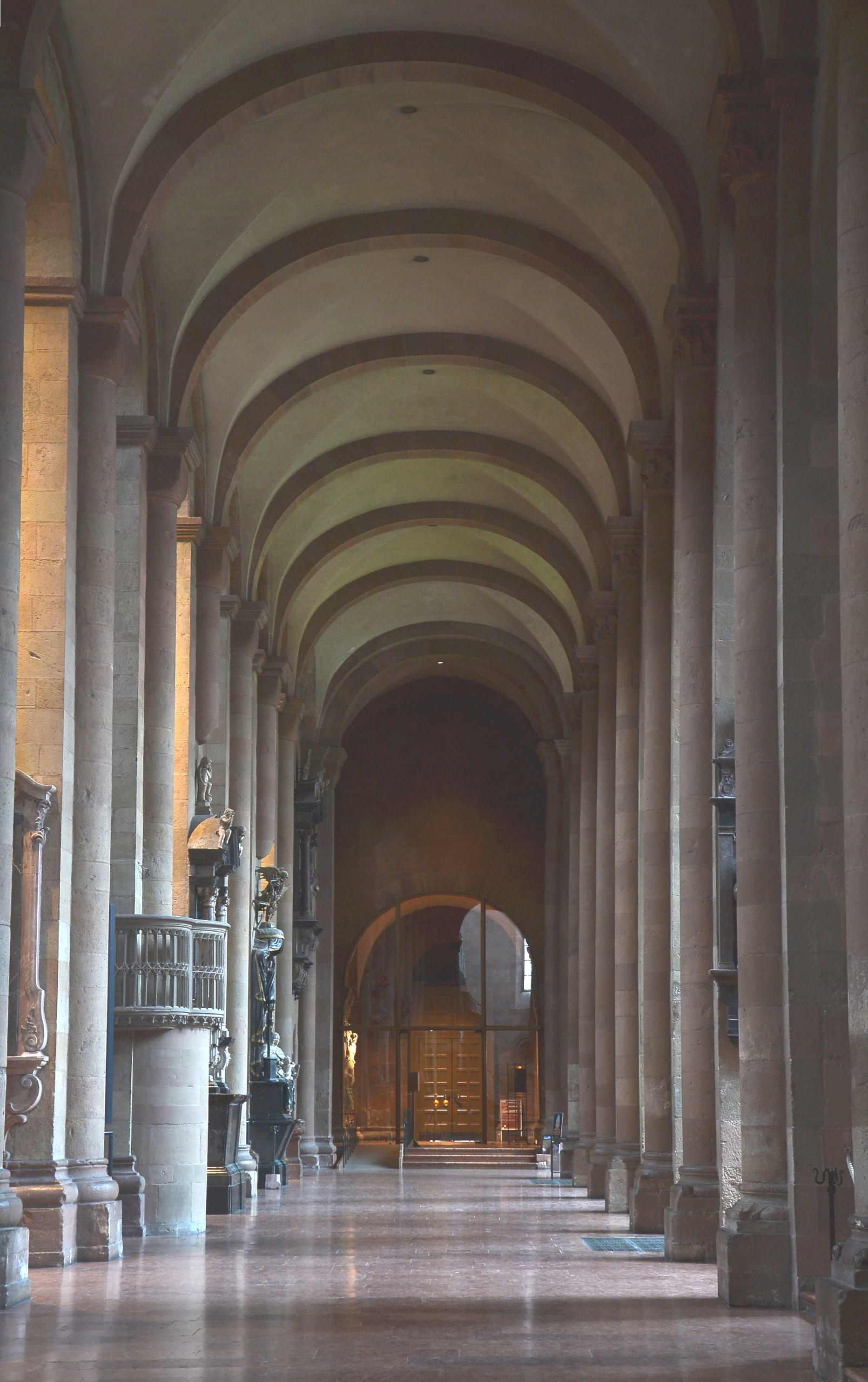
South aisle

The cathedral suffered extensive damage from a fire on the day of its inauguration in 1009. Archbishop Bardo (Bardo of Oppershofen) presided over the completion of the cathedral begun under Willigis. By 1036 the main portions of the body of Mainz Cathedral were complete. Willigis was buried in the second church he had initiated, St. Stephan's, in 1011.

== The two chancels ==
From the ninth to 12th century, several important churches in the Holy Roman Empire were built with choirs on both ends. One of the first was Cologne Cathedral of 855 ("Hildebold's Cathedral"). One of the oldest preserved examples is St. Michael's Church, Hildesheim, erected since 1010. Gernrode Abbey church was added a second choir, in the 12th century. This type of footplans also was acquired in Poland (Tum Collegiate Church) and Hungary (Pécs Cathedral). The reason for building two chancels is not entirely clear. Many scholars suggest that there is some symbolic significance, such as empire and church, or body and spirit, but no irrefutable evidence for these theories exists. Others claim that the construction has a functional purpose for ceremonial processions. Whatever the original intent of the double chancel, the eastern chancel came to serve as the location for the mass and the western chancel was reserved for the bishop and pontiffs.

=== Bardo's western chancel ===
In most cathedrals at the time, the main chancel lay on the east side. Willigis, however, designed his cathedral with the main chancel on the west, presumably modeled after the great basilicas in Rome, which were constructed this way. (Willigis's design bore a striking resemblance to Old St. Peter's Basilica.)

The chancel was badly damaged in the fire of 1009, and remained that way under Archbishops Erkanbald and Aribo. The chancel was finally reconstructed under Bardo. He then buried his predecessor Aribo there, before the rest of the cathedral was even finished. (Willigis's remains are not, as sometimes believed, in Mainz Cathedral; he was buried in his second construction project, St. Stephen's.)

=== Henry IV's eastern chancel ===
In 1081, fire once again struck the cathedral, and the appearance of the Salian western end is not known. In 1100, Henry IV ordered reconstruction in the old Lombardic style. The old flat chancel end on the east side was replaced with a large apse, which external gallery with a narrow arcade supported by short columns crowned the semicircular wall with a wide pseudo arcade and tall pilasters on both sides. The new chancel had a triple-nave crypt. The damaged square tower had been replaced with an octagonal dome, above which an octagonal tower was added later. Flanking stair turrets remained from the first cathedral. These changes closely resembled the renovations Henry had overseen on Speyer Cathedral a few years earlier.

Henry also undertook a few other minor changes, such as raising the transept on the east side and adding openings at the column level. These column-level portals were among the first ever such constructed.

Henry died in 1106, before his intended changes were complete. With his death, the funding for the renovation of the cathedral dried up and so the remaining construction was abandoned. Mainz Cathedral is considered one of the three Kaiserdome ("Emperor's Cathedrals") of the Holy Roman (German) Empire, along with Worms Cathedral and Speyer Cathedral.

=== Evolution of the main nave ===
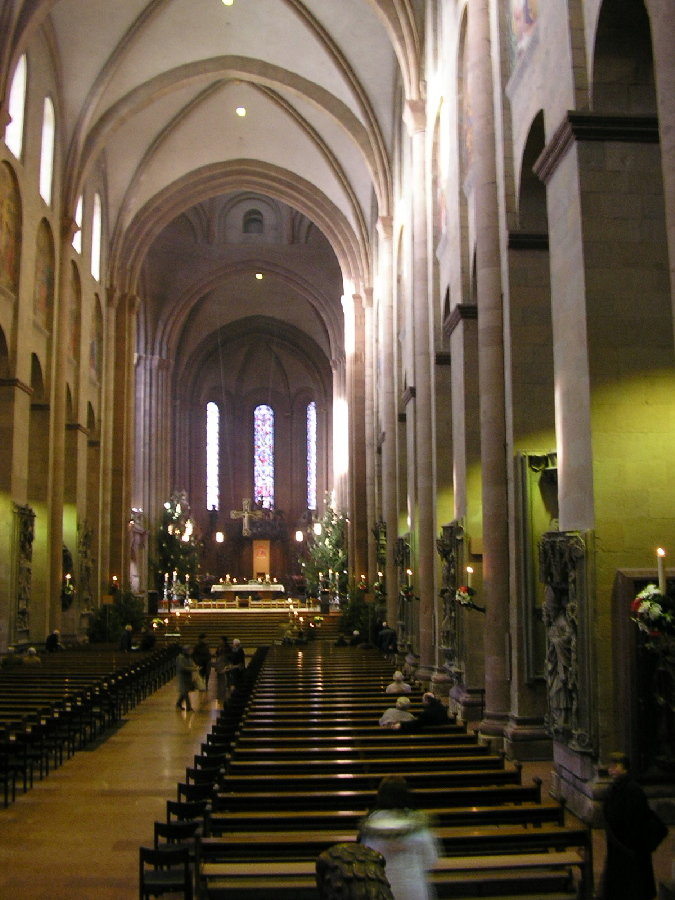
The main nave of the cathedral

Archbishop Adalbert I of Saarbrücken (1110–1137) had a two-story chapel, called the Gotthard Chapel, built as the official palace chapel next to the cathedral. It is believed that he also ordered the renovation of the main body of the cathedral, mainly due to similarities between the main hall and the vault of the new chapel.

Conception for the renovations was again taken from the Romanesque Speyer Cathedral. This time, however, without money from the emperor, the builders lacked the resources to acquire the high-quality sandstone used in Henry's additions. They instead used limestone. The other aspects of the renovations were also much cheaper, and the extravagant style of Speyer Cathedral was largely avoided.

The central nave was built to 28 m (92 ft), 5 m (16 ft) short of Speyer Cathedral's 33 m (108 ft). It seems that the blind arches were intended to encompass the windows, as in Speyer Cathedral, but the height of the roof did not allow this. The resulting three-level effect, due to the arches ending before the windows, was a technique not before seen in architecture.

The main hall was further renovated throughout the entire 12th century. The entire outer wall structure was eventually replaced. Around the year 1200, the ceiling was replaced with a ribbed vault, a rather new technique for the time.

=== Additional renovations ===
Around the time that the ribbed vault was installed it was decided to renovate the western half of the cathedral, which had stayed relatively unchanged since Willigis' construction. In contrast to the eastern renovations done earlier, which were in a high-Romanesque style, these new changes were carried out in a late Romanesque style. A new vault was added to span the north and south arms of the transept. Large windows were added to the wall separating the transept from the main hall. The large dome connecting the transept to the main hall was decorated with friezes and pillars.

Three small apses and two very large pillars were added to support the small flank towers. Pediments were added to the three open sides of the chancel. In general, the western section of the cathedral was extensively decorated to keep up with the newly renovated eastern section.

== Post-Romanesque building and renovation ==
Already at the time of renovations on the western segment of the cathedral, new architectural styles were being ushered in. This included Gothic additions and, later, Baroque pieces as well.

=== Gothic additions ===
The first post-Romanesque addition to the cathedral was the western rood screen. This was done in the Gothic style at the time of the western renovations. Following this example, the intersect area was heavily renovated in the next few centuries in the Gothic style.

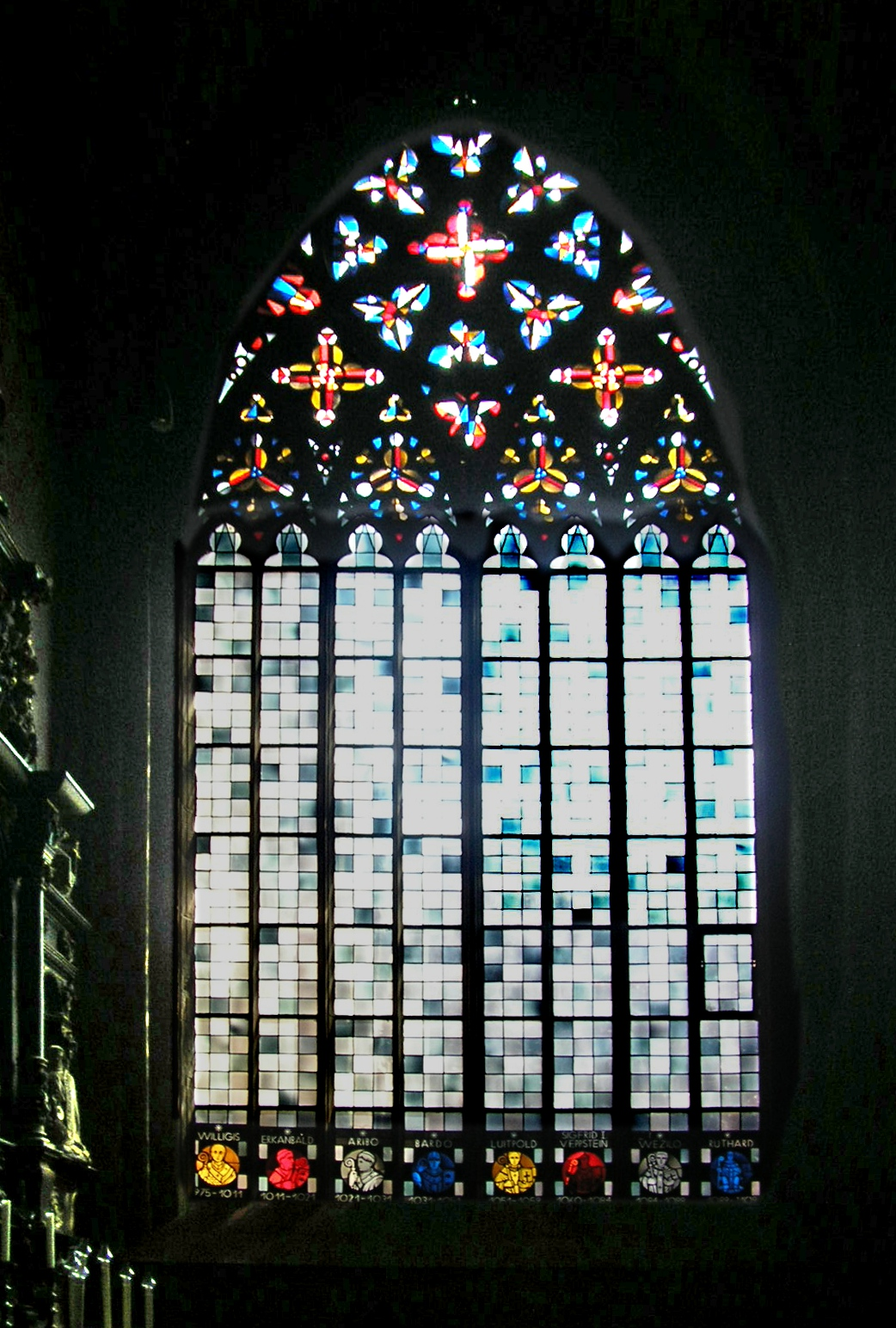
A Gothic window in the cathedral

Starting in 1279, Gothic chapels featuring large decorative windows were built onto the cathedral. In 1418 the Nassauer Chapel, a freestanding burial chapel in the middle nave was built at the request of Archbishop John II of Nassau. The construction of this chapel is attributed to Madern Gerthener, who was also responsible for the Memorial Chapel built into the entrance hall to the western wing of the intersect area.

The towers were also renovated during this period. Belfries were added to the two towers at the crossings, on the eastern tower in 1361 and on the western in 1418. These towers were topped with Gothic-style pyramid roofs. (These towers turned out to be so heavy that the eastern tower had to be supported by a pillar erected in 1430.)

The cloister was heavily renovated and the Liebfrauenkirche was completely replaced at this time, marking the last of the Gothic renovations to the building. The roof on the eastern tower, however, was replaced in 1579 by a flatter one due to weight concerns. After that, no major alterations were made to the cathedral for almost two centuries.

=== Baroque additions ===
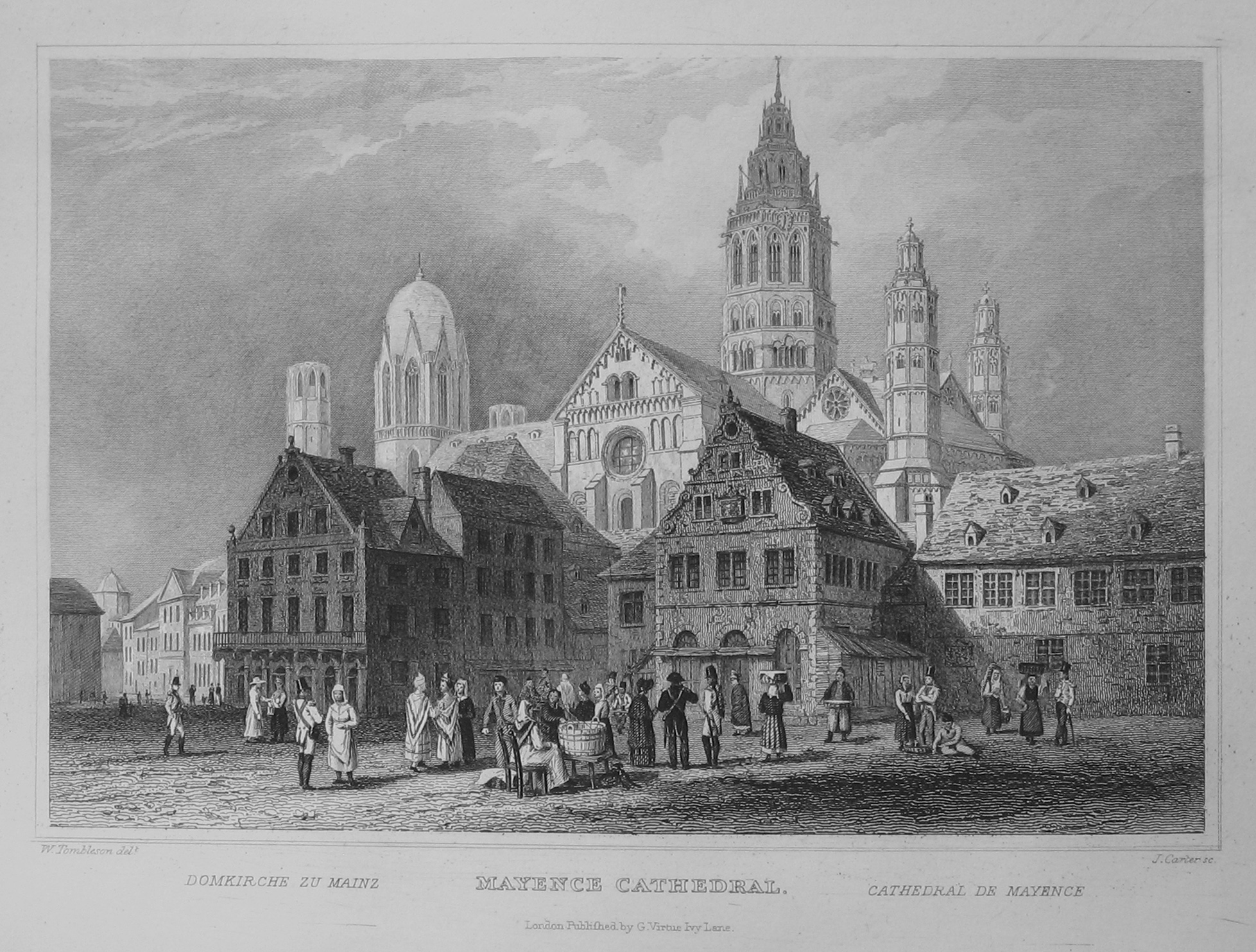
Mainz Cathedral (c. 1840)

In 1767 the western cross-tower was struck by lightning and its roof was destroyed. In 1769 the engineer Franz Ignaz Michael Neumann designed a new multi-story roof for the tower. All the towers in the western wing were roofed with this new Baroque stone design, although care was taken to preserve the previous styles as well. The pinnacles of the pediments on the chapels were replaced with urn-like structures. The famed weathervane, called the Domsgickel, was added at this time as well.

The inside of the cathedral was heavily whitewashed. A statue of St. Martin and the Beggar was erected on the roof of the western chancel in 1769.

=== 19th-century reconstruction ===
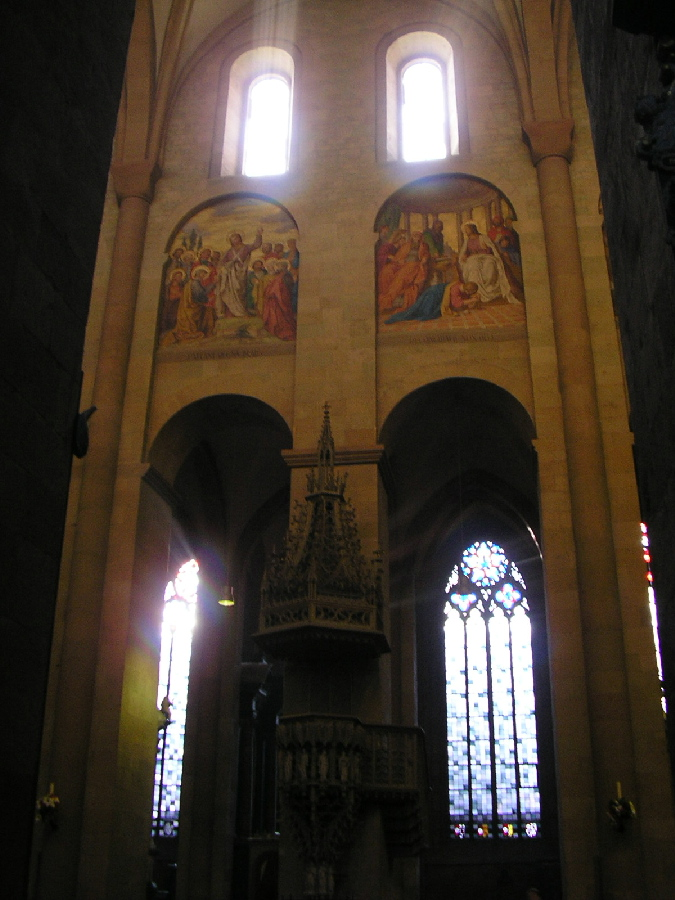
The pulpit in Mainz cathedral

The Archbishopric of Mainz suffered heavily in the late 18th century. Following the invasion by French revolutionary troops in 1792, Mainz came under attack from Prussian troops in 1793 in the siege that led to the end of the Republic of Mainz. This attack damaged large portions of the cathedral, particularly the east wing, the cloister, and the Liebfrauenkirche, which was demolished in 1803 (the year after Mainz lost its archbishopric and became a regular diocese). The cathedral was used as an army camp for several years, and therefore large amounts of the cathedral's artefacts were sold, the wooden interior was burned for heat.

Bishop Joseph Ludwig Colmar (1802–1818), with support from Napoleon, set into motion restoration efforts. These efforts were interrupted by quartering needs for the French Army in 1813, and the cathedral was used as a church in 1814 for the first time in eleven years. By 1831, the reparations had been for the most part completed. The major change to the building was an iron cupola on the main eastern tower built by architect Georg Moller. But this cupola was removed in 1870 because it was too heavy.

After that, Pierre Cuypers undertook a lengthy restoration work. The support pillar in the eastern cross-tower was removed, as the heavy belfry no longer stood. The crypt in the eastern chancel was rebuilt, but not to the original specifications of the one built by Henry IV. At the conclusion of these reconstructions, a neo-Romanesque tower was erected in place of the eastern cross-tower in 1875.

At this time the cathedral was once again repainted. Large and colorful Nazarene movement murals, including some by Philipp Veit, were painted to decorate the inside of the cathedral.

=== 20th century restorations ===
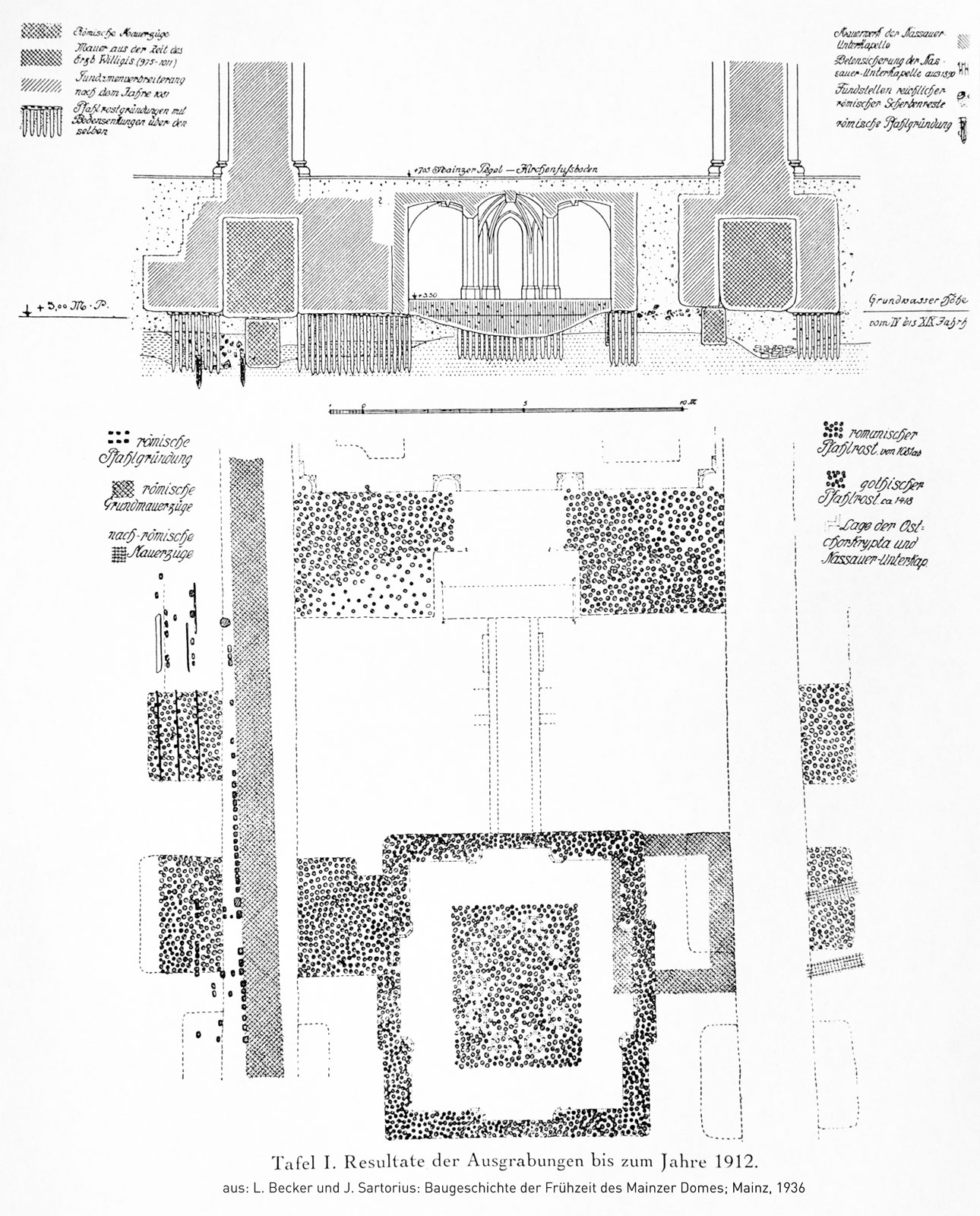
On-site findings of the excavation until 1912. The plan shows the position of the foundation around the underground "House of Nassau" burial chapel: cross-section and floor plan. The plan had been drawn by the architect of Mainz cathedral Ludwig Becker (1855–1940).

Conservation efforts began in the 1900s to save the cathedral from further damage. After a lowering of the groundwater, the wooden substructures became rotten and the foundations started to fail and needed to be replaced. Beginning in 1909 the old foundations were underpinned. Works stopped in 1916 due to World War I. Between 1924 and 1928 the fundaments were completely reinforced by a new fundament made of concrete. Concrete and steel were used to anchor the towers and main vault.

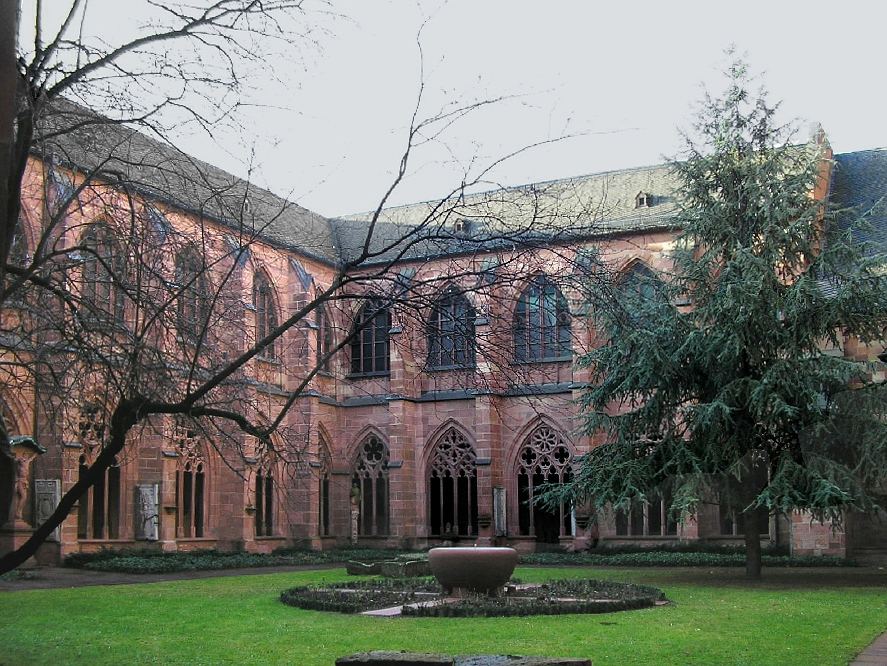
The cloister in Mainz Cathedral

A new floor, made of red marble, was constructed in this period. Architect Paul Meyer-Speer engineered a system to modify the inner walls with colorful sandstone, removing most of the paintings by Veit and restoring a look similar to the original Willigis-Bardo construction. Unfortunately this system did not withstand continuing restoration efforts, and by 1959 most of the color was gone.

In World War II, Mainz was a target of Allied bombing multiple times. The cathedral was hit several times in August 1942. Most of the roofs burned, and the top level of the cloister was destroyed. The vault, however, withstood the attacks and remained intact. The damaged elements were restored as authentically as possible, a process which continued well into the 1970s. In addition, much of the glass in the cathedral was replaced.

The outside of the cathedral was colored red to match the historical buildings of Mainz. In addition, extensive cleaning and restoration efforts were undertaken, ending in 1975. In that year, the thousandth year since the beginning of the cathedral's construction was celebrated.

In 2001, new efforts were begun to restore the cathedral both inside and outside. They were expected to take from ten to fifteen years.

In 2004, two large windows by the renowned glass artist Johannes Schreiter, were installed.

== Emperors and the cathedral ==
When Mainz was an archbishopric, the cathedral was the official seat of the archdiocese. In 1184 Emperor Barbarossa celebrated the accolade of his sons in the cathedral. The feast of 1184 on the Maaraue, the Diet of Pentecost, became legendary in history as the greatest feast of the Middle Ages. It was from this cathedral that Frederick Barbarossa, the Holy Roman Emperor of the time, officially announced his support for the Third Crusade during the Curia Christi of 27 March 1188.

During the Middle Ages, the right to crown German kings (and queens) was given to the Archbishop of Mainz. The crowning in Mainz awarded the monarch the kingdom of Germany, and a subsequent in Rome granted him the Holy Roman Empire (a nominal difference only). Because the cathedral was damaged several times, many crownings were not held there.

The following monarchs were crowned in Mainz Cathedral:

- Conrad II on 8 September 1024 by Archbishop Aribo
- Agnes de Poitou in 1043 by Archbishop Bardo
- Rudolf of Rheinfelden (anti-king) on 26 March or 7 April 1077 by Siegfried I
- Matilda (later wife of Henry V), on 25 July 1110 by Frederick I, Archbishop of Cologne
- Philip of Swabia on 8 September 1198 by Bishop Aimo of Tarantaise
- Frederick II on 9 December 1212 by Siegfried II of Eppstein
- Heinrich Raspe on 22 May 1246 by Siegfried III of Eppstein

== Burials ==
- Bardo (archbishop)
- Wezilo
- Marianus Scotus
- Bertold von Henneberg
- Johannes Gutenberg

== See also ==
- High medieval domes

== Sources ==
- Wilhelm Jung: Mainz Cathedral; Translation: Margaret Marks, Editor: Schnell und Steiner, Regensburg, 1994
- Ron Baxter: "The tombs of the archbishops of Mainz", in Ute Engel and Alexandra Gajewski (eds), Mainz and the Middle Rhine Valley. British Archaeological Assoc. Conference Transactions, 30, Leeds, British Archaeological Association and Maney Publishing. ISBN 978-1-904350-83-5, 2007, pp. 68–79.

The German article references the following sources:

- Die Bischofskirche St. Martin zu Mainz, ed.: Friedhelm Jürgensmeier, Knecht Publishers, Frankfurt/Main 1986
- Lebendiger Dom – St. Martin zu Mainz in Geschichte und Gegenwart, ed.: Barbara Nichtweiß, Philipp v. Zabern Publishers, Mainz 1998
- Der Dom zu Mainz – Geschichte und Beschreibung des Baues und seiner Wiederherstellung, Friedrich Schneider, Publishers Ernst and Korn, Berlin, 1886
- Der Dom zu Mainz – Ein Handbuch, August Schuchert, Wilhelm Jung, Verlag Druckhaus Schmidt & Bödige GmbH, 3rd Edition, Mainz, 1984
- Deutsche Romanik, Bernhard Schütz, Wolfgang Müller; Herder Publishers, Freiburg i. Br. 1989
- Mainz – Die Geschichte der Stadt, editors: Franz Dumont, Ferdinand Scherf, Friedrich Schütz; 2nd ed.; Publisher: Philipp von Zabern, Mainz 1999

Additional (web) sources for the article include:

- Mainz Online: Cathedral (extended history of the cathedral)
- Diocese of Mainz: Cathedral (another history of the cathedral; in German)
- Cathedral Museum Mainz (documentation of artefacts in the cathedral; in German)
- Terce (= Mid-Morning Prayer) and Pontifical High Mass in Mainz Cathedral – Pentecost 2015 with Karl Cardinal Lehmann
