= List of bishops and archbishops of Mainz =

Title of the archbishop and ruling prince of the Electorate of Mainz

The Diocese of Mainz was governed by bishops until 745 when it was elevated in rank to an archbishopric. By the 10th century, the archbishops had secular jurisdiction over a territory of the Holy Roman Empire. This was the future Electorate of Mainz. From the 13th century, the archbishops were first in precedence among the prince-electors of the empire and ex officio archchancellor. Their secular and spiritual jurisdictions, however, did not coincide geographically.

In church hierarchy, the archbishop of Mainz was the primas Germaniae.

== Bishops and archbishops ==
=== Legendary bishops before 350 ===
- Crescens c. 80–103
- Marinus c. 103–109
- St. Crescentius c. 109–127
- Cyriacus c. 127–141
- Hilarius c. 141–161
- Martin I c. 161–175
- Celsus c. 175–197
- Lucius c. 197–207
- Gotthard c. 207–222
- Sophron c. 222–230
- Heriger I c. 230–234
- Ruther c. 234–254
- Avitus c. 254–276
- Ignatius c. 276–289
- Dionysius c. 289–309
- Ruprecht I c. 309–321
- Adalhard c. 320s
- Lucius Annaeus c. 330s

=== Bishops, c. 350–745 ===
- Martin II c. 350 – c. 360s
- Sidonius I c. late 360s – c. 386
- Sigismund c. 386 – c. 392
- Theonistus or Thaumastus
- Maximus
- Lupold c. 392 – c. 409
- Nicetas c. 409 – c. 417
- Marianus c. 417 – c. 427
- Aureus c. 427 – c. 443
- Eutropius c. 443 – c. 467
- Adalbald
- Nather
- Adalbert (I)
- Lantfried
- Sidonius II ? – c. 589
- Siegbert I c. 589–610
- Ludegast c. 610–615
- Rudwald c. 615
- Lubald ? fl. c. 625
- Rigibert 708-724
- Gerold 724–743
- Gewilip c. 744 – c. 745

=== Archbishops, 745–1251 ===
- Saint Boniface 745–754
- Lullus 754–786 (First archbishop)
- Richholf 787–813
- Haistulph 813–826
- Odgar 826–847
- Rabanus Maurus 848–856
- Karl 856–863
- Ludbert 863–889
- Sunderhold 889–891
- Hatto I 891–913
- Herigar 913–927
- Hildebert 927-937
- Frederick 937–954
- William 954–968
- Hatto II 968–970
- Rudbrecht 970–975
- Willigis 975–1011
- Erkanbald 1011–1021
- Aribo 1021–1031
- Bardo 1031–1051
- Luitpold 1051–1059
- Siegfried I 1060–1084
- Wezilo 1084–1088
- Rudhart 1088–1109
- Adalbert I von Saarbrücken 1111–1137
- Adalbert II von Saarbrücken 1138–1141
- Markholf 1141–1142
- Henry I 1142–1153
- Arnold von Selenhofen 1153–1160
- Christian I 1160–1161
  - Rudolf of Zähringen 1160–1161 (opposing)
- Conrad I of Wittelsbach 1161–1165
- Christian I 1165–1183
- Conrad I of Wittelsbach (restored) 1183–1200
- Luitpold von Scheinfeld 1200–1208
- Sigfried II von Eppstein 1200–1230 (in opposition until 1208)
- Sigfried III von Eppstein 1230–1249
- Christian II von Weisenau 1249–1251

=== Archbishops and Prince-Electors, 1251–1803 ===
- Gerhard I von Daun-Kirberg 1251–1259
- Werner II von Eppstein 1260–1284
- Heinrich II von Isny 1286–1288
- Gerhard II von Eppstein 1286–1305
- Peter of Aspelt 1306–1320
- Matthias von Bucheck 1321–1328
- Heinrich III von Virneberg 1328–1337
  - Baldwin of Luxembourg 1328–1336, administrator
- Gerlach von Nassau 1346–1371
- Johann I von Luxemburg-Ligny 1371–1373
- Louis of Meissen 1374–1379
- Adolf I von Nassau 1379–1390
- Konrad II von Weinsberg 1390–1396
- Joffrid von Leiningen 1396–1397
- Johann II von Nassau 1397–1419
- Conrad III of Dhaun, Wild- and Rhinegrave zum Stein 1419–1434
- Dietrich Schenk von Erbach 1434–1459
- Dieter von Isenburg 1459–1461
- Adolf II von Nassau (or Adolf III) 1461–1475
- Dieter von Isenburg (restored) 1476–1482
- Adalbert III of Saxony 1482–1484
- Bertold von Henneberg-Römhild 1484–1504
- Jakob von Liebenstein 1504-1508
- Uriel von Gemmingen 1508–1514
- Albert III of Brandenburg 1514–1545
- Sebastian von Heusenstamm 1545–1555
- Daniel Brendel von Homburg 1555–1582
- Wolfgang von Dalberg 1582–1601
- Johann Adam von Bicken 1601–1604
- Johann Schweikhard von Kronberg 1604–1626
- Georg Friedrich von Greiffenklau 1626–1629
- Anselm Casimir Wambold von Umstadt 1629–1647
- Johann Philipp von Schönborn 1647–1673
- Lothar Friedrich von Metternich-Burscheid 1673–1675
- Damian Hartard von der Leyen-Hohengeroldseck 1675–1678
- Karl Heinrich von Metternich-Winneburg 1679
- Anselm Franz von Ingelheim 1679–1695
- Lothar Franz von Schönborn 1695–1729
- Franz Ludwig von Pfalz-Neuburg 1729–1732
- Philipp Karl von Eltz-Kempenich 1732–1743
- Johann Friedrich Karl von Ostein 1743–1763
- Emmerich Joseph von Breidbach zu Bürresheim 1763–1774
- Friedrich Karl Joseph von Erthal 1774–1802
- Karl Theodor von Dalberg 1802–1803

=== Bishops, 1802–present ===
- Joseph Ludwig Colmar (1802–1818)
- Joseph Vitus Burg (1829–1833)
- Johann Jakob Humann (1833–1834)
- Petrus Leopold Kaiser (1834–1848)
- Wilhelm Emmanuel Freiherr von Ketteler (1850–1877)
- sede vacante (1877–1886)
- Paul Leopold Haffner (1886–1899)
- Heinrich Brück (1900–1903)
- Georg Heinrich Kirstein (1903–1921)
- Ludwig Maria Hugo (1921–1935)
- Albert Stohr (1935–1961)
- Hermann Cardinal Volk (1962–1982)
- Karl Cardinal Lehmann (1983–2016)
- Peter Kohlgraf (2017– ...)

== Auxiliary bishops ==
=== Before 1807 ===
- Hermann, O.F.M. (1405–1450)
- Hermann von Gehrden, O.P. (1432–1471)
- Sigfried Piscator, O.P. (1446–1455) and (1462–1473)
- Heinrich Hopfgarten, O.S.A. (1455–1460)
- Heinrich von Rübenach, O.P. (1457–1493)
- Johannes Schulte, O.S.A. (1466–1489)
- Berthold von Oberg, O.P. (1468–1489)
- Dionysius Part, O.P. (1474–1475)
- Matthias Emich, O. Carm. (1476–1480)
- Georg Fabri, O.P. (1490–1498)
- Erhard von Redwitz, O. Cist. (1494–1502)
- Johannes Bonemilch (1497–1508)
- Thomas Ruscher (1502–1510)
- Paul Huthen (1509–1532)
- Johannes Münster (1511–1537)
- Maternus Pistor (1534)
- Michael Helding (1538–1550)
- Georg Neumann (bishop) (1550–1551)
- Wolfgang Westermeyer (1551–1568)
- Balthasar Fannemann (Waneman) (1551–1561)
- Leonhard Zittardus, O.P. (1563–1569)
- Stephan Weber (1570–1622)
- Nikolaus Elgard (1577–1587)
- Valentin Mohr, O.S.B. (1606–1608)
- Cornelius Gobelius (1609–1611)
- Christoph Weber (1615–1633)
- Ambrosius Seibaeus (Seybeus) (1623–1644)
- Wolther Heinrich von Strevesdorff, O.E.S.A. (1634–1674)
- Berthold Nihus (1655–1657)
- Peter Walenburch (1658–1670)
- Johann Brassert (1674–1676)
- Adolph Gottfried Volusius (1676–1679)
- Johann Daniel von Gudenus (1680–1694)
- Matthias Starck (1681–1702)
- Johann Jakob Senfft (1695–1718)
- Johann Edmund Gedult von Jungenfeld (1703–1727)
- Johann Joachim Hahn (1718–1725)
- Christoph Ignaz von Gudenus (1726–1747)
- Caspar Adolph Schernauer (1728–Jun 1733)
- Christoph Nebel (1733–1769)
- Johann Friedrich von Lasser (1748–1769)
- Johann Georg Joseph von Eckart (1769–1792)
- Ludwig Philipp Behelm (1769–1777)
- August Franz von Strauß (Strauss) (1778–1782)
- Johann Valentin Heimes (1783–1806)
- Johann Maximilian von Haunold (1792–1807)

=== Since 1954 ===
- Joseph Maria Reuß (Reuss) (1954–1978)
- Wolfgang Rolly (1972–2003)
- Franziskus Eisenbach (1988–2002)
- Werner Guballa (2003–2012)
- Ulrich Neymeyr (2003–2014)
- Udo Markus Bentz (2015– 2024)
- Joshy George Pottackal OCarm (2026-)

== Electoral title ==
The Elector of Mainz was one of the seven Prince-electors of the Holy Roman Empire. As both the Archbishop of Mainz and the ruling prince of the Electorate of Mainz, the Elector of Mainz held a powerful position during the Middle Ages. The Archbishop-Elector was president of the electoral college, archchancellor of the empire, and the Primate of Germany as the papal legate north of the Alps, until the dissolution of the empire in 1806.

This archbishopric was a substantial ecclesiastical principality of the Holy Roman Empire. Its area reached 3200 sq. miles by the end of the Empire. The last elector was Karl Theodor von Dalberg, who lost his temporal power when the archbishopric was secularized in 1803. The ecclesiastical principality included lands near Mainz on both the left and right banks of the Rhine, as well as territory along the Main above Frankfurt (including the district of Aschaffenburg), the Eichsfeld region in Lower Saxony and Thuringia, and the territory around Erfurt in Thuringia. The archbishop was also, traditionally, one of the Imperial Prince-Electors, the Arch-chancellor of Germany, and presiding officer of the electoral college technically from 1251 and permanently from 1263 until 1803.

The see was established in ancient Roman times, in the city of Mainz, which had been a Roman provincial capital called Moguntiacum, but the office really came to prominence upon its elevation to an archdiocese in 780/82. The first bishops before the 4th century have legendary names, beginning with Crescens. The first verifiable Bishop of Mainz was Martinus in 343. The ecclesiastical and secular importance of Mainz dates from the accession of St. Boniface to the see in 747. Boniface was previously an archbishop, but the honor did not immediately devolve upon the see itself until his successor Lullus.

In 1802, Mainz lost its archiepiscopal character. In the secularizations that accompanied the Reichsdeputationshauptschluss ("German mediatization") of 1803, the seat of the elector, Karl Theodor von Dalberg, was moved to Regensburg, and the electorate lost its left bank territories to France, its right bank areas along the Main below Frankfurt to Hesse-Darmstadt and the Nassau princes, and Eichsfeld and Erfurt to Prussia. Dalberg retained the Aschaffenburg area however, and when the Holy Roman Empire finally came to an end in 1806, this became the core of Dalberg's new Grand Duchy of Frankfurt. Dalberg resigned in 1813 and in 1815 the Congress of Vienna divided his territories between the King of Bavaria, the Elector of Hesse, the Grand Duke of Hesse-Darmstadt and the Free City of Frankfurt.

The modern Diocese of Mainz was founded in 1802, within the territory of France and in 1814 its jurisdiction was extended over the territory of Hesse-Darmstadt. Since then it has had two cardinals and via various concordats was allowed to retain the mediæval tradition of the cathedral chapter electing a successor to the bishop.
