= Maximus of Mainz =

5th-century Roman bishop

Maximus (born in the late 4th century or early 5th century; died the 5th century) was an ancient Roman bishop, thought to have been the second bishop of Mogontiacum (Mainz, now in Germany) and possibly the last to hold that position under the Roman Empire.

== Historical evidence ==
According to the earliest surviving list of bishops of Mogontiacum (Mainz), Maximus was the second bishop of the city. That list derives from the 10th century Fuldaer Totenannalen, compiled between 919 and 923 under archbishop Heriger. It notes Maximus, as the successor to Aureus, probably martyred during the Hun campaign against the Burgundians in 436, which also affected Mogontiacum. On this hypothesis, Maximus could have acted as Aureus' successor as bishop from 436 onwards. Eugen Ewig argues that Maximus was also the last bishop of Mogontiacum during the Roman era, which ended with the Frankish takeover in 456. Maximus' time as bishop was possibly followed by a vacancy, then by Sidonius as the first bishop of the Frankish era.

Later versions of the list are composed of other bishops of Mainz (often historically unambiguous or only with vague dates assigned to them), and include Theonistus, after Aureus. In a translation by Sigehard, a monk of St. Alban's Abbey, Mainz of 1298 ("Passio, inventio et translatio sanctorum Aurei et Justinae").

== Feast day ==
In the calendar of the Roman Catholic Diocese of Mainz, he celebrates a joint feast day with bishops Crescens, Aureus and Theonistus.

== Bibliography (in German) ==
- Eugen Ewig: Die ältesten Mainzer Bischofsgräber, die Bischofsliste und die Theonestlegende. In: Eugen Ewig: Spätantikes und fränkisches Gallien. Gesammelte Schriften (1952–1973). Herausgegeben von Hartmut Atsma, Bd. 2, Artemis, Zürich, München 1979, ISBN 3-7608-4653-X, S. 171–181.
- Eugen Ewig: Die ältesten Mainzer Patrozinien und die Frühgeschichte des Bistums Mainz. In: Eugen Ewig: Spätantikes und fränkisches Gallien. Gesammelte Schriften (1952–1973). Herausgegeben von Hartmut Atsma, Bd. 2, Artemis, Zürich, München 1979, ISBN 3-7608-4653-X, S. 154–170.
- Friedhelm Jürgensmeier: Das Bistum Mainz. Von der Römerzeit bis zum II. Vatikanischen Konzil. 2. Auflage. Verlag Josef Knecht, Frankfurt am Main 1989, ISBN 3-7820-0570-8
- Hans Werner Nopper: Die vorbonifatianischen Mainzer Bischöfe. Eine kritische Untersuchung der Quellen zu den Anfängen des Bistums Mainz und zur Zuverlässigkeit der Bischofslisten. Selbstverlag, Mülheim an der Ruhr (Books on Demand, Norderstedt) 2002, ISBN 3-8311-2429-9.
