= Christian of Mainz =

Christian of Mainz may refer to:

- Christian I (archbishop of Mainz), r. 1165–1183
- Christian II (archbishop of Mainz), r. 1249–1251
