= St Michael's Church, Erfurt =

St Michael's Church
- German: Michaeliskirche
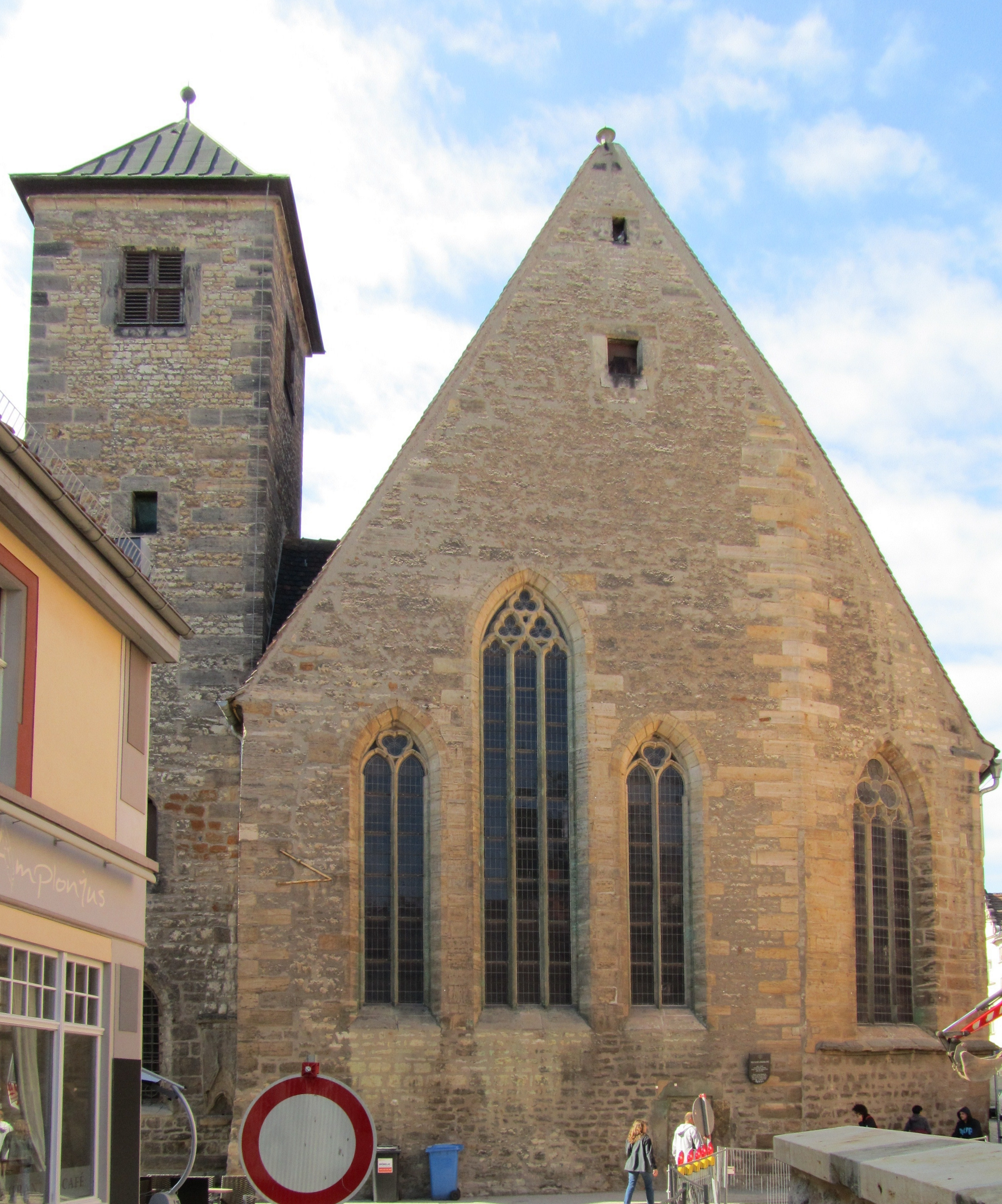
- View from east

- Location in Germany
- 50°58′46″N 11°01′42″E
- Location: Erfurt, Thuringia
- Country: Germany
- Language: German
- Denomination: Lutheran; Old Catholic
- Previous denomination: Catholic

History
- Status: Active
- Dedication: St Michael

Architecture
- Functional status: Simultaneum
- Heritage designation: Kulturdenkmal in Thuringia
- Style: Gothic, Neo-Gothic
- Years built: c. 1183, 1278–1290

St Michael's Church (Michaeliskirche) in the historical centre of the city of Erfurt, the capital of Thuringia, Germany, is a Gothic Protestant church building. It belongs to the Evangelische Stadtmission Erfurt and is the university church of the University of Erfurt.

== History ==
Around 1183, a church was built on the present site, donated by the patricians Walter Kerlinger and Dietrich Hotermann as well as Conrad Brun and Heinrich de Stalberg. At that time, the church was located on the Via Regia next to the Jewish quarter of Erfurt. The late-Romanesque lower storeys of the tower today are still from the first church. Then, between 1278 and 1290 – under the long-time pastor Heinrich Bauso – a choirless Gothic hall was built, the core of today's church.

Since 1392, St Michael's Church had been the university church of the then founded University of Erfurt. The university's teaching buildings were directly opposite it, including later the Collegium Maius. In 1451, a northern side nave and galleries were added. Around 1500, the Trinity Chapel was completed, donated by the pastor, theology professor, multiple dean and rector of the university, Auxiliary Bishop Johannes Bonemilch von Lasphe.

Martin Luther, who studied in Erfurt between 1501 and 1505, regularly attended masses in St Michael's Church. He preached here on 21 October 1522, after Erfurt's first Protestant sermon was preached in St Michael's Church in the previous year. Bonemilch had ordained Luther a priest in 1507 (probably on 3 April). Luther's friend Johannes Lang, the reformer of Erfurt, preached in St Michael's Church from 1530 and was buried here in 1548.

In 1681, the pointed barrel was renewed. Between 1742 and 1750, further overhaul work took place. With the closure of the university in 1816, St Michael's Church became a parish church. In 1819 and 1820, a remodelling in the Gothic Revival style was carried out.

A further extension was added to the west side in 1928. At the same time, the neo-Gothic interior decoration was removed and replaced by the New Objectivity style. On 9 February 1945, a US Air Force bombing raid on Erfurt's historical part caused severe damage to the roof and interior of the church, and the organ was badly damaged, too. The church was then secured to the extent that it did not become a ruin. A restoration in 1958–1960 then allowed the church to be used again. Since 1973, the church has been administered by the Evangelische Stadtmission (Protestant City Mission).

In 1987, during the GDR era, the church hosted a highly acclaimed exhibition entitled Stadtgerechter Verkehr, verkehrsgerechte Stadt ("City-just Traffic, Traffic-just City"), which was particularly directed against the planned extension of the city ring road through the old part of the city. This was followed by exhibitions from 1987 to 1989 entitled "Creation Element Water" and "Creation Element Air", which dealt with the corresponding environmental problems in the GDR.

From 1989 to 1995, the exterior and interior of the church were renovated again. Since Pentecost 2007, it has also served as a place of worship for the "Old Catholic Community of West Thuringia / Erfurt", which holds services there on every second and fourth Sunday of the month. In 2002, the Michaeliskirche was re-designated as a university church, and in 2007 the first university service was held after the re-designation.

The church tower contains Erfurt's oldest bell – named "Katharina", dating from 1380.

St Michael's churchyard is "one of the most beautiful witnesses of late Gothic architecture". In addition to 24 erected grave monuments from the 17th to 19th centuries that originate from the floor of the church, it also has two historical gravestones from the 15th and 16th centuries.

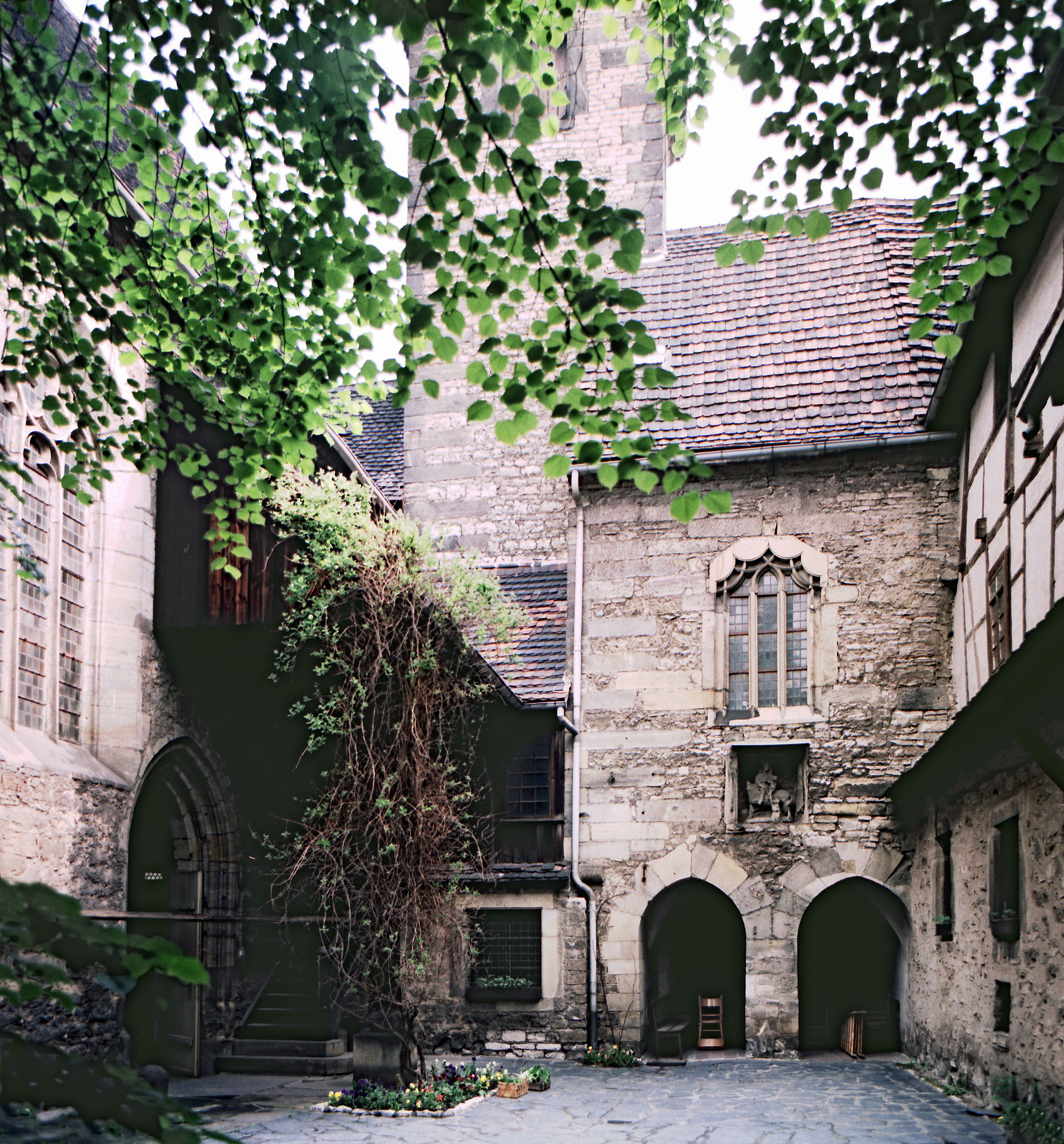
The churchyard

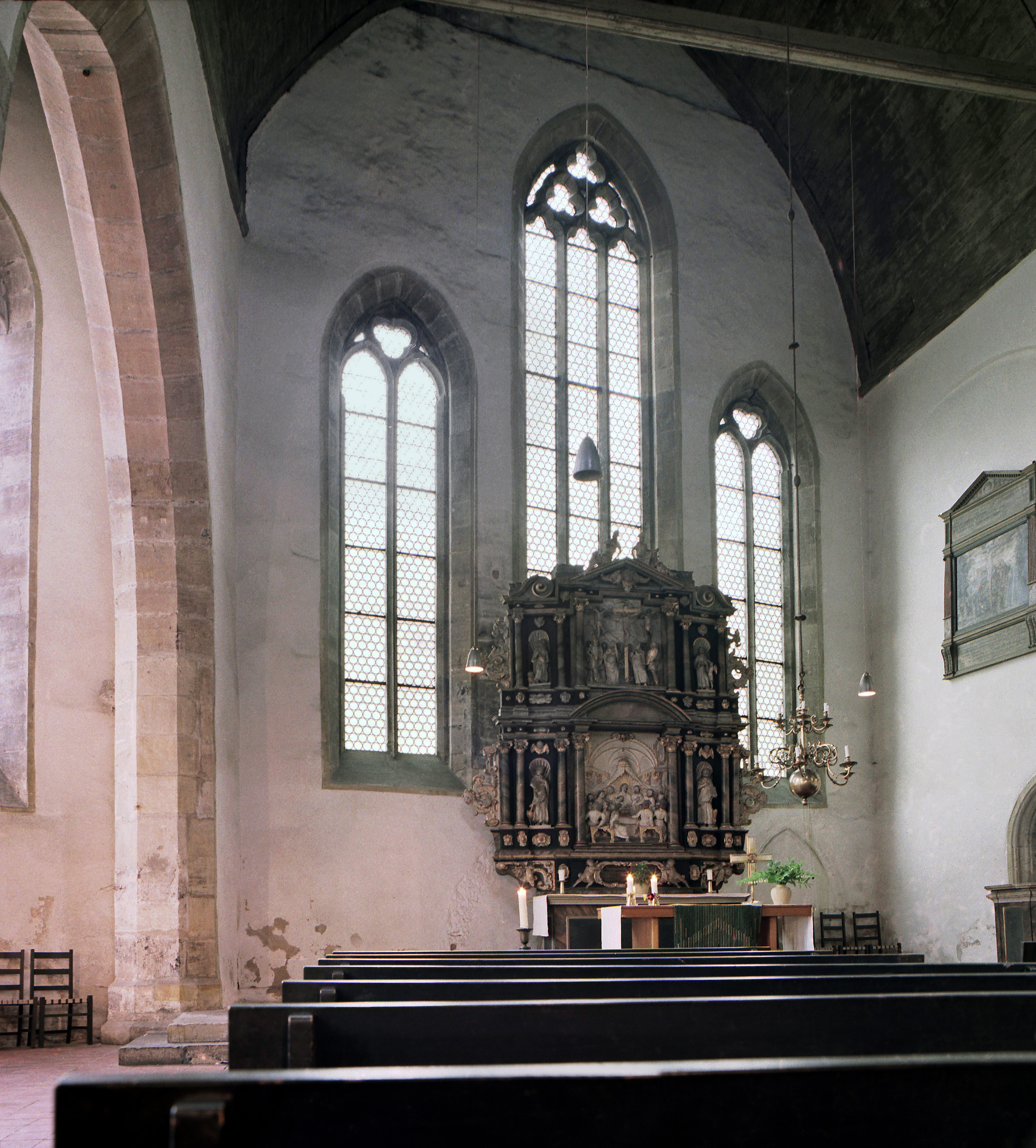
Interior view

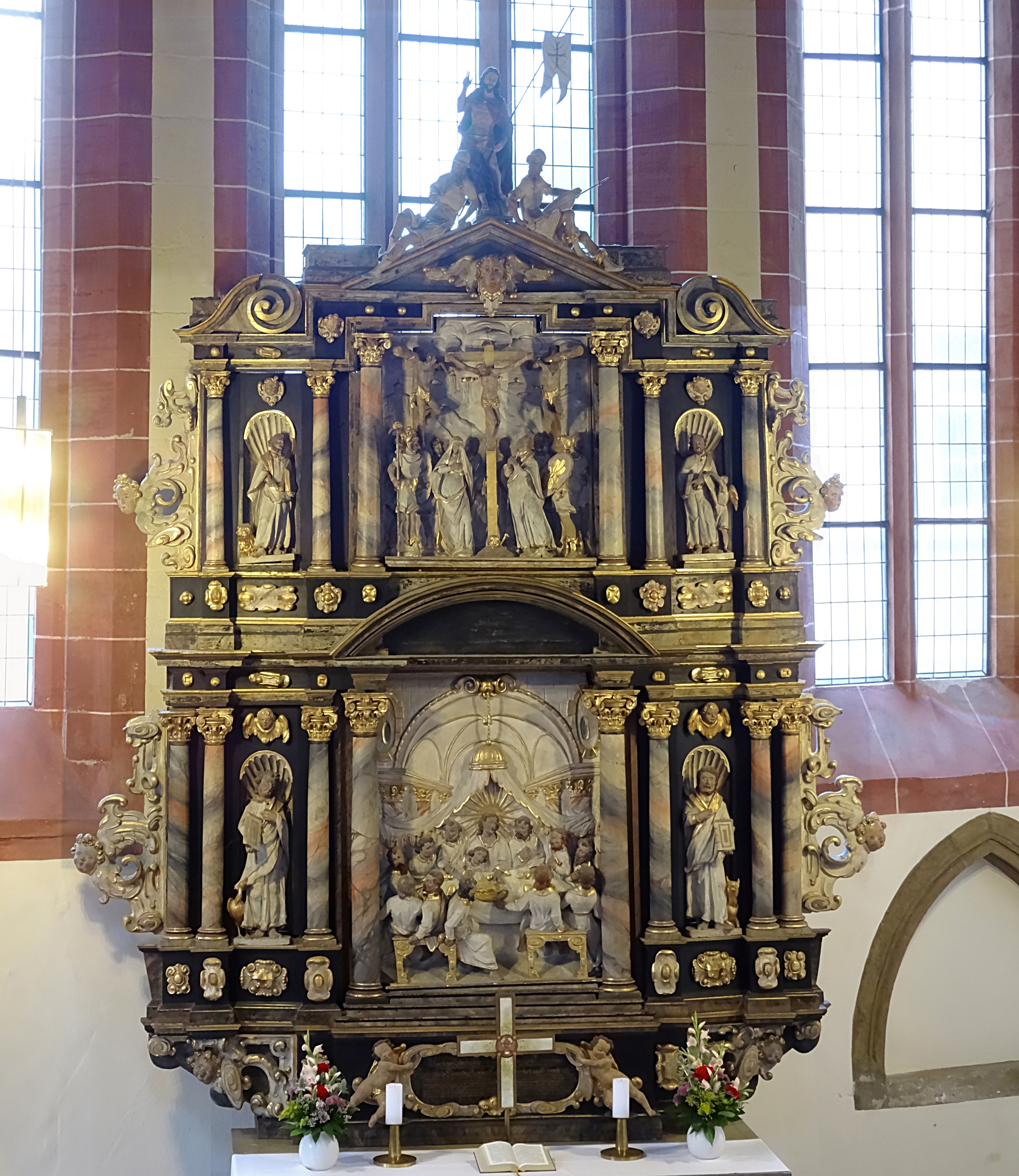
The altar

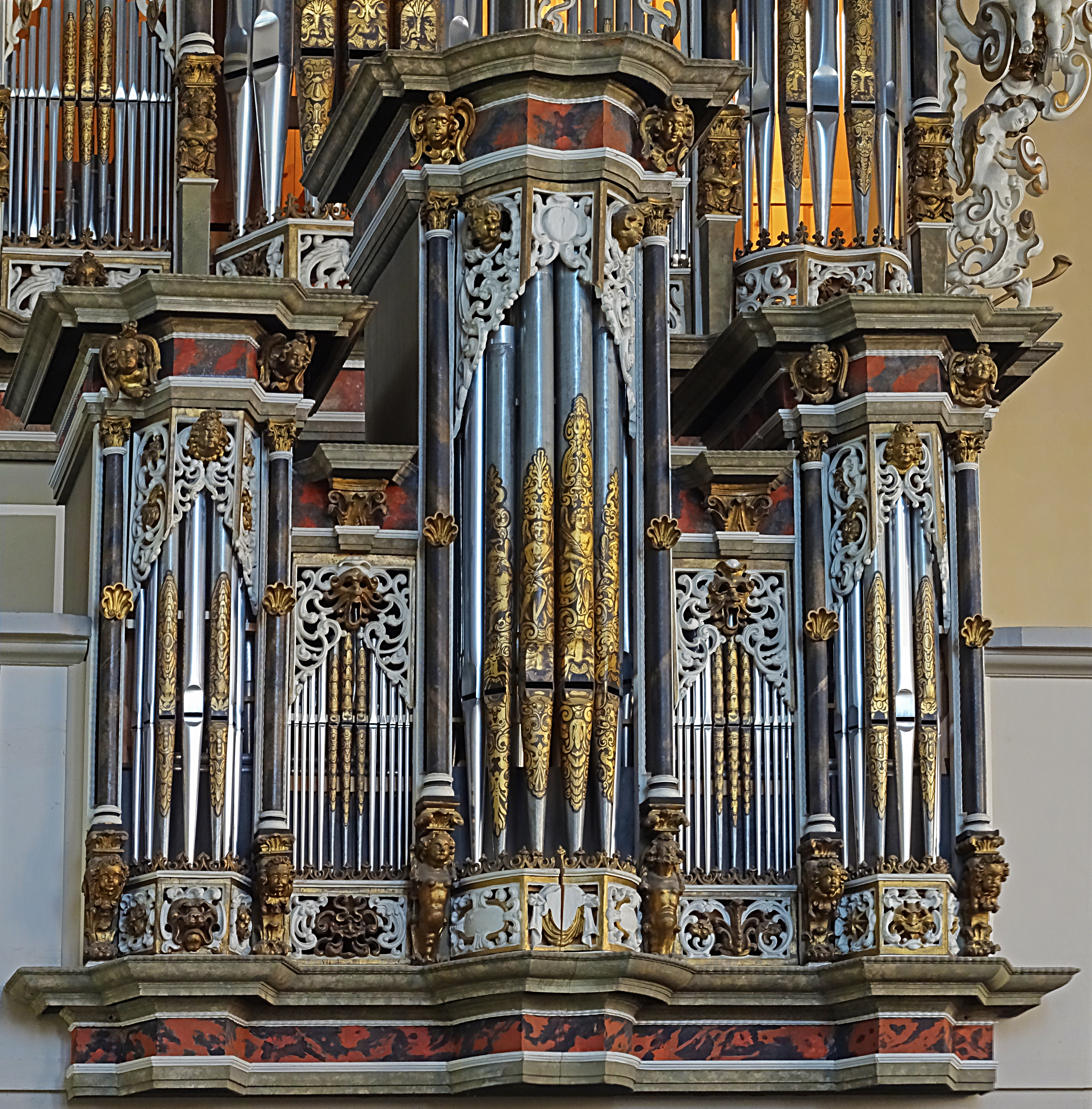
The organ

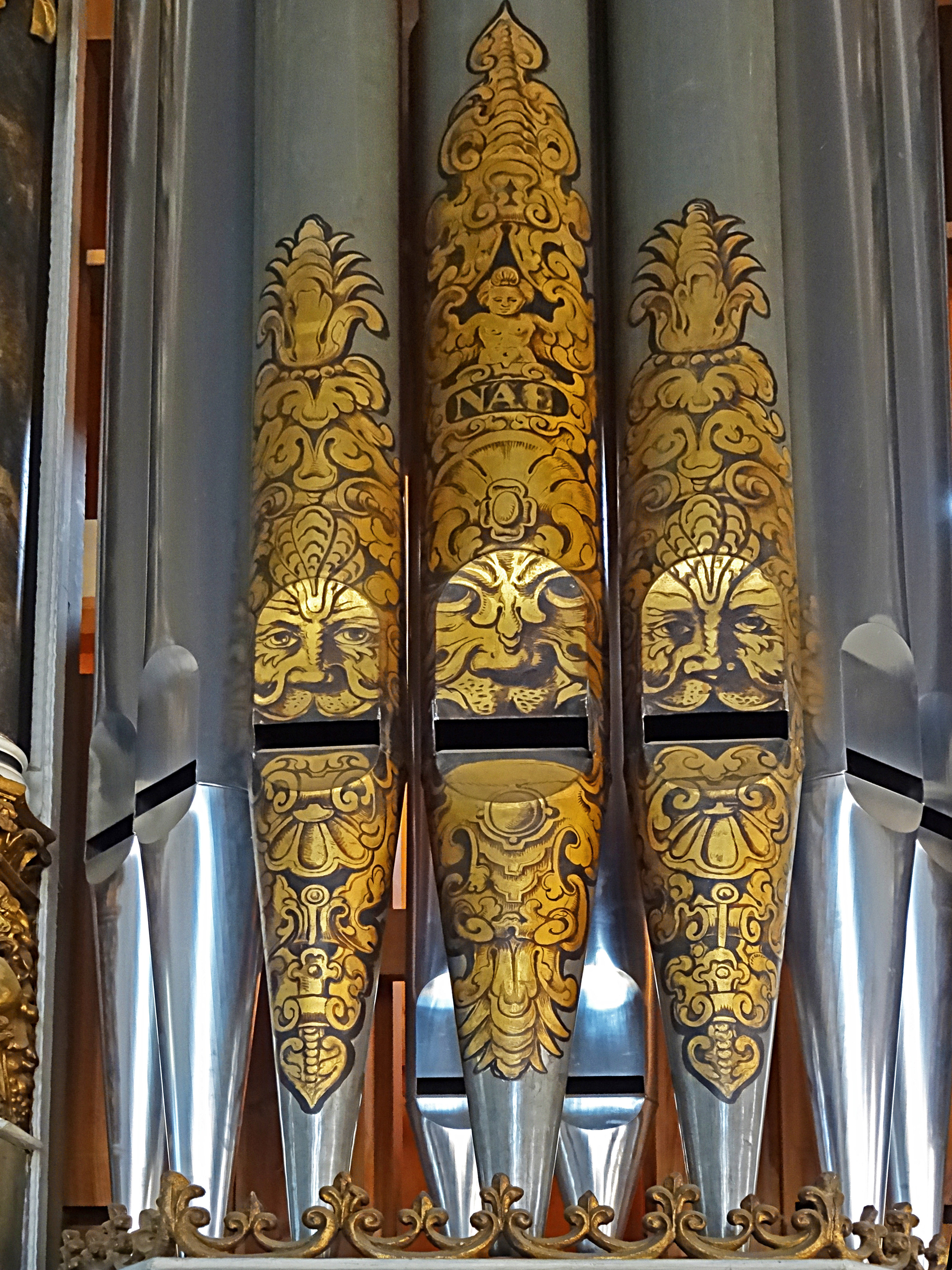
Painted façade pipes

== Organ ==
After the organist and organ builder Balthasar Kühn suffered a fatal accident in 1648 while repairing the organ, its condition became worse and worse. Finally, it was decided to have Ludwig Compenius build a new instrument from the material of the old organ and that of the demolished St George's Church. It was completed in 1652. After that, St Michael's Church became an important musical centre.

In 1753, the Wagner brothers renewed and enlarged the organ. In 1896, the Wilhelm Rühlmann company from Merseburg built a new pneumatic instrument for which only parts of the old organ were reused. In 1928, the organ was moved to the present gallery and rebuilt once more.

The Compenius organ did not escape the bomb damage in 1945. From 1999 to 2000, it was reconstructed by the organ-building workshop Rühle from Moritzburg. Large parts of Compenius' case and the 27 painted façade pipes have been preserved. The instrument is meantone tempered on the chorus tone.

== Bibliography ==
- Mai, Otto-Arend (1989). Die evangelischen Kirchen in Erfurt (in German) (2nd ed.). Berlin: Evangelische Verlagsanstalt. pp. 106–113. ISBN 3-374-00936-0.
- Garbe, Christian (2001). Michaeliskirche Erfurt. Kleine Kunstführer (in German). Regensburg: Schnell und Steiner. ISBN 3-7954-6235-5.
