= Siegfried III (archbishop of Mainz) =

German archbishop

- Archbishop of Mainz
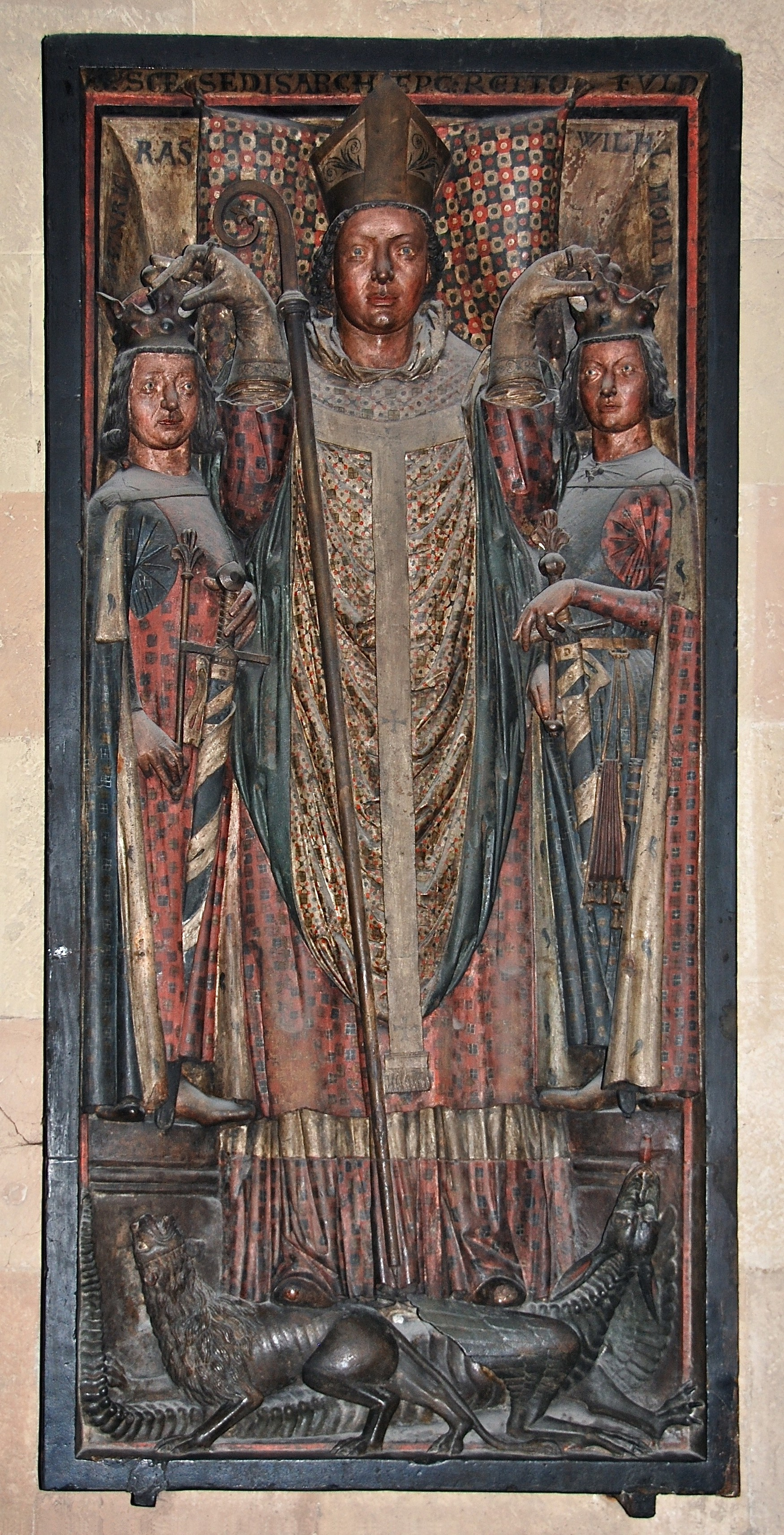
- Archbishop Siegfried III of Mainz, shown crowning Henry Raspe and William II of Holland. The oldest memorial in Mainz Cathedral.
- Church: Catholic Church
- Diocese: Electorate of Mainz
- In office: 1230–1249

Personal details
- Died: 9 March 1249

Siegfried III von Eppstein (died 9 March 1249) house of Eppstein was Archbishop of Mainz from 1230 to 1249. He in 1244 granted freedom to the citizens of Mainz, who subsequently could run their affairs more independently though their own council; in law it remained an episcopal city.

He acted as regent for Conrad IV of Germany, while Emperor Frederick II was campaigning in Italy, 1237 to 1242. He was, though, a supporter of Pope Innocent IV.

He held a major synod in 1239.

He added Lorsch Abbey to the archbishopric.

== Notes ==
Preceded by Siegfried II	Archbishop of Mainz; 1230–1249	Succeeded by Christian II
