= Aureus of Mainz =

Saint Aureus of Mainz
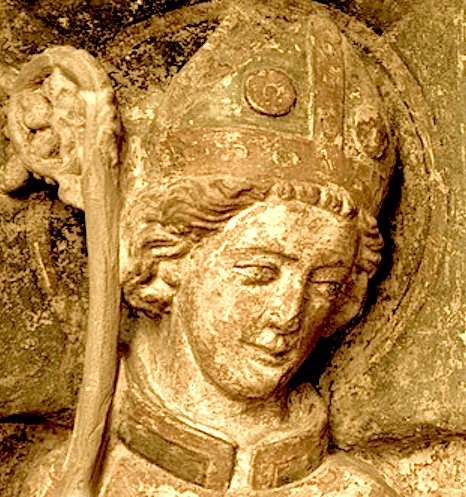
- Aureus on a 1320 tombstone in the choir of the Aegidienkirche in Heilbad Heiligenstadt.

Bishop of Mainz Hieromartyr
- Born: Unknown; Rhone-Loire region
- Residence: Mainz or Eichsfeld
- Died: 16 June 436 or 451; Mainz
- Venerated in: Roman Catholic Church; Eastern Orthodox Church
- Major shrine: Mainz, Heilbad Heiligenstadt, Oberursel-Bommersheim
- Feast: June 16
- Patronage: Mainz, Heilbad Heiligenstadt

Aureus of Mainz (born at an unknown date in the Rhone-Loire region; died c. 436 or 451, Mainz or Eichsfeld) is a Roman Catholic saint and the first named bishop of Mainz. His feast is on 16 June.

== Life ==
His is the first name on the earliest surviving list of bishops of Mainz, which dates to the 10th century. The only sources for his life are church sources and legends of his life. The earliest one derives from a work written by Rabanus Maurus, the first Archbishop of Mainz after it was promoted to an archdiocese in the early 780s - this was written on Rabanus' consecration of Fulda Abbey, in whose south aisle there was later an altar dedicated to Aureus. In 843 Rabanus also wrote a martyrology testifying to the murder of Aureus and his sister St Justina on 16 June in a church during a Hun raid. Later sources fix the raid in 454, but this is unlikely and may be an error for one of the datable raids in 451. If the raid occurred in the migratory period, the raids in 451, 436, 406-407 or even 368 is possible - Alban of Mainz is said to have been beheaded for preaching against Arianism during a raid in 406-407 for example. Diesel's tradition speaks of bishop Aureus as being expelled before the time of Alban.

This would mean Aureus was bishop of Mainz before 406. Tradition holds that the people of Mainz expelled him for opposing Arianism and that Theonistus and Alban carried on his work in his absence. Aureus then returned to the now-destroyed city after 406 and resumed his work as bishop. However, if his martyrdom is dated to 451, this would mean he was in office for fifty years and complicates the dating of the next bishop, Maximus. Aureus and his sister Justina were thus probably martyred in 436. His remains were either buried in the city's Basilica of St Alban immediately after his death or transferred there in 805.

== Cult ==
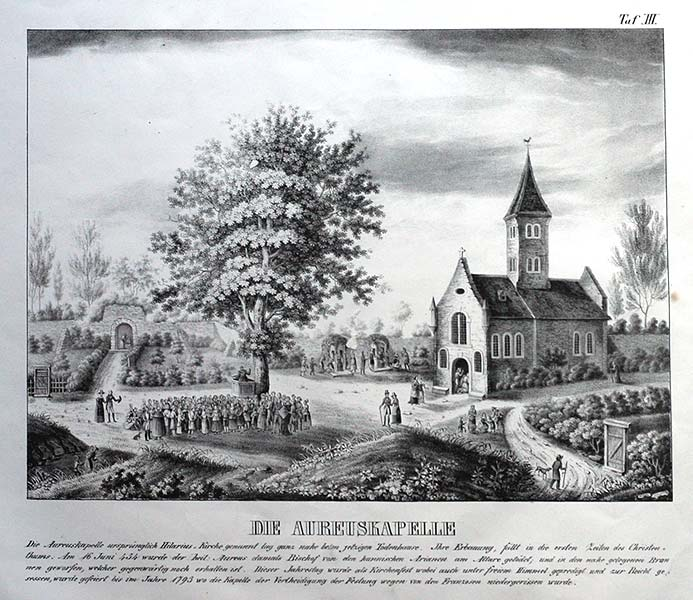
Lithograph of the ruins of the Aureuskapelle by Jean Dionis Bernard Wasserburg (1813–1885), brother of Philipp Wasserburg

He is traditionally venerated as a saint in the Diocese of Mainz. The Aureuskapelle chapel was built in the Zahlbach district of the city on the traditional site of his martyrdom and his initial burial - it is probably the earliest site of Christian worship in Mainz. Its predecessor was the St. Hilariuskirche, often the burial place for early bishops of the city. It was completely destroyed in the Siege of Mainz in 1793 and replaced by a new building to designs by Vincenz Statz, which was itself destroyed in an air-raid in 1944.

In 1022, relics of Aureus was transferred to Heilbad Heiligenstadt, where from the late Middle Ages he and the deacon Justinus were revered as patron saints of the town. This was based on a different version of his legend, in which he and his deacon Justinus were fleeing Atilla the Hun, who caught up with them at Eichsfeld, where he tortured and beheaded them. They were then buried there and miracles began occurring on the spot. He is also venerated in Oberursel-Bommersheim and has a festival in the diocesan calendar of Mainz on 16 June.

== Churches dedicated to him ==
- St. Aureus und Justina (Bommersheim)
- St. Aureus und Justina (Büdesheim)

== Bibliography ==
- (in German) Hans Werner Nopper: Die vorbonifatianischen Mainzer Bischöfe, Books on Demand, Norderstedt 2001, ISBN 3-8311-2429-9
