= Sigfried =

Sigfried is a male given name, and may refer to:

- Sigfried Asche (1906–1985), German art historian
- Sigfried Bethke (born 1954), German physicist
- Sigfried, Count of the Ardennes (922–998), first ruler of Luxembourg
- Sigfried Giedion (1888–1968), Bohemia-born Swiss historian
- Sigfried Held (born 1942), former German football player
- Sigfried Piscator (1411–1473), German Roman Catholic bishop

== See also ==
- Siegfried
