= Johannes Schleeter =

Roman Catholic prelate (1434–1457)

Most Reverend Johannes Schleeter
- Titular Bishop of Venecompensis; Auxiliary Bishop of Cologne
- Church: Catholic Church
- Archdiocese: Archdiocese of Cologne
- In office: 1434–1457

Personal details
- Born: Dortmund, Germany
- Died: 29 May 1457 Cologne, Germany

Johannes Schleeter, O.F.M. (died 29 May 1457) was a Roman Catholic prelate who served as the Auxiliary Bishop of Cologne (1434–1457).

== Biography ==
Johannes Schleeter was born in Dortmund, Germany and was ordained a priest in the Order of Friars Minor. On 24 October 1434, he was appointed during the papacy of Pope Eugene IV as Titular Bishop of Venecompensis and Auxiliary Bishop of Cologne. He served as Auxiliary Bishop of Cologne until his death on 29 May 1457.

== External links and additional sources ==
- Cheney, David M. "Venecompensis (Titular See)". Catholic-Hierarchy.org. (for Chronology of Bishops) ^{[self-published]}
- Cheney, David M. "Archdiocese of Köln {Cologne}". Catholic-Hierarchy.org. (for Chronology of Bishops) ^{[self-published]}
- Chow, Gabriel. "Metropolitan Archdiocese of Köln (Germany)". GCatholic.org. (for Chronology of Bishops) ^{[self-published]}

Catholic Church titles
| Preceded by | Titular Bishop of Venecompensis; 1434–1457 | Succeeded by Heinrich von Rübenach |
| Preceded by | Auxiliary Bishop of Cologne; 1434–1457 | Succeeded by |
