= Christian II (archbishop of Mainz) =

- Archbishop of Mainz
- Church: Catholic Church
- Diocese: Archdiocese of Mainz
- In office: 1249–1251

Personal details
- Born: c. 1185
- Died: 21 November 1253

Christian II (c. 1185 – 21 November 1253), also called Christian von Weisenau and Christian von Bolanden, was the archbishop of Mainz from 1249 to 1251. He belonged a respected local family of Weißenau, descended from the ministeriales of Bolanden and related to the lords of Eppstein. His parents' names are unknown, but his grandparents were Dudo and Gisela and his brothers were Dudo and Embricho.

Christian first emerges as the provost of the collegiate church of Saint Victor in Mainz, and then progressively as cantor, dean and provost of the cathedral chapter of Mainz. After the death of Archbishop Siegfried III (9 March 1249), the chapter elected Konrad von Hochstaden, already archbishop of Cologne, to be their archbishop. Pope Innocent IV and King William, however, refused to permit him to hold the two most powerful bishoprics in Germany simultaneously. Innocent suggested the chapter chose Heinrich von Leiningen, the bishop of Speyer, but he was refused. In June 1249, Christian, already advanced in age, was elected by the chapter as their second choice and was confirmed by the pope on 29 June. He was consecrated archbishop by Konrad von Hochstaden, acting as papal legate, in July or August.

Christian was unenthusiastic about prosecuting the war against the Hohenstaufen, whom the pope had declared deposed in Germany in favour of William. At a conference during Easter 1251, Pope Innocent, Heinrich von Leiningen and Arnold von Isenburg, the archbishop of Trier, agreed to seek the removal of Christian on account of his hesitancy. Innocent dispatched Cardinal Hugh of Saint-Cher to Mainz to convince the archbishop to resign. Having received assurances of compensation, Christian resigned in June 1251. His downfall might have owed much to the machinations of his successor, Gerhard von Dhaun. Afterwards, he joined the Knights of Saint John and moved to Paris, where he died. He authored a short chronicle.
