= Thomas Ruscher =

German catholic church figure

Most Reverend Thomas Ruscher
- Auxiliary Bishop of Mainz; Titular Bishop of Venecompensis
- Church: Catholic Church
- Diocese: Diocese of Mainz
- In office: 1502–1510

Orders
- Consecration: 19 Mar 1503 by Berthold von Henneberg

Personal details
- Born: 1449 Schwäbisch Gmünd, Germany
- Died: 8 Aug 1510 (age 61) Mainz, Germany

Thomas Ruscher (1449–1510) was a Roman Catholic prelate who served as Auxiliary Bishop of Mainz (1502–1510).

== Biography ==
Ruscher was born in 1449 in Schwäbisch Gmünd, Germany. On 19 Dec 1502, he was appointed during the papacy of Pope Alexander VI as Auxiliary Bishop of Mainz and Titular Bishop of Venecompensis. On 19 Mar 1503, he was consecrated bishop by Berthold von Henneberg, Archbishop of Mainz. He served as Auxiliary Bishop of Mainz until his death on 8 Aug 1510. While bishop, he was the principal consecrator of Jakob von Liebenstein, Archbishop of Mainz (1505).

== External links and additional sources ==
- Cheney, David M. "Venecompensis (Titular See)". Catholic-Hierarchy.org. (for Chronology of Bishops) ^{[self-published]}
- Cheney, David M. "Diocese of Mainz". Catholic-Hierarchy.org. (for Chronology of Bishops) ^{[self-published]}
- Chow, Gabriel. "Diocese of Mainz (Germany)". GCatholic.org. (for Chronology of Bishops) ^{[self-published]}

Catholic Church titles
Preceded by Erhard von Redwitz	Titular Bishop of Venecompensis; 1502–1510	Succeeded by Johannes Münster
Preceded by	Auxiliary Bishop of Mainz; 1502–1510	Succeeded by
