= Heinrich von Rübenach =

German Roman Catholic prelate

Most Reverend Heinrich von Rübenach
- Auxiliary Bishop of Mainz; Titular Bishop of Venecompensus
- Church: Catholic Church
- Diocese: Diocese of Mainz
- In office: 1457–1493

Personal details
- Died: 13 October 1493 Mainz, Germany

Heinrich von Rübenach, O.P. (died 1493) was a Roman Catholic prelate who served as Auxiliary Bishop of Mainz (1457–1493).

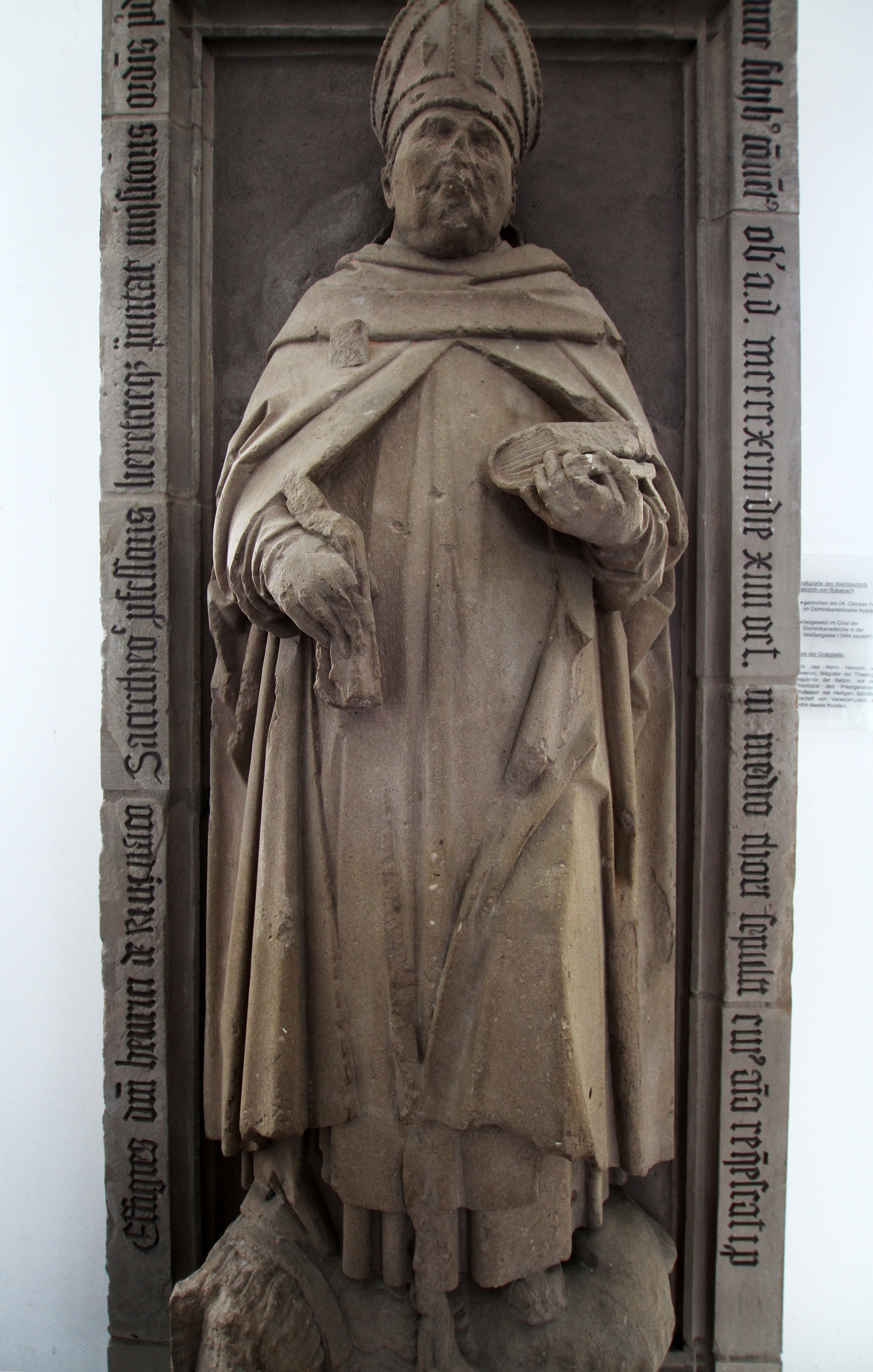

== Biography ==
Heinrich von Rübenach was ordained a priest in the Order of Preachers. On 9 Jul 1457, he was appointed during the papacy of Pope Callixtus III as Auxiliary Bishop of Mainz and Titular Bishop of Venecompensus. He served as Auxiliary Bishop of Mainz until his death on 13 Oct 1493.

== External links and additional sources ==
- Cheney, David M. "Venecompensis (Titular See)". Catholic-Hierarchy.org. (for Chronology of Bishops) ^{[self-published]}
- Cheney, David M. "Diocese of Mainz". Catholic-Hierarchy.org. (for Chronology of Bishops) ^{[self-published]}
- Chow, Gabriel. "Diocese of Mainz (Germany)". GCatholic.org. (for Chronology of Bishops) ^{[self-published]}

Catholic Church titles
Preceded by Johannes Schleeter	Titular Bishop of Venecompensis; 1457–1493	Succeeded by Erhard von Redwitz
Preceded by	Auxiliary Bishop of Mainz; 1457–1493	Succeeded by
