= Paul Huthen =

Roman Catholic prelate that served in the Auxiliary Bishop of Mainz

Most Reverend Paul Huthen
- Auxiliary Bishop of Mainz; Titular Bishop of Ascalon
- Church: Catholic Church
- Diocese: Diocese of Mainz
- In office: 1509–1532

Orders
- Consecration: 28 Feb 1509

Personal details
- Died: 28 April 1532 Mainz, Germany

Paul Huthen (died 1532) was a Roman Catholic prelate who served as Auxiliary Bishop of Mainz (1509–1532).

== Biography ==
On 9 Jan 1509, Paul Huthen was appointed during the papacy of Pope Julius II as Auxiliary Bishop of Mainz and on 19 Jan 1509, he was appointed Titular Bishop of Ascalon. On 28 Feb 1509, he was consecrated bishop. He served as Auxiliary Bishop of Mainz until his death on 28 Apr 1532.

== External links and additional sources ==
- Cheney, David M. "Diocese of Mainz". Catholic-Hierarchy.org. (for Chronology of Bishops) ^{[self-published]}
- Chow, Gabriel. "Diocese of Mainz (Germany)". GCatholic.org. (for Chronology of Bishops) ^{[self-published]}
