= Johannes Münster =

German Roman Catholic prelate

Most Reverend Johannes Münster
- Auxiliary Bishop of Mainz; Titular Bishop of Venecompensis
- Church: Catholic Church
- Diocese: Diocese of Mainz
- In office: 1511–1537

Personal details
- Died: 25 June 1544 Mainz, Germany

Johannes Münster (died 1544) was a Roman Catholic prelate who served as Auxiliary Bishop of Mainz (1511–1537).

== Biography ==
On 9 July 1511, Johannes Münster was appointed during the papacy of Pope Julius II as Auxiliary Bishop of Mainz and Titular Bishop of Venecompensis. He served as Auxiliary Bishop of Mainz until his resignation on 3 November 1537, and he died on 25 June 1544. While bishop, he was the principal co-consecrator of Nikolaus Schigmers, Titular Bishop of Daulia and Auxiliary Bishop of Speyer (1529), and of Philipp von Flersheim, Bishop of Speyer (1530).

== External links and additional sources ==
- Cheney, David M. "Venecompensis (Titular See)". Catholic-Hierarchy.org. (for Chronology of Bishops) ^{[self-published]}
- Cheney, David M. "Diocese of Mainz". Catholic-Hierarchy.org. (for Chronology of Bishops) ^{[self-published]}
- Chow, Gabriel. "Diocese of Mainz (Germany)". GCatholic.org. (for Chronology of Bishops) ^{[self-published]}

Catholic Church titles
Preceded by Thomas Ruscher	Titular Bishop of Venecompensis; 1511–1537	Succeeded by
Preceded by	Auxiliary Bishop of Mainz; 1511–1537	Succeeded by
