= Erhard von Redwitz =

German Roman Catholic prelate

Most Reverend Erhard von Redwitz
- Auxiliary Bishop of Mainz; Titular Bishop of Venecompensus
- Church: Catholic Church
- Diocese: Diocese of Mainz
- In office: 1494–1502

Orders
- Consecration: 16 Jun 1495

Personal details
- Died: 30 September 1502 Mainz, Germany

Erhard von Redwitz, O. Cist. (died 1502) was a Roman Catholic prelate who served as Auxiliary Bishop of Mainz (1494–1502).

== Biography ==
Erhard von Redwitz was ordained a priest in the Cistercian Order. On 14 Feb 1494, he was appointed during the papacy of Pope Alexander VI as Auxiliary Bishop of Mainz and Titular Bishop of Venecompensus. On 16 Jun 1495, he was consecrated bishop. He served as Auxiliary Bishop of Mainz until his death on 30 Sep 1502.

== See also ==
- Catholic Church in Germany

== External links and additional sources ==
- Cheney, David M. "Venecompensis (Titular See)". Catholic-Hierarchy.org. (for Chronology of Bishops) ^{[self-published]}
- Cheney, David M. "Diocese of Mainz". Catholic-Hierarchy.org. (for Chronology of Bishops) ^{[self-published]}
- Chow, Gabriel. "Diocese of Mainz (Germany)". GCatholic.org. (for Chronology of Bishops) ^{[self-published]}

Catholic Church titles
Preceded by Heinrich von Rübenach	Titular Bishop of Venecompensis; 1494–1502	Succeeded by Thomas Ruscher
Preceded by	Auxiliary Bishop of Mainz; 1494–1502	Succeeded by
