= Electorate of Mainz =

State of the Holy Roman Empire (780–1803)

Coordinates: 50°0′N 8°16′E

Prince-Archbishopric of Mainz Kurfürstentum Mainz (German) Electoratus Moguntinus (Latin)
- 780–1803
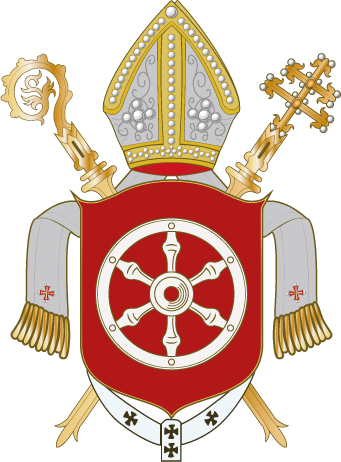
- Flag Coat of arms

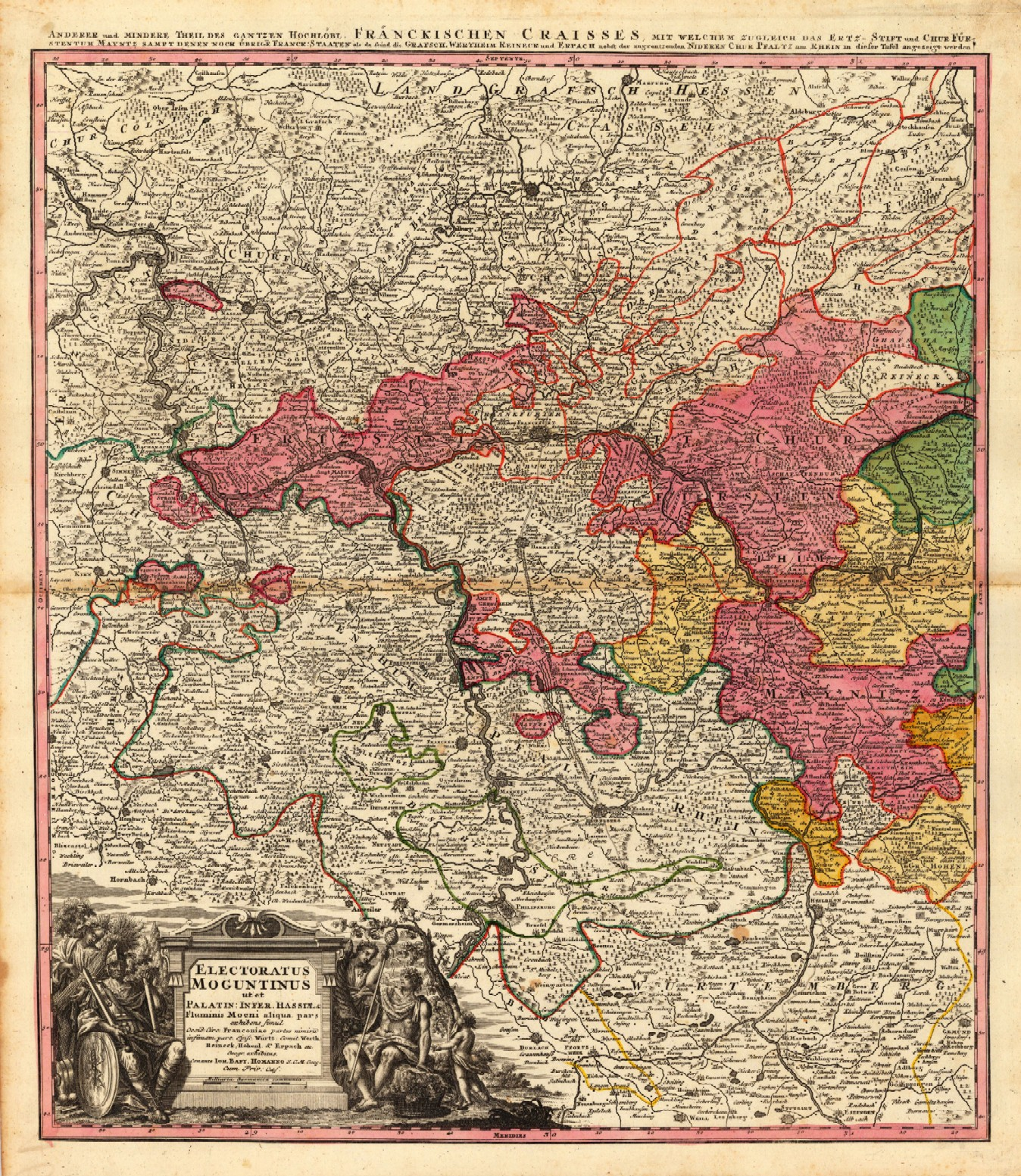
- Location of the Archbishopric of Mainz, 1729
- Status: State of the Holy Roman Empire
- Capital: Mainz
- Common languages: German
- Religion: Catholic Church
- Government: Ecclesiastical principality
- Prince-elector and Archbishop
  - 754–786: Lullus (first)
  - 1802–1803: Karl Theodor von Dalberg (last)
- Historical era: Middle Ages; Early Modern
  - Gained territory, elevated to archbishopric: 780
  - Gained territory: 983
  - Arch-chancellor: 1251
  - Mainz made Free City: 1242–1462
  - Republic of Mainz: 18 March – 23 July 1793
  - Treaty of Campo Formio: 17 October 1797
  - German Mediatisation: 1803

Population
  - 1760: 336,000
Preceded by
Duchy of Franconia
Succeeded by
Mont-Tonnerre
Principality of Aschaffenburg
Grand Duchy of Hesse
Duchy of Nassau
Kingdom of Prussia
- Today part of: Germany

The Electorate of Mainz (German: Kurfürstentum Mainz [ˈkuːɐ̯ˌfʏʁstn̩tuːm ˈmaɪnts] or Kurmainz [kuːɐ̯ˈmaɪnts]; Latin: Electoratus Moguntinus), previously known in English as Mentz and by its French name Mayence, was one of the most prestigious and influential states of the Holy Roman Empire. In the hierarchy of the Catholic Church, the Archbishop-Elector of Mainz was also the Primate of Germany (primas Germaniae), a purely honorary dignity that was unsuccessfully claimed from time to time by other archbishops. There were only two other ecclesiastical Prince-electors in the Empire: the Electorate of Cologne and the Electorate of Trier.

The Archbishop-Elector of Mainz was also archchancellor of Germany (one of the three component titular kingdoms of the Holy Roman Empire, the other two being Italy and Burgundy) and, as such, ranked first among all ecclesiastical and secular princes of the Empire, and was second only to the Emperor. His political role, particularly as an intermediary between the Estates of the Empire and the Emperor, was considerable.

== History ==
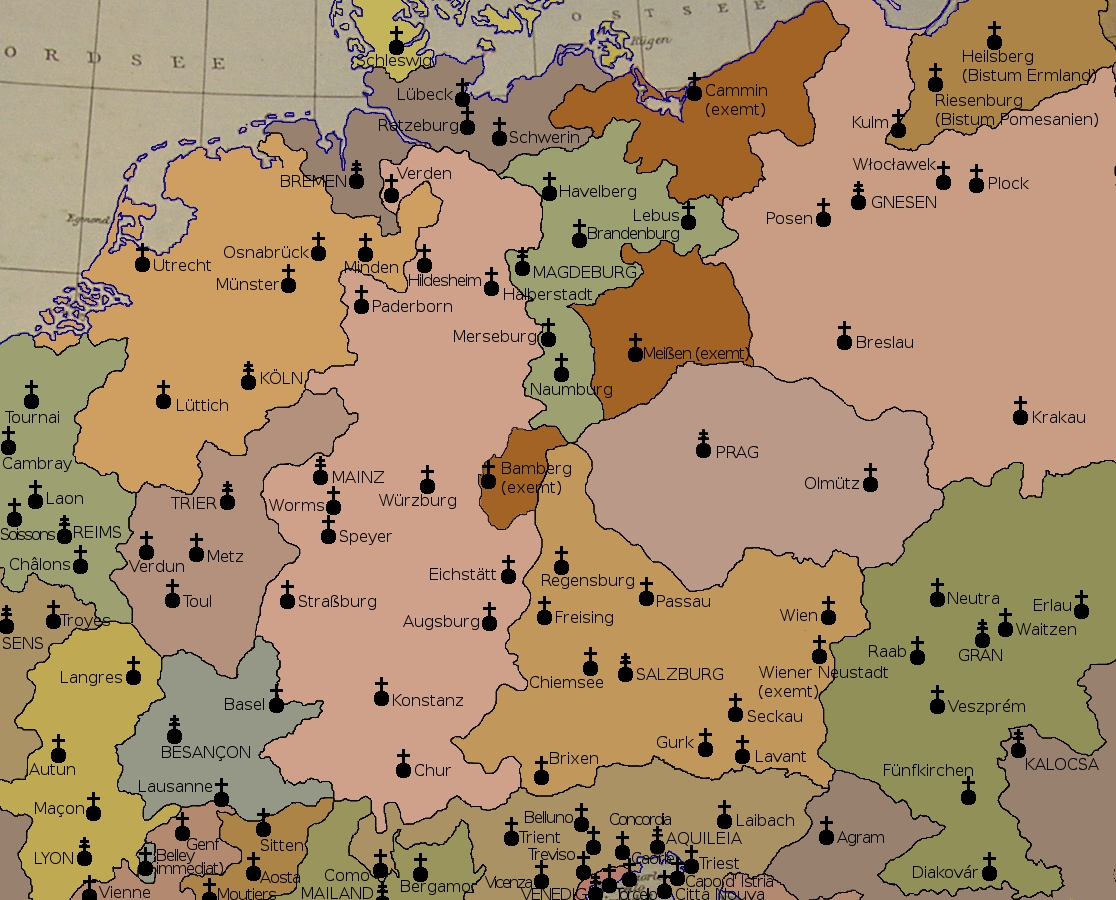
The archdioceses of Central Europe, 1500. After the Peace of Westphalia, the archdiocese of Mainz still remained the largest of Germany, covering 10 suffragant dioceses. The territory of dioceses and archdioceses (spiritual) was usually much larger than the prince-bishoprics and archbishoprics/electorates (temporal), ruled by the same individual.

The episcopal see was established in ancient Roman times in the city of Mainz, which had been a Roman provincial capital, Moguntiacum. The first bishops before the 4th century have legendary names, beginning with Crescens. The first verifiable Bishop of Mainz was Martinus in 343. The ecclesiastical and secular importance of Mainz dates from the accession of St. Boniface to the see in 747. Boniface was previously an archbishop though without an assigned see, but that ecclesiastical status did not immediately devolve upon the see itself until his successor Lullus; during his reign Mainz became an archdiocese, in 781. Another early bishop of Mainz was Aureus of Mainz.

The territory of the Electorate included several non-contiguous blocks of territory: lands near Mainz on both the left and right banks of the Rhine; territory along the Main River above Frankfurt (including the district of Aschaffenburg); the Eichsfeld region in Lower Saxony and Thuringia; and the territory around Erfurt in Thuringia.

As was generally the case in the Holy Roman Empire, the territory of a prince-bishopric or archbishopric differed from that of the corresponding diocese or archdiocese, which was the purely spiritual jurisdiction of the prince-bishop or archbishop. During the early modern age, the archdiocese of Mainz (see map below) was the largest ecclesiastical province of Germany, covering Mainz and 10 suffragant dioceses.

During the early modern period the cathedral chapter of Mainz controlled the election of the archbishop and used its power to ensure only its members were elevated. By this time membership in the chapter had been monopolized by a few families of Imperial Knights, securing their power within the Electorate.

In 1802, Mainz lost its archiepiscopal character. In the secularizations that accompanied the Reichsdeputationshauptschluss (German mediatization) of 1803, the seat of the elector, Karl Theodor von Dalberg, was moved to Regensburg, and the electorate lost its left bank territories to France, its right bank areas along the Main below Frankfurt to Hesse-Darmstadt and the Nassau princes, and Eichsfeld and Erfurt to the Kingdom of Prussia. Dalberg retained the Aschaffenburg area as the Principality of Aschaffenburg. In 1810 Dalberg merged Aschaffenburg, Frankfurt, Wetzlar, Hanau, and Fulda, to form the new Grand Duchy of Frankfurt in 1810. Dalberg resigned in 1813 and in 1815 the Congress of Vienna divided his territories between the Kingdom of Bavaria, the Electorate of Hesse-Kassel (or Hesse-Cassel), the Grand Duchy of Hesse and the Free City of Frankfurt.

The modern Roman Catholic Diocese of Mainz was founded in 1802 when Mainz lost its archdiocese status and its territory west of the Rhine River became a mere diocese within the territory of France. In 1814 its jurisdiction was extended over the territory of Hesse-Darmstadt. Since then it has had two cardinals and via various concordats was allowed to retain the medieval tradition of the cathedral chapter electing a successor to the bishop.

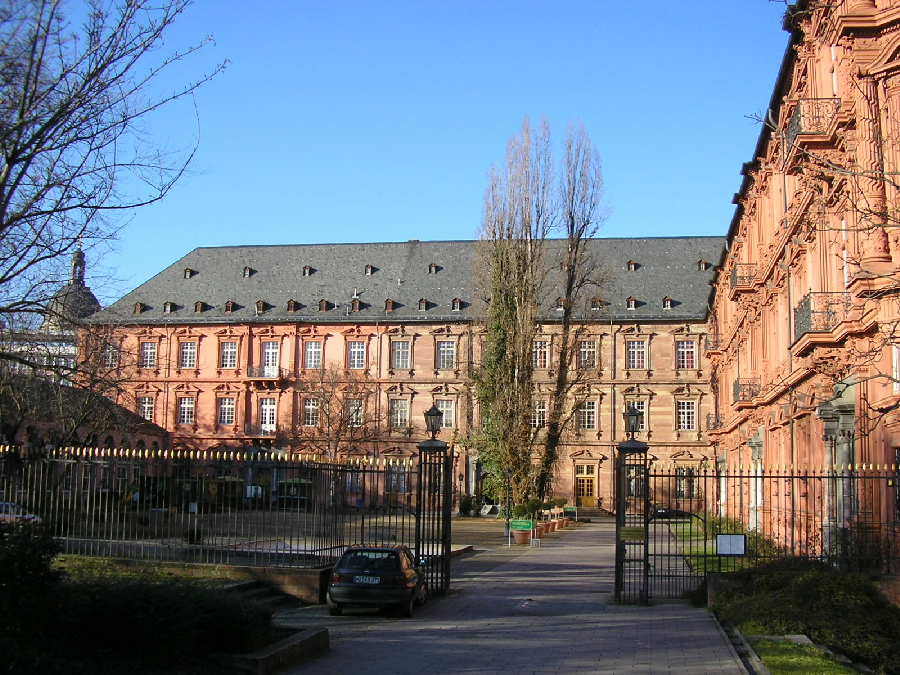
Electoral Palace, Mainz

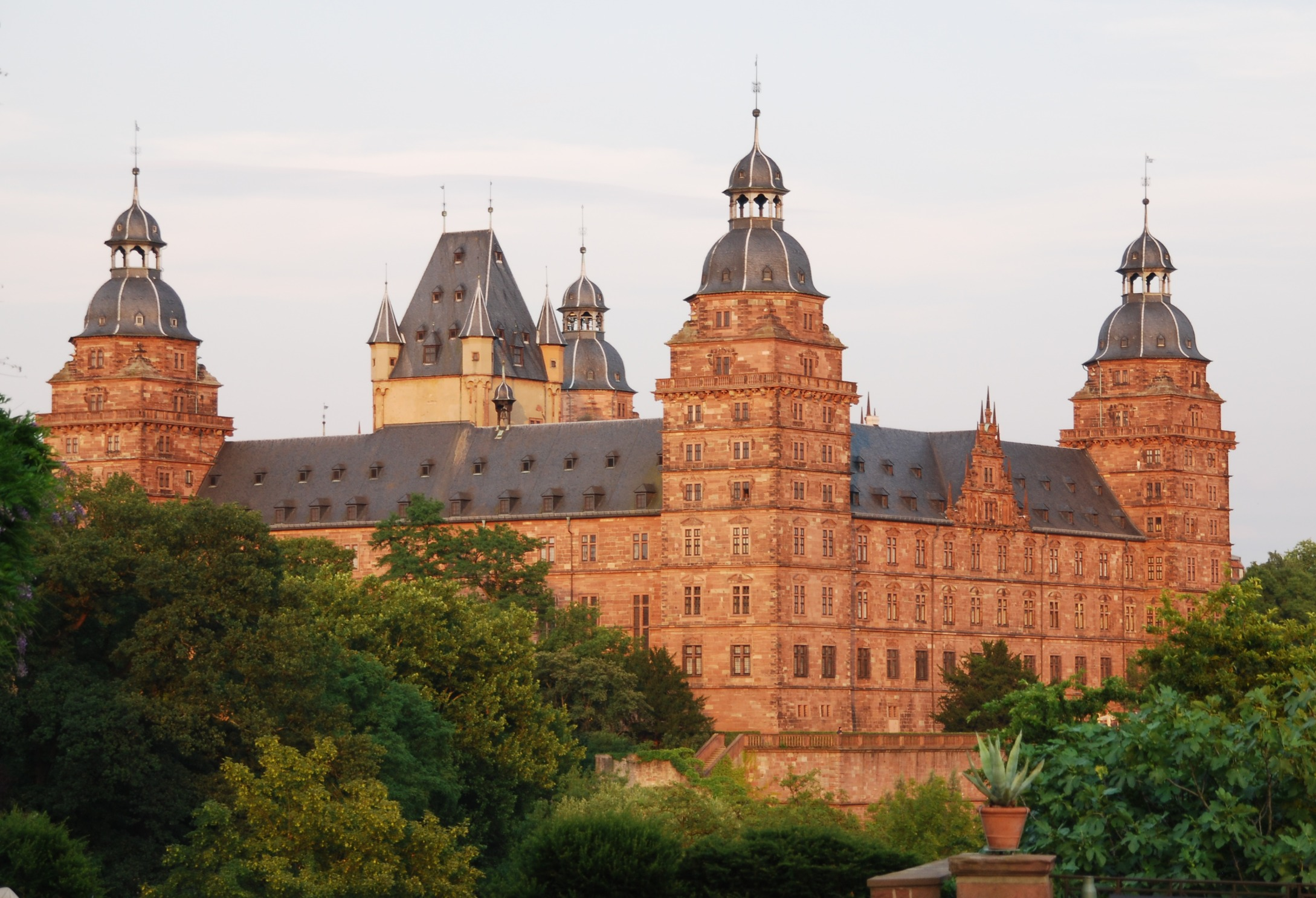
Schloss Johannisburg in Aschaffenburg

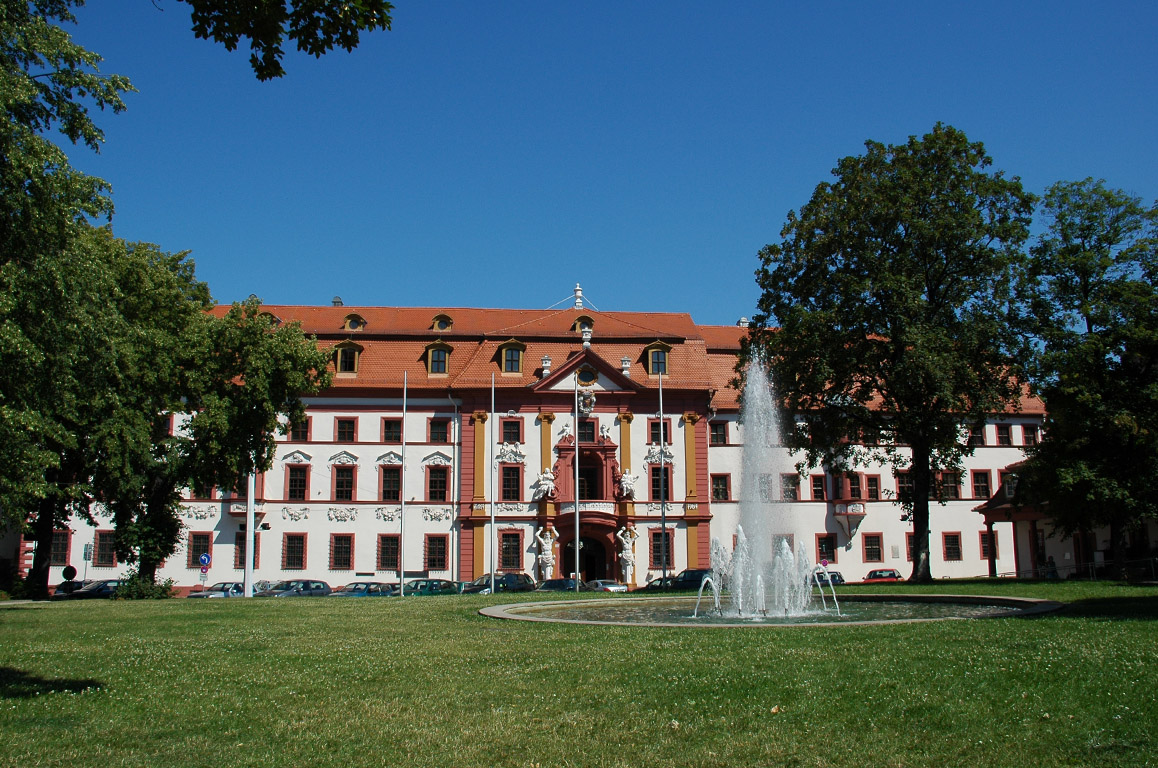
Palace of the Mainz Governors in Erfurt

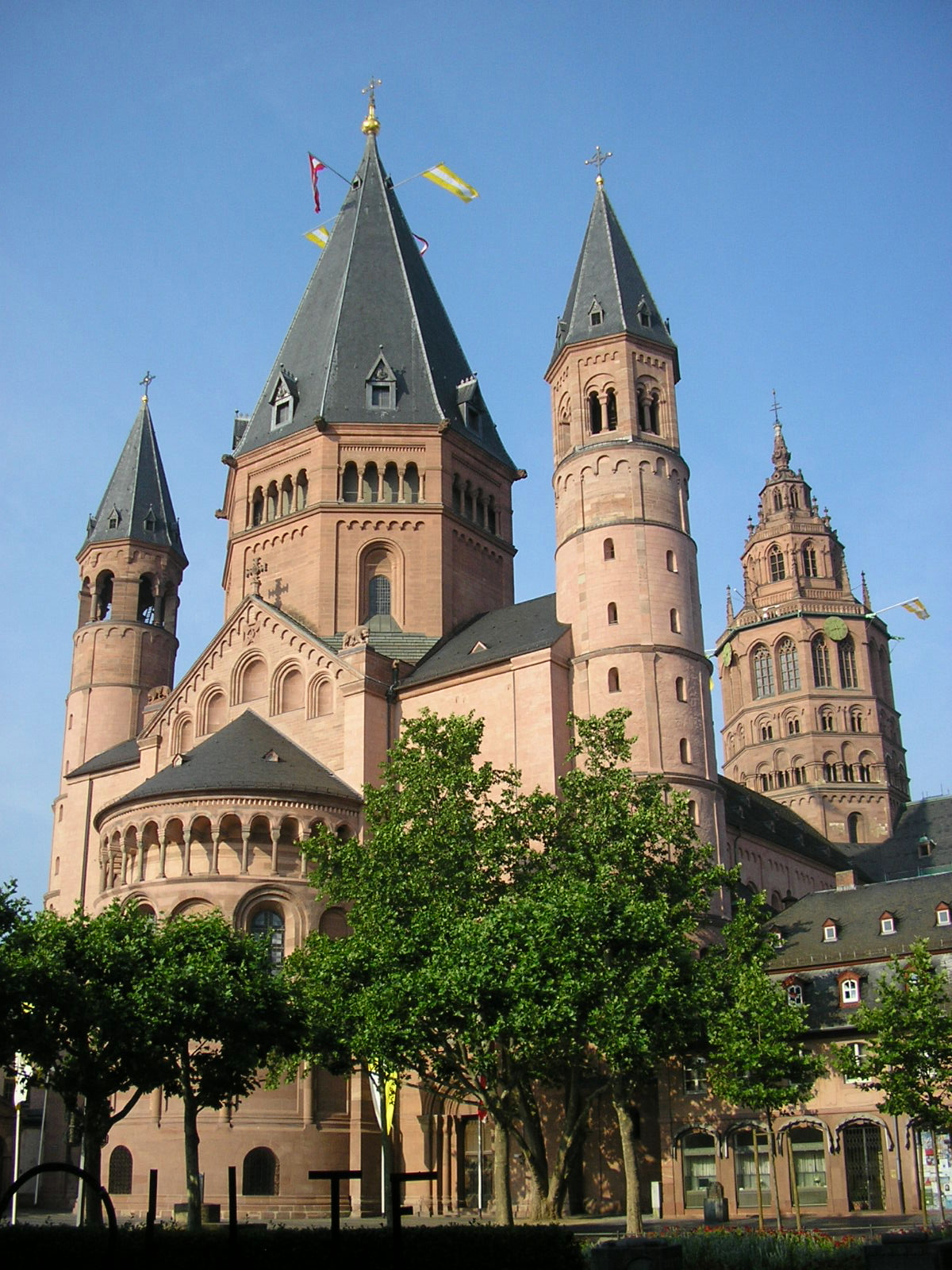
Mainz Cathedral

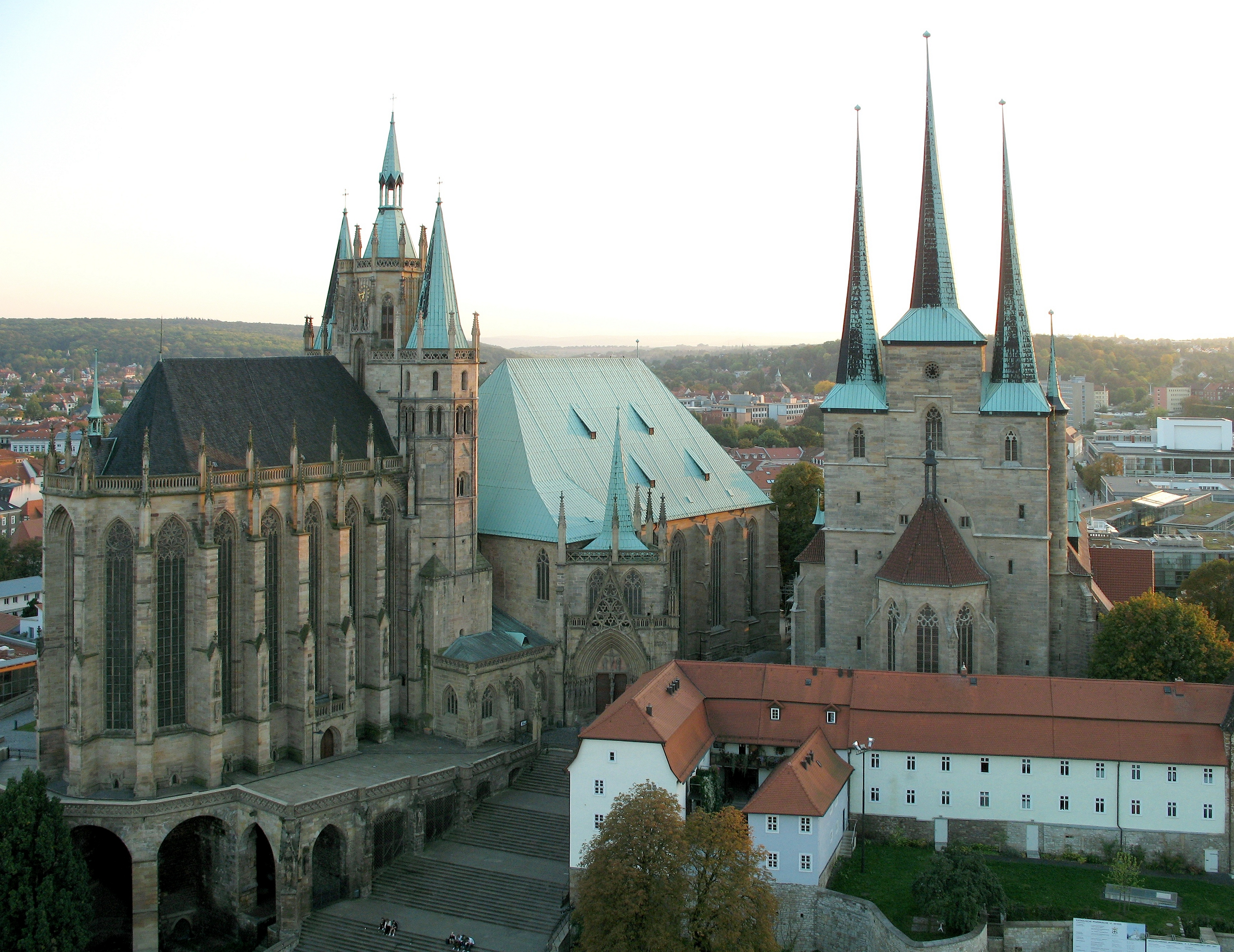
Erfurt Cathedral and St. Severus Church in Erfurt

== List of Archbishop-Electors of Mainz ==
See Elector of Mainz.

== See also ==
- Electorate of Cologne
- Electorate of Trier
