= Aegidienkirche, Heilbad Heiligenstadt =

Parish church in Heilbad Heiligenstadt, Germany

Coordinates: 51°22′36″N 10°08′11″E

The Aegidienkirche is a church dedicated to Saint Giles in the town of Heilbad Heiligenstadt, first built in 1227.

== Sources ==
- Homepage Pfarrgeminde St. Aegidien Heiligenstadt
