= Gewilib =

Roman Catholic bishop (died 758)

- Died: 758; Sponsheim
- Other names: Gewiliobus, Gewilip, Wieliebus
- Relatives: Geroldus of Mainz (father)
- Offices held: Bishop of the Roman Catholic Diocese of Mainz

Gewilib (died 758 in Sponsheim, also Gewiliobus, Gewilip, Wieliebus) was a bishop of the Roman Catholic Diocese of Mainz. He was the son of Geroldus of Mainz and his successor as a bishop. He was deposed by Saint Boniface in 745, who succeeded him.
