= Maternus Pistor =

German Roman Catholic prelate

Most Reverend Maternus Pistor
- Auxiliary Bishop of Mainz; Titular Bishop of Ascalon
- Church: Catholic Church
- Diocese: Diocese of Mainz
- In office: 1534

Personal details
- Born: 1470 Ingweiler, Germany
- Died: 5 September 1534 (aged 63–64) Mainz, Germany

Maternus Pistor (1470–1534) was a Roman Catholic prelate who served as Auxiliary Bishop of Mainz (1534).

== Biography ==
Maternus Pistorr was born in Ingweiler, Germany in 1470. On 19 Jan 1534, he was appointed during the papacy of Pope Clement VII as Auxiliary Bishop of Mainz and Titular Bishop of Ascalon. He served as Auxiliary Bishop of Mainz until his death on 5 Sep 1534.

== External links and additional sources ==
- Cheney, David M. "Diocese of Mainz". Catholic-Hierarchy.org. (for Chronology of Bishops) ^{[self-published]}
- Chow, Gabriel. "Diocese of Mainz (Germany)". GCatholic.org. (for Chronology of Bishops) ^{[self-published]}
