= Philipp Wasserburg =

German writer and publicist (1827–1897)

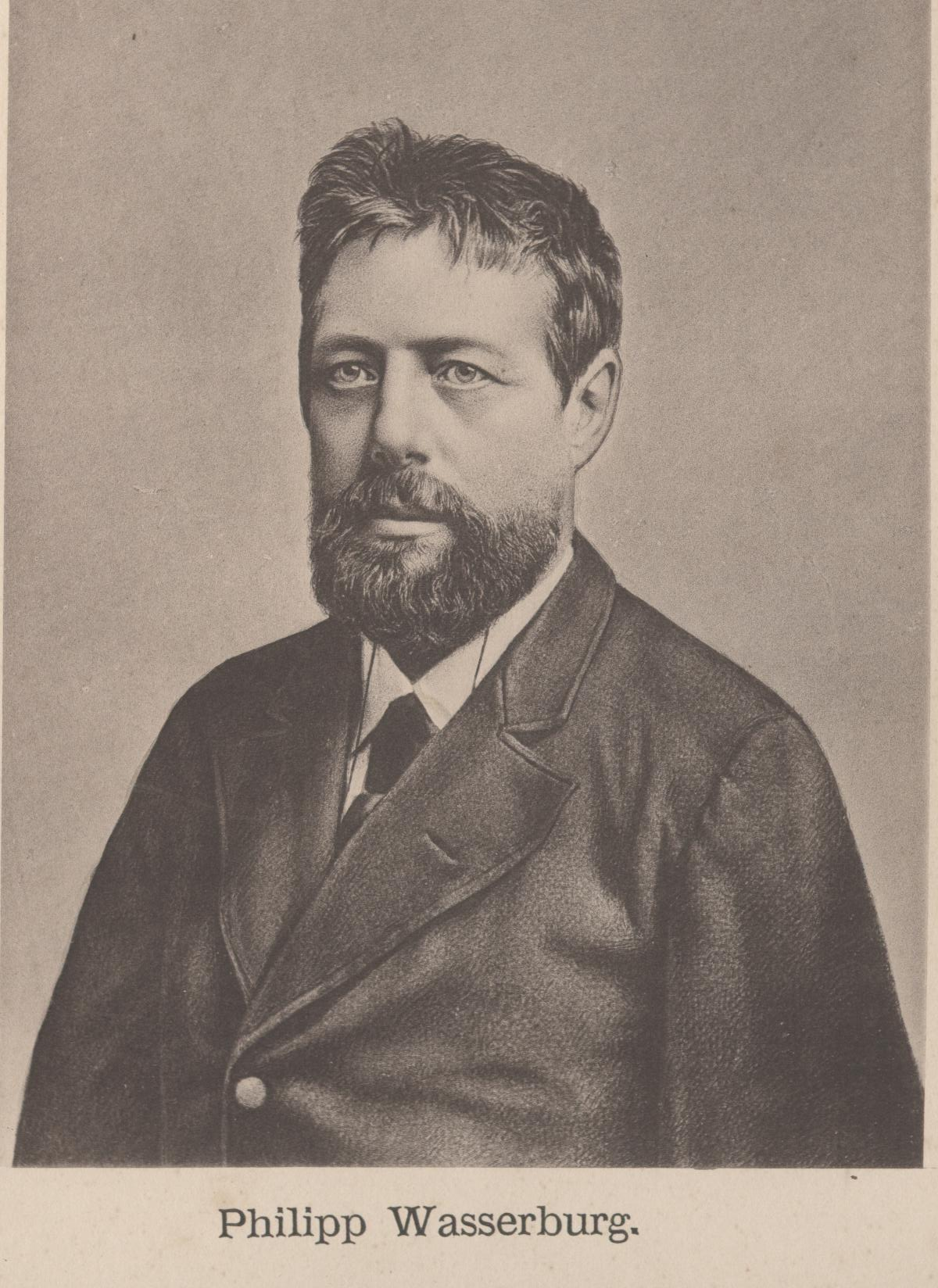
Philipp Wasserburg, Photographie, 1878

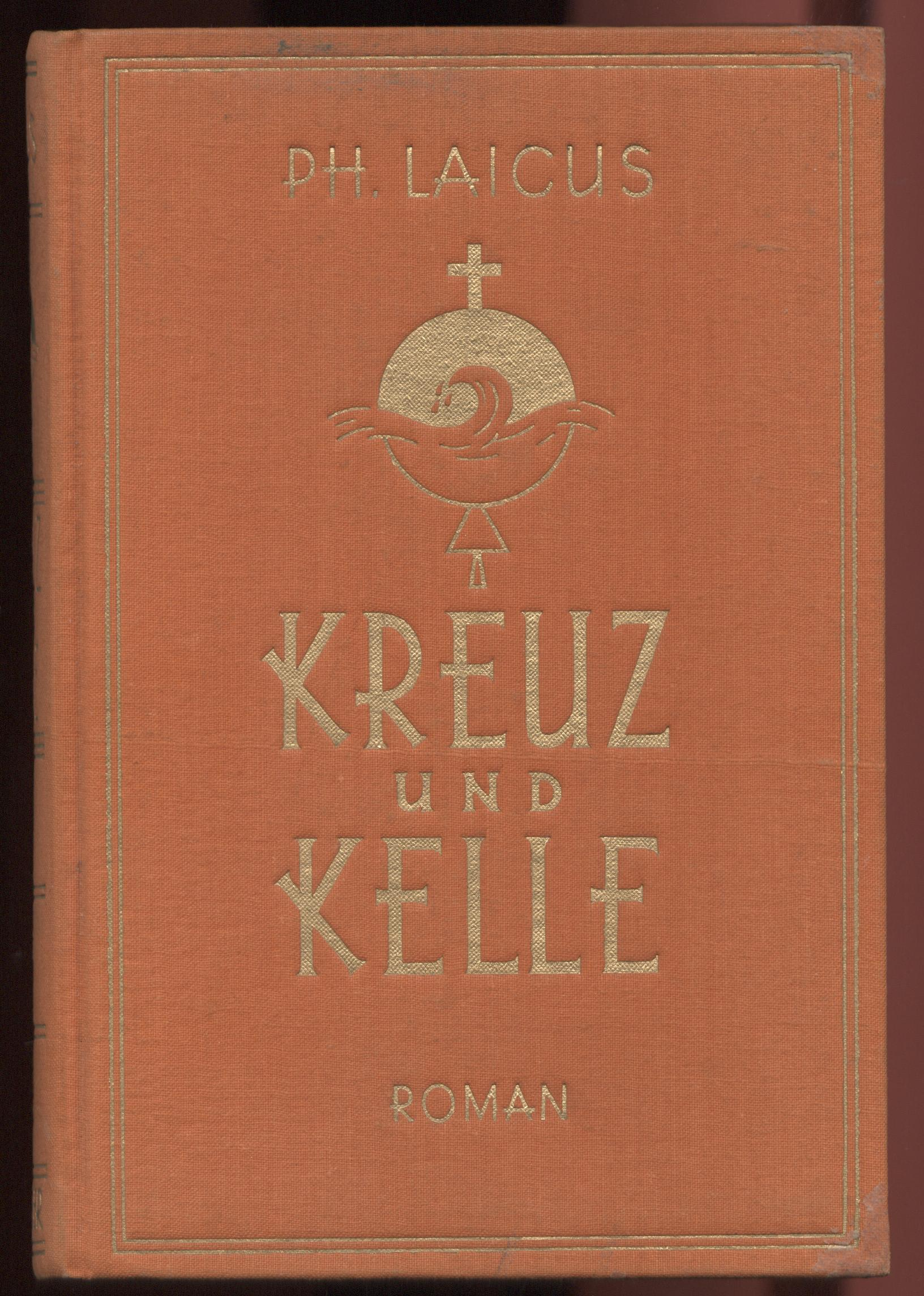
Philipp Wasserburg, alias Philipp Laicus, Kreuz und Kelle (1887), new edition 1927

Philipp Wasserburg (11 October 1827, Mainz - 13 April 1897, Gonsenheim) was a German Roman Catholic writer, publicist and member of the parliament of Hesse. He wrote under the pseudonym Philipp Laicus.

== Selected works ==
- Gedichte. Gießen 1850.
- Rosen und Dornen aus dem Leben Papst Pius IX. Kirchheim, Mainz 1868.
- Liberale Phrasen, beleuchtet. Kirchheim, Mainz 1871.
- Ringende Mächte. Ein socialer Roman aus der Gegenwart. Kirchheim, Mainz 1872.
- Silvio, ein Roman aus den Tagen von Mentana. Kirchheim, Mainz 1873.
- Zur rechten Stunde. Eine Erzählung aus dem amerikanischen Pflanzerleben. 1876.
- Wilhelm Emmanuel Freiherr von Ketteler, Bischof von Mainz. Eine kurze Lebensskizze. 2. Auflage. Kirchheim, Mainz 1877.
- Die Rose vom Wetternsee. Historischer Roman. 1880.
- Auf dunklen Pfaden zu lichten Höh'n. Geschichtlicher Roman. 1884.
- Der letzte Häuptling von Killarney. Eine historische Erzählung. 1884.
- Kreuz und Kelle. Roman aus der jüngsten Vergangenheit. Benziger, Einsiedeln 1887.
- Madonna di Tirano. Eine Veltliner Geschichte aus der Reformationszeit. 1888.
- Kreuz und Halbmond. Geschichtlicher Roman. 1889.
- Der letzte König der Gothen. Geschichtlicher Roman. 1891.
- Etwas später! Fortsetzung von Bellamy's Rückblick aus dem Jahre 2000. Kirchheim, Mainz 1891.
- Die Reichthümer der Enterbten. 1892.
- Haus Cardigan. Historische Erzählung. 1893.
- Kaiser oder Papst. Historischer Roman. 1893.
- Sonntagsheiligung – Sonntagsruhe. 1894.
- Der Niedergang der romanischen Völker. 1895.
- Die fünf Wunden Europas. 1895.
- Im blutigen Ringen. Historische Erzählung aus der Mitte des 10. Jahrhunderts. 1897.
