= Heinrich Hopfgarten =

German Roman Catholic prelate

Most Reverend Heinrich Hopfgarten
- Auxiliary Bishop of Mainz; Titular Bishop of Rhosus
- Church: Catholic Church
- Diocese: Diocese of Mainz
- In office: 1455–1460

Orders
- Consecration: 13 Jul 1456

Personal details
- Born: Erfurt, Germany
- Died: 24 March 1460 Mainz, Germany

Heinrich Hopfgarten, O.S.A. (died 1460) was a Roman Catholic prelate who served as Auxiliary Bishop of Mainz (1455–1460) and Titular Bishop of Rhosus (1455–1460).

== Biography ==
Heinrich Hopfgarten was born in Erfurt, Germany and ordained a priest in the Order of Saint Augustine. On 21 Nov 1455, he was appointed during the papacy of Pope Eugene IV as Auxiliary Bishop of Mainz and Titular Bishop of Rhosus. On 13 Jul 1456, he was consecrated bishop. He served as Auxiliary Bishop of Mainz until his death on 24 Mar 1460 in Mainz, Germany.

== External links and additional sources ==
- Cheney, David M. "Diocese of Mainz". Catholic-Hierarchy.org. (for Chronology of Bishops) ^{[self-published]}
- Chow, Gabriel. "Diocese of Mainz (Germany)". GCatholic.org. (for Chronology of Bishops) ^{[self-published]}
- Cheney, David M. "Rhosus (Titular See)". Catholic-Hierarchy.org. (for Chronology of Bishops) ^{[self-published]}
- Chow, Gabriel. "Titular Episcopal See of Rhosus (Turkey)". GCatholic.org. (for Chronology of Bishops) ^{[self-published]}

Catholic Church titles
Preceded by Jean Matthieu	Titular Bishop of Rhosus; 1455–1460	Succeeded by Daniel
Preceded by	Auxiliary Bishop of Mainz; 1455–1460	Succeeded by
