= Valentin Mohr =

German clergyman and bishop

Valentin Mohr (born 1560 in Aschaffenburg) was a German clergyman and bishop for the Roman Catholic Diocese of Speyer. He was ordained in 1587. He was appointed bishop in 1606. He died in 1608.
