= Hermann von Gehrden =

German Roman Catholic prelate

Most Reverend Hermann von Gehrden
- Auxiliary Bishop of Mainz; Titular Bishop of Citrus
- Church: Catholic Church
- Diocese: Diocese of Mainz
- In office: 1432–1471

Personal details
- Died: 9 November 1471 Warburg, Germany

Hermann von Gehrden, O.P. (died 1471) was a Roman Catholic prelate who served as Auxiliary Bishop of Mainz (1431–1471) and Titular Bishop of Citrus (1431–1471).

He was ordained a priest in the Order of Preachers. On 26 Mar 1431, Gehrden was appointed during the papacy of Pope Eugene IV as Auxiliary Bishop of Mainz and Titular Bishop of Citrus. He died on 9 November 1471 in Warburg, Germany.

== External links and additional sources ==
- Cheney, David M. "Diocese of Mainz". Catholic-Hierarchy.org. (for Chronology of Bishops) ^{[self-published]}
- Chow, Gabriel. "Diocese of Mainz (Germany)". GCatholic.org. (for Chronology of Bishops) ^{[self-published]}
- Cheney, David M. "Citrus (Titular See)". Catholic-Hierarchy.org. (for Chronology of Bishops) ^{[self-published]}
- Chow, Gabriel. "Titular Episcopal See of Citrus (Greece)". GCatholic.org. (for Chronology of Bishops) ^{[self-published]}

Catholic Church titles
Preceded by	Titular Bishop of Citrus; 1431–1471	Succeeded by
Preceded by	Auxiliary Bishop of Mainz; 1431–1471	Succeeded by
