= Sigfried Piscator =

German Roman Catholic prelate

Most Reverend Sigfried Piscator
- Auxiliary Bishop of Mainz; Titular Bishop of Cyrene
- Church: Catholic Church
- Diocese: Diocese of Mainz
- In office: 1446–1455 and 1462–1473

Personal details
- Born: 1411 Mainz, Germany
- Died: 16 Oct 1473 (age 62) Mainz, Germany

Sigfried Piscator, O.P. (1411–1473) was a Roman Catholic prelate who served as Auxiliary Bishop of Mainz (1446–1455 and 1462–1473); and Titular Bishop of Cyrene (1446–1473).

== Biography ==
Sigfried Piscator was born in Mainz, Germany in 1411 and ordained a priest in the Order of Preachers. On 7 Mar 1446, he was appointed during the papacy of Pope Eugene IV as Auxiliary Bishop of Mainz and Titular Bishop of Cyrene. He resigned in Sep 1455. On 27 Mar 1462, he was again appointed as Auxiliary Bishop of Mainz during the papacy of Pope Pius II where he served until his death on 16 Oct 1473.

== External links and additional sources ==
- Cheney, David M. "Diocese of Mainz". Catholic-Hierarchy.org. (for Chronology of Bishops) ^{[self-published]}
- Chow, Gabriel. "Diocese of Mainz (Germany)". GCatholic.org. (for Chronology of Bishops) ^{[self-published]}
- Cheney, David M. "Cyrene (Titular See)". Catholic-Hierarchy.org. (for Chronology of Bishops) ^{[self-published]}
- Chow, Gabriel. "Titular Episcopal See of Cyrene (Libya)". GCatholic.org. (for Chronology of Bishops) ^{[self-published]}

Catholic Church titles
Preceded by	Titular Bishop of Cyrene; 1446–1473	Succeeded by
Preceded by	Auxiliary Bishop of Mainz; 1446–1455 and 1462–1473	Succeeded by
