= Johannes Bonemilch =

German Roman Catholic prelate

Most Reverend Johannes Bonemilch
- Auxiliary Bishop of Mainz; Titular Bishop of Sidon
- Church: Catholic Church
- Diocese: Diocese of Mainz
- In office: 1497–1508

Orders
- Consecration: 13 Dec 1497

Personal details
- Died: 17 October 1510 Mainz, Germany

Johannes Bonemilch (died 1510) was a Roman Catholic prelate who served as Auxiliary Bishop of Mainz (1497–1510).

== Biography ==
On 4 Dec 1497, Johannes Bonemilch was appointed during the papacy of Pope Alexander VI as Auxiliary Bishop of Mainz and Titular Bishop of Sidon. On 13 Dec 1497, he was consecrated bishop. He served as Auxiliary Bishop of Mainz until his resignation in Apr 1508. He died on 17 Oct 1510.

== External links and additional sources ==
- Cheney, David M. "Diocese of Mainz". Catholic-Hierarchy.org. (for Chronology of Bishops) ^{[self-published]}
- Chow, Gabriel. "Diocese of Mainz (Germany)". GCatholic.org. (for Chronology of Bishops) ^{[self-published]}
