= Theonistus =

Italian bishop and saint

Saint Theonistus

Martyr
- Died: 4th or 5th centuries Roncade or Altino
- Major shrine: Relics are in the cathedral of Treviso and in San Lorenzo in Venice.
- Feast: At Treviso, his feast day is celebrated on October 30 or October 23.

Theonistus (Theonist, Teonesto, Thaumastus, Thaumastos, Theonestus, Thonistus, Onistus, Teonisto, Tonisto) is a saint venerated by the Catholic Church. Theonistus is venerated with two companions, Tabra and Tabratha (also Tabraham and Tubraham). Medieval documents give accounts of his life, which are contradictory and confusing.

His legend is very confused and complex. He may have been a martyr at the end of the 4th or end of the 5th century. His legend is presented in a shorter, older version of the 10th century, which calls him a bishop of an island called Namsia or Namsis, and a longer version of the 11th century, which calls him a bishop of Philippi.

According to the 11th-century account, Theonistus, along with Alban of Mainz, Tabra, Tabratha, and Ursus, attended a council in Carthage (the Council of Carthage of 670, but the chronology is confused), and then went on a pilgrimage to Rome. They then met Ambrose at Milan, and were sent to serve as missionaries to Gallia. Ursus was killed either at Aosta (according to the older account) or Augsburg (according to the 11th-century account). Albinus was beheaded by the Arians at Mainz and was a cephalophore. A miracle allowed Theonistus, Tabra, and Tabratha to escape from Mainz, and they managed to reach either Gothia (10th century version) or Gallia (11th-century version), and then reached Otranto (10th-century version) or Sicily (11th-century version). Finally, they were martyred at Roncade or Altino by beheading, and were also said to have been cephalophores.

The chronological information in the sources is contradictory. Bede dates their martyrdom to the time of Diocletian (ca. 303), while Rabanus and Notker the Stammerer date their martyrdom to the time of Theodosius II. However, their martyrdom may also date to the time of Hunneric (477-484).

As evidenced by their African names, Tabra and Tabratha may have been African martyrs whose relics arrived at Altino or Treviso during the persecutions of the Arian Vandals. Theonistus' cultus in Italy is attested by the foundation of a monastery dedicated to him in 710 (San Teonesto); the monastery's privileges were confirmed by Conrad II.

At Treviso, Theonistus and his companions are first mentioned in a local calendar of 1184; Theonistus is venerated and depicted in local towns such as Possagno and Trevignano.

Their association with Alban may have come from confusion with Theonistus (or Theomastus, Thaumaustus), an early fifth century bishop of Mainz (feast day: January 1). This figure is mentioned by Gregory of Tours: "Theomastus was noted for his holiness in accordance with the meaning of his name, and he is said to have been bishop of Mainz. For some unknown reason, he was expelled from Mainz and went to Poitiers. There he ended his present life by remaining in a pure confession.” The grave of this Theonistus was attested to in 791 AD. According to one scholar, “Albanus of Mentz, martyred at Mentz no one knows when, according to Baeda under Diocletian also, according to Sigebert (in Chron.), who says he had been driven from Philippi with Theonistus its bishop, in 425.” This scholar goes on to write that Rabanus Maurus “goes so far abroad as to call [Alban] an African bishop flying from Hunneric...”

There is another martyr by this name, Theonistus of Vercelli (feast day: November 20) (Vercelli has a church named Santi Tommaso e Teonesto in S. Paolo). All three figures’ histories may have been confused.

The relics of Theonistus and his two companions may also have been enshrined with those associated with Liberalis of Treviso at the cathedral of Torcello after 639 AD.

Theonistus' cultus remained strong. In the early 19th century, inhabitants of Trevignano hung a picture depicting Jerome at the feet of Theonistus. Villagers of Falzé, whose patron saint was Jerome, protested to the bishop about this "insolent picture".
