= List of people from Mainz =

This is a list of notable people who were born in or associated with Mainz.

== Sons and daughters of the town ==
(chronological list)

- around 780, Rabanus Maurus, † 856, a Benedictine monk, and archbishop of Mainz. He was the author of the encyclopaedia On the Nature of Things
- (c. 960 -1040? or 1028?) Gershom ben Judah, also commonly known by the longer title "Rabbeinu Gershom Me'Or Hagolah" ("Our teacher Gershom the light of the exile"), a famous Talmudist and Halakhist
- around 1397, Johannes Gutenberg (also Johannes Gensfleisch zur Laden), † February 3, 1468 in Mainz, a goldsmith and inventor. He achieved fame for his invention of the technology of printing with movable types during 1447
- ? Johann Fust († 1466 in Paris), an early German printer, assistant and investor of Gutenberg. Together with Peter Schöffer he founded a printshop
- 1488, Otto Brunfels, a German theologian and botanist. Carl von Linné listed him among the "Fathers of Botany"
- 1674, Friedrich Carl von Schönborn († 1746), bishop of Bamberg and Würzburg (1729–46)
- 1745, Ludwig Fischer, † July 19, 1825 in Berlin, opera singer
- 1750, Wolfgang Heribert von Dalberg, † September 28, 1806 in Mannheim, chamberlain of Worms and intendant of the theatre at Mannheim
- Ferdinand Ochsenheimer (1767–1822) was a German stage actor and entomologist (lepidopterist)
- 1779, October 8, Johann Baptist Ziz, † December 1, 1829, botanist
- 1780, Johann Adam Ackermann, † 1853, landscape painter
- 1791, Franz Bopp, 1867 in Berlin, German linguist, author of comparative studies on Indo-European languages
- 1799, Friedrich Heinrich von Kittlitz (1799 in Breslau – 1874 in Mainz), artist, naval officer, explorer and naturalist.
- 1805, Ida, Countess von Hahn-Hahn was a German author and founder of a nunnery
- 1809, August 19, Sabine Heinefetter, 18 November 1872, operatic soprano
- 1811, Josef Kling, was a German chess master and chess composer
- 1815, November 21, Karl Ludwig Bernays, Marxist journalist
- 1815, 2 April, Johann Baptist Heinefetter, 4 November 1902, Romantic painter
- 1817, Christoph Moufang, † 1890 in Mainz, diocesan administrator of Mainz 1877-86
- 1823, Ludwig Bamberger, † 1899 in Berlin, was an economist, publicist and politician. He took part in the republican rising in the Palatinate and Baden; it was chiefly owing to him that a gold currency was adopted and that the Reichsbank took form
- 1824, Peter Cornelius, † 1874 in Mainz, composer, writer about music, poet and translator
- 1835, Paul Haenlein, † 1905 in Mainz, was an engineer and flight pioneer. He flew in a semi-rigid-frame dirigible
- 1838, in Mainz, Charles Hallgarten, † 1908 in Frankfurt am Main, was a banker and philanthropist
- 1839, Adolphus Busch, † 1913 was the cofounder of Anheuser-Busch
- 1846, Ferdinand Becker, † 1877, painter of religious subjects
- 1849, May 29, Lorenz Adlon, † April 7, 1921, established Hotel Adlon in Berlin
- 1858, July 2, Georg Heinrich Kirstein, † April 15, 1921 in Mainz, bishop of Mainz 1904-21
- 1862, Hugo Ganz (1862-1922), journalist
- 1883, Emil Preetorius, † 1973 in Munich, painter and scenic designer, 1948 – 1968 president of the Bayerischen Akademie der Schönen Künste
- 1883, Adolf Reinach, German philosopher, phenomenologist (from the Munich phenomenology perspective) and law theorist
- 1871, Oskar Heinroth, Ornithologist
- 1873, Rudolf Rocker, † 1958 in Mohegan/Maine (USA); was an anarcho-syndicalist writer, historian and prominent activist
- 1888, 17 November, Curt Goetz, † 12 September 1960 in Grabs/St. Gallen (Switzerland), Schriftsteller ("Der Lügner und die Nonne", "Das Haus in Montevideo"), playwright, film director
- 1892, 6 January Ludwig Berger originally Ludwig Bamberger, † 1969 in Schlangenbad, film director, Shakespeare interpreter
- 1900, Anna Seghers, † 1983 in Berlin (East), writer ("Das siebte Kreuz")
- 1901, Walter Hallstein, † 1982 in Stuttgart, politician and professor (Hallstein Doctrine) (1950–1951)
- 1904, 30 December, Edith Schultze-Westrum, † 20 March 1981 in München, actress ("Die Brücke", D 1959, "Jeder stirbt für sich allein", Hans Fallada 1962)
- 1914, 25 December, Konrad Georg, † 8 September 1987 in Hamburg, actor ("Kommissar Freytag", "Tim Frazer")
- 1916, Ferdy Mayne, † 1998 in London, actor
- 1920, 3 November, Peter Ganz, Germanist
- 1924. Lewis H Gann, Historian of Africa
- 1924, 11 December, Heinz Schenk, †2014, actor, singer ("Es ist alles nur geliehen"), Moderator ("Zum blauen Bock"), text writer ("Ole, ole Fiesta")
- 1935, 4 October, Horst Janson, actor ("Der Bastian", Sesamstraße)
- 1938, 25 February, Dieter Reith, composer (TV-melodies), band leader
- 1942, 18 April, Jochen Rindt, † 1970 Austrian racing driver
- 1947, 31 December, Gerhard Ludwig Müller
- 1961, 6 December, Manuel Reuter, race car driver
- 1963, Matthias Fornoff, tv-journalist
- 1968, Anja Gockel, fashion designer

== Honorary citizens ==
- 1831: Dr. Georg Moller, Regierungsbaumeister (first honorary citizen)
- 1834: Emmanuel von Mensdorff-Pouilly, vice governor of the federal fortress Mainz
- 1835: Albert Thorvaldsen, Danish/Icelandic sculptor, creator of the Gutenbergdenkmal
- 1839: Prince Wilhelm of Prussia, vice governor of the federal fortress Mainz
- 1864 to 1866 Prince Charles of Prussia was governor of Mainz
- 1875: Leopold Hermann von Boyen, governor of the federal fortress Mainz
- 1877: Philipp Veit, romantic painter, director of the municipal gallery at Mainz
- 1908: Max von Gagern, administrative director of the province Rheinhessen
- 1962: Carl Zuckmayer, author
- 1964: Félix Kir, catholic priest, resistance fighter and politician
- 1965: Dr. Peter Altmeier, first prime minister of Rhineland-Palatinate, co-founder of the Second German Television
- 1970: Dr. Ludwig Strecker, director of Schott Music, publisher
- 1972: Prof. Fritz Strassmann, chemist who, along with Otto Hahn, and Lisa Meitner discovered the nuclear fission of uranium in 1938
- 1975: Hermann Kardinal Volk, Bishop of Mainz
- 1981: Marc Chagall, painter, created nine stained-glass windows in St. Stephan Mainz
- 1981: Anna Seghers, originally Netty Rádvany, geb. Reiling, author
- 1983: Prof. Karl Holzamer, first director general (Intendant) of the Second German Television
- 2001: Karl Kardinal Lehmann, Bishop of Mainz
- 2004: Karl Delorme, local politician
- 2022: Özlem Türeci, Uğur Şahin, Christoph Huber, BioNTech-founders

== Other people related specially to Mainz ==
=== Scientists ===
- Johann Joachim Becher (1635–1682), was a physician, alchemist, precursor of Chemistry, scholar, economist and adventurer
- Johann Georg Adam Forster naturalist, ethnologist, travel writer, journalist and revolutionary. Played a leading role in the Republic of Mainz 1793
- Johann Fischer von Waldheim, was a German anatomist, entomologist and paleontologist
- Victor Mordechai Goldschmidt (1853–1933), was a German mineralogist, crystallographer, nature philosopher, art collector and sponsor
- Gustav Killian (1860–1921), was a German laryngologist
- Romano Guardini (1885–1968), was a Roman Catholic priest, author, and academic
- Fritz Strassmann (1902–1980), was a chemist who, along with Otto Hahn, discovered the nuclear fission of uranium in 1938
- Otto Laporte (1902–1971) physicist
- Helmut Schoeck (1922–1993), was an Austrian-German sociologist and writer, best known for his work "Envy
- Paul J. Crutzen, is a Dutch Nobel Prize winning atmospheric chemist at the Max-Planck-Institut in Mainz
- Ludwig Lindenschmit the Elder (1809–1893), was an important prehistorian, a pioneer of prehistorian research during the 19th century, history painting, Lithography
- Wolfgang Seiler, biogeochemists and climatologists
- Uğur Şahin (born 1965), in Iskenderun, Turkey) immunologist and physician
- Özlem Türeci (born 1967), in Lastrup, immunologist and businessperson

=== Politicians ===
- Nero Claudius Drusus, Consul of the Roman Empire („Drusus-Cenotaph“ in the Zitadelle)
- Didius Julianus, Roman Emperor, commanded the Legio XXII Primigenia in Mogontiacum
- Marcus Aurelius Severus Alexander, Roman emperor (222–235) of the Severan dynasty.
- Ulpius Cornelius Laelianus was a usurper against Postumus, the emperor of the Gallic Empire. He declared himself emperor at Mainz in February/March 268
- Jean Bon Saint-André, was a French politician of the Revolution era, became préfet of the département of Mont-Tonnerre (1801) and commissary-general of the three départements on the left bank of the Rhine
- Franz Erwein von Schönborn-Wiesentheid (1776–1840), German politician and art collector
- Ludwig Schwamb (1890–1945) social-democratic jurist and politician who fought against the Nazi dictatorship in Germany as a member of the Kreisau Circle
- Helmut Kohl, politician
- Susanne Wasum-Rainer, diplomat, Germany’s Ambassador to France (since 2012)
- view: List of mayors of Mainz
- Katrin Eder (born 1976), politician (The Greens)
- Thomas Barth (born 1977), politician (CDU)
- Pia Schellhammer (born 1985), politician (The Greens)

=== Architecture, art and culture ===
- Hans Backoffen (1470–1519), kurfürstlicher Steinmetz und Bildhauer
- Gottfried Wilhelm Leibniz, Jurist, Mathematiker und Philosoph. Von 1667 – 1674 in Diensten Johann Philipps von Schönborn
- Maximilian von Welsch (1671–1745), electoral director of building, architect, military engineer, famed for his fortifications and civil architecture (Lustschloss Favorite Mainz, New Armory Mainz)
- Emy Roeder (1890–1971), sculptor, since 1950 teacher at the Mainzer Kunstgewerbeschule
- Alois Plum (born 1935), stained glass artist
- Margret Hofheinz-Döring (1910–1994), painter and graphic artist

=== Literature ===
- Marianus Scotus (1028–1082), Irish chronicler
- Kathinka Zitz (1801–1877), writer and political activist
- Siegmund Salfeld (1843–1926) German rabbi and writer
- Gerd Buchdahl (1914–2001), German-Jewish philosopher of science
- Harald Martenstein (born 1953), author, columnist at Die Zeit
- Hanns-Josef Ortheil, Mainz town chronist
- Friedrich Kellner (1885–1970), author of My Opposition

=== Sports ===
- Franco Foda, football manager
- Jürgen Klopp, football manager
- Manuel Reuter, racing driver, two-time 24 Hours of Le Mans winner (1989, 1996)
- Jochen Rindt, racing driver, posthumously won the Formula One World Drivers' Championship (in 1970)
- Martin Schmidt, football manager
- Katrin Schultheis, world champion 2007, 2008, 2009, 2011, 2012 artistic cycling
- Niko Springer, darts player
- Sandra Sprinkmeier, world champion 2007, 2008, 2009, 2011, 2012 artistic cycling
- Martin Steffes-Mies, four-time rowing world champion octuple (8x) (1989, 1990, 1991, 1993)
- Vincent Keymer, chess grandmaster

=== Economy ===
- Lorenz Adlon created the most luxurious hotel of his time, the Hotel Adlon
- Ludwig Bamberger (1823–1899), German banker
- Dr. Hans Friderichs, Bundesminister a. D.
- Salomon Oppenheim, Jr. (1772–1828), Jewish German banker. He is the founder of the private bank Sal Oppenheim.
- Alfonso Sancha (born 1965) German-Spanish executive, born in Mainz
- Beatrice Weder di Mauro, Johannes Gutenberg University of Mainz, Chair of International Macroeconomics Wirtschaftsweise

=== Religion ===
- refer to Bishop of Mainz
- Archbishopric of Mainz
- Yaakov ben Yakar (990 – 1064) was a Talmudist, pupil of Gershom ben Judah, and is especially known as the teacher of Rashi
- Yehuda ben Meir (also known as Yehuda ha-Kohen or Judah of Mainz was a German-Jewish rabbi, Talmudic scholar and traveler of the late 10th and early 11th century
- Karl von Miltitz (1490–1529) was a papal nuncio and a Mainz Cathedral canon
- Johann Michael Raich, was a Catholic theologian
- Adam Franz Lennig (1803–1866), ultramontanist, established in March 1848 the Piusverein and organized the first Katholikentag

=== Music, canto ===
- Heinrich von Meißen, called Frauenlob, was a Middle High German poet and Minnesinger. Since 1312 up to his death 1318 at Peter von Aspelts court in Mainz
- Marianne Müller, (1772–1851) soprano singer at the Königliches Theater of Berlin in 1789–1816
- Gottfried Weber (1799–1839) was a prominent writer on music, especially music theory
- Maria Wilhelmj (1856-1930), composer
- Peter Cornelius, composer, writer about music, poet and translator.
- Volker David Kirchner (1942–2020), violist and composer
- Gundula Krause, Folk violinist
- Tonka, House music disc jockey and record producer
- Josef Traxel (1916–1975), singer
- Aziza Mustafa Zadeh, Azerbaijani singer, pianist and composer
- Wolf Hoffmann, lead guitarist for Accept
- Ian Pooley, musician, record producer and DJ

=== Cabaret, comedian, carnivalist ===
- Hanns Dieter Hüsch, cabaret artist

=== Military ===
- Louis Baraguey d'Hilliers
- Franz von Weyrother
- Karl Freiherr von Thüngen

=== Others ===
- Marx Rumpolt, personal chef to the Elector of Mainz, in 1581 wrote the first textbook "Ein New Kochbuch" (A New Cookbook) for professional cooks.
- Johannes Wilhelm Bückler, called Schinderhannes (1783–1803), legendary German outlaw
- Christiane Lutz, operatic director
- Maria Einsmann (1885-1959), lived as a man 1919-1931 with her female partner and her children. After her real identity was discovered her case received international coverage.

== Sources ==
- Wolfgang Balzer: Mainz, Persönlichkeiten der Stadtgeschichte. Kügler, Ingelheim 1985–1993.
  - Bd. 1: Mainzer Ehrenbürger, Mainzer Kirchenfürsten, militärische Persönlichkeiten, Mainzer Bürgermeister. ISBN 3-924124-01-9
  - Bd. 2: Personen des religiösen Lebens, Personen des politischen Lebens, Personen des allgemein kulturellen Lebens, Wissenschaftler, Literaten, Künstler, Musiker. ISBN 3-924124-03-5.
  - Bd. 3: Geschäftsleute, epochale Wegbereiter, Baumeister, Fastnachter, Sonderlinge, Originale. ISBN 3-924124-05-1.
