= Fresenius =

Fresenius is a German surname. Notable people with the surname include:

- Carl Remigius Fresenius (1818–1897), German chemist
- Christian Fresenius (1749-1811), German Jurist and writer
- Eduard Fresenius ( (1874–1946), German businessman, founder of Fresenius
- Georg Fresenius (1808–1866), German botanist
- Wilhelm Fresenius (1913–2004), German chemist from Mainz

== See also ==
- Fresenius SE, a German health care company, or subsidiaries
