= Christoph Moufang =

German Catholic theologian and diocesan administrator

- Vicar Apostolic of Mainz
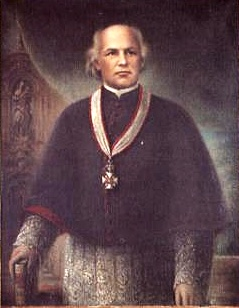
- Church: Catholic Church
- Diocese: Diocese of Mainz
- In office: 13 July 1877 – 10 June 1886
- Predecessor: Wilhelm Emmanuel von Ketteler
- Successor: Paul Leopold Haffner

Orders
- Ordination: 19 December 1839

Personal details
- Born: Franz Christoph Ignaz Moufang; 17 February 1817 Mainz, Grand Duchy of Hesse and by Rhine, German Confederation
- Died: 27 February 1890 (aged 73) Mainz, Grand Duchy of Hesse and by Rhine, German Empire

Franz Christoph Ignaz Moufang (17 February 1817 – 27 February 1890) was a German Catholic theologian and diocesan administrator.

== Life ==
=== Education ===
Moufang was born at Mainz, where he also received his primary education. In 1834 he entered the Rhenish Frederick William's University of Bonn, first taking up medicine, but soon turning to theology. Among his masters were Heinrich Klee, Karl Joseph Hieronymus Windischmann, and Ferdinand Walter. In 1837 he went to Munich, and then next year took the prescribed theological examinations at Gießen, after which he entered the ecclesiastical seminary at Mainz, where he was ordained to the priesthood on 19 December 1839.

Moufang's first appointment was as curate in Seligenstadt, where his uncle, Adam Franz Lennig, later vicar-general and dean of the Mainz Cathedral, was pastor. Lennig stimulated in him a broad interest for the religious questions of the time. Moufang also taught at the pro-gymnasium at Seligenstadt. After Seligenstadt he was charged with the parish of Bensheim, then of the parish at St. Quintin's Church, Mainz. In 1845 he became the religious instructor at the Mainz Gymnasium.

=== Mission ===
In 1854, Wilhelm Emmanuel von Ketteler, the Bishop of Mainz, re-established the philosophical and theological school in connexion with the seminary at Mainz. He appointed Moufang regent of the seminary, as well as professor of moral and pastoral theology.

Moufang became a canon on 6 November 1854. He was appointed as spiritual adviser and member of the diocesan court on 2 December of the same year. On the occasion of the twenty-fifth anniversary of his priesthood the theological faculty of Würzburg awarded him an honorary Doctor of Theology degree.

When Lennig died in 1866, von Ketteler asked Moufang to succeed Lennig as dean of the cathedral and vicar-general. Moufang declined, preferring to devote himself to the seminary. In November 1868 he was summoned to Rome for the preparatory work of the First Vatican Council, and was assigned to the committee for ecclesiastico-political matters under Karl-August von Reisach. In 1877, the theological school of the seminary was closed due to legislation in the Kulturkampf.

== Ordination ==
After the death of von Ketteler on 13 July 1877, the cathedral chapter elected Moufang bishop of the diocese. However, the Hessian grand ducal government refused to confirm his election, so Moufang served as administrator only. The ten years that he carried this charge while the seminary was shuttered were difficult for Moufang, primarily due to the hostile attitude of the government.

On 16 April 1886 Leo XIII made Moufang a domestic prelate. Under Bishop Paul Leopold Haffner, the theological school of the seminary was reopened on 25 October 1887, and Moufang again directed the seminary as regent, although he soon had to relinquish this charge due to poor health. He died in 1890.

== Legacy ==
Moufang rendered services to the diocese of Mainz as an educator of the clergy. He was prominent in the circle that centred about Lennig, and he took part in all efforts to improve religious and social conditions. He assisted in the formation of the Piusverein, and as a member of the "St. Vincenz-und Elisabeth-Verein" did much to promote its prosperity. In the regeneration of Catholic Germany his name is linked with the history of the general conventions (Generalversammlungen) of the Catholics of Germany - the Katholikentag. He was, for almost forty years, one of the leading personalities and most prominent speakers.

For a number of years Moufang was also active as a legislator. After 1863, as representative of the bishop, he had a seat in the upper chamber of the Hessian Landtag, and repeatedly took a prominent part in the debates on social and political questions, and questions of Catholic policy. In 1871 he entered the German Reichstag, where he was held in esteem by the Centre Party for his political services and as an intermediary in harmonizing the differences between North and South Germany.

== Literary work ==
The most prominent feature of Moufang's literary activity was his work in reorganizing and publishing the "Katholik", which in collaboration with Johann Baptist Heinrich he edited from 1851 until his death. He also paraphrased the Latin Easter hymn O filii et filiae into German as "Ihr Christen, singet hocherfreut" in 1865.

His other literary work was mainly in the history of the older Catholic catechisms in Germany. His chief works on this subject are:

- Die Mainzer Katechismen von Erfindung der Buchdruckerkunst bis zum Ende des 18. Jahrhunderts (Mainz, 1878)
- Katholische Katechismen des 16. Jahrhunderts in deutscher Sprache, editor and annotator (Mainz, 1881).

Among his numerous shorter writings are:

- Die barmherzigen Schwestern, eine Darstellung ihrer Gründung, Verbreitung, Einrichtung und Wirksamkeit (Mainz, 1842)
- Der Informativ-Prozess. Eine kirchenrechtliche Erörterung (Mainz, 1850)
- Die katholischen Pfarrschulen in der Stadt Mainz (Mainz, 1863)
- Das Verbot der Ehen zwischen nahen Verwandten. Beleuchtung der Gründe dieses Verbotes (Mainz, 1863)
- Die Handwerkerfrage (Mainz, 1864), a speech delivered in the Upper Chamber of the Landtag at Darmstadt and published with notes
- Die Kirche und die Versammlung katholischer Gelehrten (Mainz, 1864), a reply to Friedrich Bernhard Ferdinand Michelis's Kirche oder Partei
- Cardinal Wiseman und seine Verdienste um die Wissenschaft und die Kirche (Mainz, 1865)
- Der Kampf um Rom und seine Folgen für Italien und die Welt (Mainz, 1868)
- Carl August, Cardinal von Reisach, in "Katholic", 1870, I, 129-50
- Der besondere Schutz Gottes über Papst Pius IX (Mainz, 1871)
- Aktenstücke betreffend die Jesuiten in Deutschland, gesammelt und mit Erläuterungen versehen (Mainz, 1872).

Moufang also published a widely used prayerbook, Officium divinum, which has passed through numerous editions, the first in 1851, the nineteenth in 1905.

== See also ==
- Aloys Karl Ohler, a colleague
