= Adam Franz Lennig =

German Catholic theologian

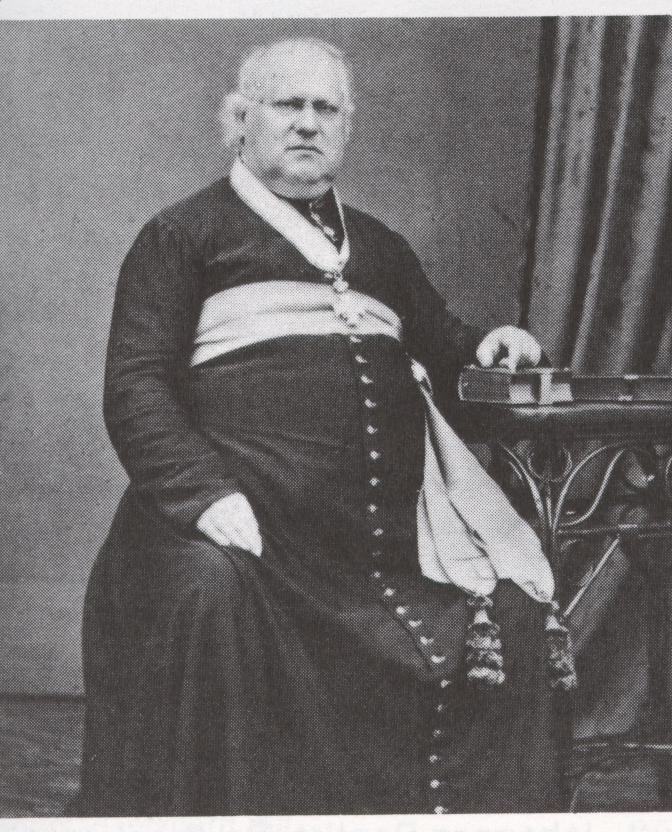
Adam Franz Lennig.

Adam Franz Lennig (3 December 1803 – 22 November 1866) was an ultramontane German Catholic theologian. He was born and died in Mainz.

== Life ==
Lennig studied at Bruchsal under the private tutorship of the ex-Jesuit Laurentius Doller, and afterwards at the bishop's gymnasium at Mainz, his birthplace. Being too young for ordination, he went to Paris to study Semitic languages under Sylvestre de Sacy, then to Rome for a higher course in theology. Here he was ordained priest, 22 September 1827, and then taught for a year at Mainz.

Lennig was a strenuous defender of the rights of the Roman Catholic Church, and when on 30 January 1830, the Government of the Grand Duchy of Hesse — which for quite a time had been trying to interfere in church matters — passed thirty-nine articles on ecclesiastical administration, he sent them to Rome. Rome sent back a protest, but, since the bishops remained silent, and since Joseph Vitus Burg, Bishop of Mainz, even defended the articles, Lennig left for Bonn, and attended the lectures of Johann Michael Sailer, Windischmann, and Klee.

In June 1832, he accepted the pastorate of Gaulsheim, now part of Bingen am Rhein, declining to take the chair of theology and exegesis at Mainz. In 1839 he was made pastor at Seligenstadt. Petrus Leopold Kaiser, Bishop of Mainz, in 1845 promoted him to the cathedral chapter.

As a mentor of the ultramontanism, he established in March 1848 the Piusverein (Pius Association). He organized the first Katholikentag (meeting of Catholic societies and of Catholics in general), held at Mainz, October 1848. In the same month he was present at the conference of the German Bishops at Würzburg, acting as representative of his bishop who was ill. About this time he founded at great expense the Mainzer Journal.

After the death of Bishop Kaiser (30 December 1848), troubles arose about the choice of a successor. Lennig was acknowledged by all as a leader of true Christian spirit and suffered much abuse from the Liberals. In 1852 he was made vicar general by Bishop Wilhelm Emmanuel von Ketteler, and in 1856 dean of the chapter. He zealously assisted his bishop in bringing the Capuchins and Jesuits into the diocese. In 1854 he was in Rome at the definition of the Immaculate Conception, and later visited Rome twice.

In 1859 he wrote a protest against the spoliation of the Holy See, and had it signed by 20,000 Catholics.

He is buried at the Hauptfriedhof Mainz.

His older brother, Friedrich Lennig, was a popular comic poet.

== Works ==
Lennig published in 1849 his "Panegyric on Bishop Kaiser", and in 1862 his "Funeral Oration on the Archduchess Mathilde of Hesse". His meditations on the Passion and on the Our Father and Hail Mary were published 1867 and 1869 by his nephew, Christoph Moufang.
