= Johann Michael Raich =

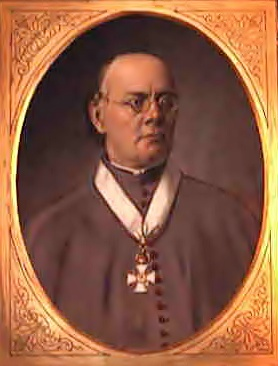
Johann Michael Raich

Johann Michael Raich (Ottobeuren in Bavaria, 17 January 1832 – Mainz, 28 March 1907) was a Catholic theologian.

== Biography ==
Raich pursued his high school gymnasial studies under the Benedictines at St. Stephen's in Augsburg, and studied philosophy and theology at the Collegium Germanicum in Rome (1852-5). On 29 May 1858, he was ordained a priest at the same place. In the autumn of 1859 he left Rome and went to Mainz as secretary of Bishop von Ketteler. He accompanied the bishop on journeys and thus was at Rome during the [First] Vatican Council. He was also named a cathedral prebend on 4 May 1867. After the death of Bishop von Ketteler, during the years of the "Culture clash" Kulturkampf, Raich had a position in the episcopal Chancery. On 29 November 1890 Bishop Paul Leopold Haffner appointed him cathedral canon, and on 11 April 1900, he became cathedral dean.

== Published works ==
Raich's writings include:

- "Döllinger's Rebellion Against the Church and its Authority" (Die Auflehnung Döllingers gegen die Kirche u. ihre Autotät) (Mainz, 1871)
- "About the Age of First Communicants" (Ueber das Alter der Erstcommunicanten) (Mainz, 1875)
- "Shakespeare's Attitude Toward the Catholic Religion" (Shakespeare's Stellung zur katholischen Religion (Mainz, 1884)
- "The Inner Falsehood of Freemasonry" (Die innere Unwahrheit der Freimaurerei) (first issued at Mainz, 1884, under the pseudonym of Otto Beuren; 2nd ed. under his own name Raich, 1897)
- "St. Augustine and the Creation Account of Moses" (St. Augustinus u. der Mosaische Schöpfungsbericht) (Frankfort-on-Main, 1889)

Besides these original works he edited the following:

- Bruno Franz Leopold Liebermann's "Theological institutions" (Institutiones theologicæ) (10th ed., 2 vols., Mainz, 1870)
- John Maldonati's "Commentaries on the Four Evangelists" (Commentarii in quatuor Evangelistas) (new ed., 2 vols., Mainz, 1874)
- "Sermons by Bishop von Ketteler" (Predigten des Bischofs von Ketteler) (2 vols., Mainz, 1878)
- "Correspondence of Wilhelm Emmanuel Baron von Ketteler, Bishop of Mainz" (Briefe von u. an Wilhelm Emmanuel Freiherrn von Ketteler, Bischof von Mainz) (Mainz, 1879)
- "Pastoral letters from Wilhelm Emmanuel Baron von Ketteler, Bishop of Mainz" (Hirtenbriefe von Wilhelm Emmanuel Freiherrn von Ketteler, Bischof von Mainz) (Mainz, 1904)
- Novalis' "Correspondence with Schlegel" (Briefwechsel mit Schlegel) (Mainz, 1880)
- "Correspondence of Dorothes von Schlegel (born Brendel Mendelssohn) with her sons Johannes and Phillip Viet" (Dorothes von Schlegel geb. Mendelssohn und deren Söhne Johannes und Phillip Viet, Briefwechsel) (Mainz, 1881)
- J. B. Rady's "History of the Catholic Church in Hesse" (Geschichte der katholischen Kirche in Hessen) (Mainz, 1904)

After the death of Johann Baptist Heinrich and Christoph Moufang, Raich was editor of "Der Katholik" from 1891 to 1907. From 1887 he also revised the "Frankfurter zeitgemässen Broschüren".
