= Ohler =

Ohler, or Öhler, is a surname. Notable people with the surname include:

- Aloys Karl Ohler (1817–1889), German cleric
- Pete Ohler (1940–2021), Canadian football player and coach

Companies include:

- Kastner & Öhler, Austrian chain of department stores

== See also ==
- Öhler system
- Oehler
