= Oehlen =

Oehlen is a surname. Notable people with the surname include:

- Adolf Oehlen (1914–1972), German illustrator and caricaturist
- Albert Oehlen (born 1954), German painter
- Markus Oehlen (born 1956), German artist

== See also ==
- Oehler
