= Else Kröner-Fresenius Foundation =

Non-profit foundation

- Formation: 1983
- Founder: Else Kröner
- Type: Private foundation
- Purpose: Promotion of medical research and medical-humanitarian aid projects
- Location: Bad Homburg, Germany
- Board of directors: Dieter Schenk (chair of the board); Karl Schneider (deputy chair); Winfried Baranowski (board); Andreas Berninger (board); Rudolf Herfurth (board); Susanne Schultz-Hector (board)
- Budget: EUR 6.2 billion (2014)
- Website: https://www.ekfs.de

The Else Kröner-Fresenius Foundation (EKFS; German: Else Kröner-Fresenius-Stiftung), founded in 1983, is a non-profit foundation dedicated to the support of medical research and medical-humanitarian development projects.

== History ==
Else Kröner (born in Fernau, 1925–1988) took over the Fresenius Company in 1946 after the death of her mentor and foster father Eduard Fresenius. Kröner led the company until her death in 1988, first as managing director and from 1982 as chair of the board.

To provide continuity in the event of her death and to cultivate the memory of Eduard Fresenius, Kröner founded the Else Kröner-Fresenius-Foundation on 7 April 1983. Initially the foundation was provided with a capital stock of 50,000 deutschmarks. Kröner decreed that in the event of her death all her personal assets should be transferred to the foundation.

On 5 June 1988, Kröner died unexpectedly, at age 63.

== Purpose ==
In her will, Kröner laid out the foundation's purpose:

The Foundation aims to promote medical science, giving priority to the areas of research and the treatment of diseases, including the development of equipment and preparations, such as artificial kidneys. The foundation may support only those research projects whose results are accessible to the general public. The foundation also aims to promote the training of medical professionals, primarily in the field of dialysis, and the promotion of education of especially talented students.

== Activities ==
The main focus of the Else Kröner-Fresenius Foundation is financing clinically-oriented biomedical research. Research proposals from all fields of medicine are considered. As of 2016, roughly 1300 projects have been funded, totaling over 200 million euros. It is one of the largest private foundations in Germany.

=== Else Kröner Memorial scholarships ===
In 2002, the foundation awarded the first of two scholarships. Due to high demand and the high quality of applications since 2007, the foundation has awarded five scholarships every year.

=== Science awards ===
The foundation grants or supports various scientific prizes, including the Else Kröner-Fresenius Immunology Award and the Else Kröner Memorial Award of the German Interdisciplinary Association for Intensive and Emergency Medicine.

The winner of the first Else Kröner-Fresenius Award in Immunology was Ruslan Medzhitov, in 2013. This prize is handed out every four years and is worth 4 million euros, 500,000 of which goes directly to the researcher, with the remainder being project-directed.

In 2023, the foundation awarded a 2.5 million euro prize to immunologist Akiko Iwasaki for work on post-acute viral syndromes like Long COVID and ME/CFS.

=== Educational initiatives ===
The Else Kröner-Fresenius Centre for Nutritional Medicine was founded in 2003 at the Technical University of Munich.

The Graduate School for "Translational Research Innovation – Pharma" (TRIP) was founded by the EKFS at the Goethe-University Frankfurt in 2012.

== See also ==
- List of wealthiest charitable foundations
