= Peter Kaiser (disambiguation) =

Peter Kaiser (born 1958) is governor of Carinthia.

Peter Kaiser may also refer to:

- Peter Kaiser (historian) (1793–1864), statesman and historian from Liechtenstein
- Peter Kaiser (musher) (born 1987), American dog musher of Yup'ik ancestry
- Petrus Leopold Kaiser (1788–1848), also called Peter, bishop of Mainz
- Peter Kaiser, artist and member of the Merioola Group
- Peter Kaiser, civil partner of New Zealand's first openly gay member of parliament, Chris Carter
