= Calea =

CALEA may refer to:

- Communications Assistance for Law Enforcement Act, an act by the US Congress to facilitate wiretapping of U.S. domestic telephone and Internet traffic
- Commission on Accreditation for Law Enforcement Agencies, a private accrediting organization for U.S. law enforcement agencies

Calea may refer to:

- Calea (plant), a genus of plants in the family Asteraceae
- Calea UK Ltd, a supplier of Parenteral nutrition
