= Massow (disambiguation) =

Massow is a municipality in Germany.

Massow may also refer to:

- Maszewo, a town in Poland known in German as Massow
- Ivan Massow (born 1967), British entrepreneur and media personality
- Julie von Massow (1825–1901), Prussian religious activist
