= Friedrich Lennig =

German poet (1796–1838)

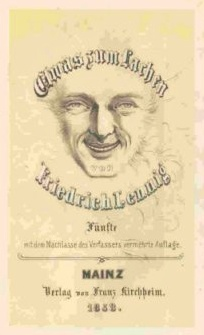
Title page from Etwas zum Lachen (Something to Laugh About, 1838), with a portrait sketch of the author

Johann Friedrich Lennig, also known as Fritz Lennig (3 November 1796, Mainz - 6 April 1838, Mainz) was a German poet, who wrote in the Hessian dialects.

== Life and work ==
His father was a prosperous merchant. He attended the Rabanus-Maurus-Gymnasium and studied philosophy at the Mainz Seminary. After that, he went to St. Gallen, where he learned the process of making canvases for painting, which was one of his father's principal stocks-in-trade. This proved to be an unsatisfying activity, one for which he was, perhaps, overeducated, so he returned to Mainz in 1818. There, he devoted himself to literary pursuits, which included producing a German translation of the Lay of the Last Minstrel, a long poem by Sir Walter Scott.

He initially wrote his poems in Standard German as well as in the Rhenish dialect. In his efforts to reproduce the dialect in detail, he made numerous visits to the rural areas surrounding Mainz, and took meticulous notes when he heard farmers selling their wares at the market near his home. In addition to his poems, he wrote works in the popular "Posse mit Gesang" (Farce with Singing) genre.

His works depict ordinary people, held up to a satirical mirror. Most represent a type known as the "Palatinate Farmer". His first published work came in 1824 with Etwas zum Lachen (Something to Laugh About), which was first sold anonymously at a local bookstore in Mainz. Later editions carried his name.

In January 1838, he became one of the founders of the Mainzer Carneval-Verein. He died later that year, at the age of forty-one, from typhus.

His parents' home, where he was born, is still known as the "Lennighaus". A street has also been named after him. His younger brother, Adam Franz Lennig, was a Catholic theologian and served as a Dean.

== Selected works ==
- Etwas zum Lachen (Something to Laugh About), illustrated by Edmund Harburger. 11th edition, Kirchheim, 1938. (Online)
- Die Weinproben (A Sampling) (1836, Online)

== Sources ==
- Friedrich Goedecker: Friedrich Lennig. Ein Mainzer Dialekt- und Volksdichter. Lecture given in Mainz, Joh. Falk & Söhne, 1903.
- Seppel Glückert: "Friedrich Lennig", in: Mainzer Kalender 1947, Stadtverwaltung Mainz, 1946
