= Edmund Harburger =

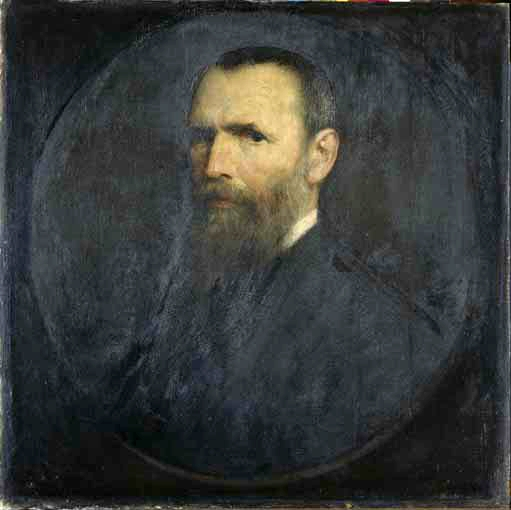
Edmund Harburger, self-portrait

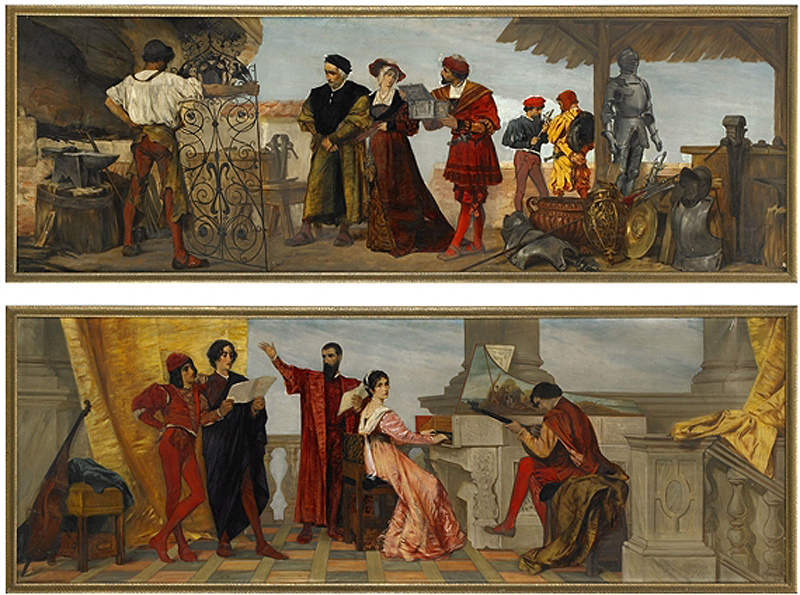
Blacksmithing and Music

Edmund Harburger (4 April 1846, Eichstätt – 5 November 1906, Munich) was a German painter and draftsman.

== Life ==
His father, Franz Xaver, was a merchant in Mainz, and his mother Elisabeth was the daughter of a flagstone dealer. As a result of this connection, Edmund was apprenticed as a mason; a profession he practiced until 1865. His employer's brother was the animal painter, Johann Erdmann Gottlieb Prestel (1804-1885), who inspired him to become an artist. He began by dabbling in small murals at the local casinos. After six years of apprenticeship, he attended the Polytechnic School in Munich (precursor of the University of Technology) to study the building trades but, in 1866, he decided to follow his true passion and switched to the Academy of Fine Arts Munich, where he studied under Karl Raupp and Wilhelm von Lindenschmit the Younger.

In addition to painting, he was also interested in illustrating and caricatures. In 1872 some of his first wood engravings appeared in a book by Friedrich Lennig, a dialect poet from Mainz. Later, he created political cartoons for Die Gartenlaube and, by the time of his death, had contributed over 1,500 humorous drawings to the Fliegende Blätter. Harburger was particularly attracted to the works of the 17th-century Dutch painters, such as David Teniers the Younger and Adriaen van Ostade). From 1876 to 1878, he lived in Venice, where he copied the masters.

In 1882, the firm of Braun & Schneider printed a large-format album, containing 60 of his works. Exhibitions were given at the Glaspalast, the Paris Salon (1882/84), the Academy of Arts, Berlin, and the Great Berlin Art Exhibition of 1905. He designed and built his own house in the Nymphenburger Straße.

Many of the major museums in Central and Northern Europe have displays of his drawings and engravings, including the Neue Pinakothek, the Landesmuseum Mainz, the Hessisches Landesmuseum Darmstadt and museums in Gdansk, Gothenburg, Leipzig, Münster, Prague and Zürich.

== Sources ==
- Edwart Mager: Edmund Harburger - ein aus Eichstätt stammender Künstler, in: Historische Blätter für Stadt und Landkreis Eichstätt, 28 (1979), Nr. 5
- Heimstätten münchener Künstler. (the houses of Matthias Schmidt, Edmund Harburger, Franz von Lenbach, Hans Theyer and Franz von Defregger), Holzstich nach Franz, 1890, 33x23 cm
- Dorothea Stern: Harburger, Edmund. In: Allgemeines Lexikon der bildenden Künste von der Antike bis zur Gegenwart. Researched by Ulrich Thieme und Felix Becker. Ed. by Hans Vollmer. Vol. 16, Leipzig (1923), S. 19f.
- Article in Deutsche Biographische Enzyklopädie (DBE), Vol. 4, Munich 1996, p. 380
- Adolf Wild: Karikaturen, die das Leben schrieb: Edmund Harburger, ein Mainzer Zeichner bei den Münchner "Fliegenden Blättern". In: Mainz. Vierteljahreshefte für Kultur, Politik, Wirtschaft, Geschichte. 21 (2001), 4, p. 99-103, ill.
