= Theodor Scherer-Boccard =

Swiss journalist and politician (1816–1885)

Theodor, Count von Scherer-Boccard (12 May 1816 at Dornach in the canton of Solothurn – 6 February 1885 at Solothurn) was a Swiss journalist and politician.

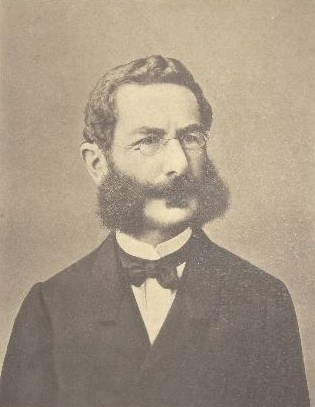
Theodor Scherer-Boccard, 1874

== Life ==
Scherer belonged to a distinguished family of Solothurn. He attended the gymnasium there, took the philosophical course at the lyceum, and then studied law at the Athenäum conducted by the Jesuits at Fribourg.

After this Scherer returned to Solothurn and devoted himself to journalism, founding the newspaper Die Schildwache am Jura (1836–41), in which he defended the Catholic Church and the rights of the people. In addition to this he established in 1839 a bureau of correspondence with conservative tendencies.

From 1838 Scherer was also a member of the great council of the canton. His political activity in this body brought him into conflict with the Government and obliged him in 1841 to live abroad for some time in Alsace and Paris. At the close of 1841 he was called to Lucerne where he founded and edited the Staatszeitung der katholischen Schweiz, which became the chief organ of the Catholic-Conservative party.

In 1843 Scherer returned to Solothurn and served out a term of imprisonment to which he had been condemned on account of the events of 1841. In 1845 he was made secretary to Magistrate Constantin Siegwart-Müller of Lucerne, who was the president of the Sonderbund. Scherer himself had a share also in the founding of the Sonderbund. After the Sonderbund War he returned to private life at Solothurn, where he devoted himself to labors on behalf of Catholic interests and of social subjects. He did much journalistic work, being a contributor to numerous Catholic journals of Switzerland and Germany. During a visit to Rome in 1852 he was made a Roman count by Pope Pius IX.

From 1855 Scherer lived in the small castle of Hünenberg in Ebikon near Lucerne. In 1868 he married Marie Louise von Boccard, and after that used the double name Scherer-Boccard. In 1844 Scherer founded the Academy of St. Charles Borromeo, an association of the Catholic scholars of Switzerland, and edited as the organ of the association a journal called "Katholische Annalen" (Lucerne, 1847); the war of the "Sonderbund" put an end to this periodical and to the academy also. In 1857 he was one of the founders of the Swiss Pius Association (Piusverein), and from the time the society was established until his death he was the president of the central organization; he was also the head of the Society for Home Missions, founded in 1863. He was in touch with the Catholics of Germany and spoke repeatedly at the German-Catholic congresses.

== Works ==
Scherer-Boccard issued 35 separate publications, containing apologetic, biographical, or historical matter. They included:

- "Revolution und Restauration der Staatswissenschaft" (Augsburg and Lucerne, 1842, 2nd ed., 1845);
- "Die fünfzehnjahrige Fehde der Revolution gegen die katholische Schweiz 1830-45" (Lucerne, 1846);
- "Das Verhältniss zwischen Kirche und Staat" (Ratisbon, 1846, 2nd ed., 1854);
- "Die Reformbewegung unserer Zeit und das Christenthum" (Augsburg, 1848);
- "Der heilige Vater. Betrachtungen über die Mission und die Verdienste des Papstthums" (Munich, 1850), French tr., "Le Saint-Père. Considérations sur la mission et les mérites de la Papauté" (Paris, 1853);
- "Heidenthum und Christenthum betrachtet in den Monumenten des alten und neuen Roms" (Schaffhausen, 1853, 2nd ed., 1880)
- "Lebensbilder aus der Gesellschaft Jesu. Ein Beitrag zur Geschichte der katholischen Restauration" (Schaffhausen, 1854).

He was also one of the editors of the "Archiv für schweizerische Reformationsgeschichte" (3 vols., Fribourg, 1869–75).
