= Heinrich Leo =

Prussian historian and politician (1799–1878)

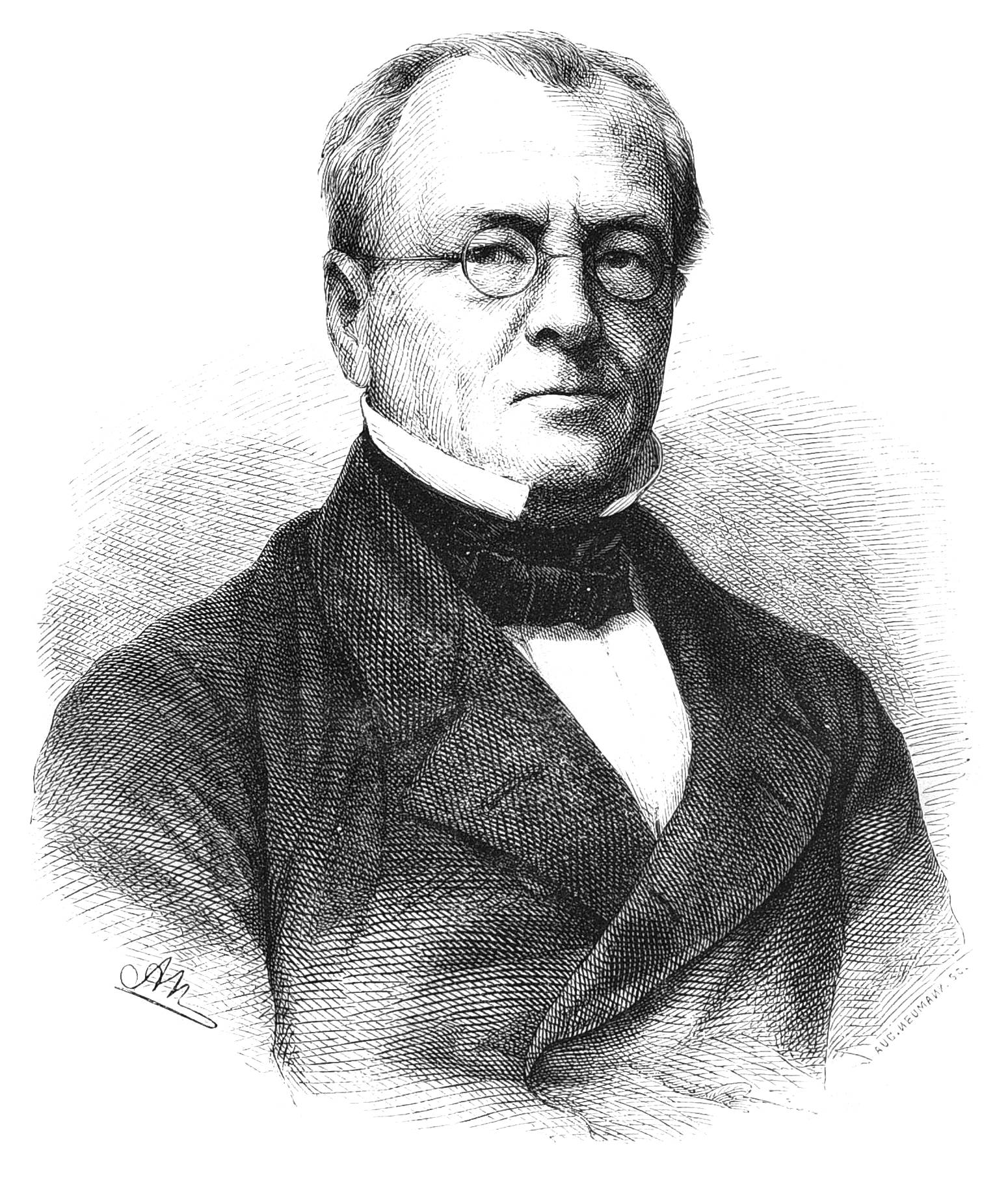
Heinrich Leo

Heinrich Leo (17 March 1799 – 24 April 1878) was a Prussian historian born in Rudolstadt, where his father was garrison chaplain.

His family was not of Italian origin, as he himself was inclined to believe on the strength of family tradition, but established in Lower Saxony as early as the 10th century. The taste for historical study was early instilled into him by the eminent philologist Karl Wilhelm Göttling (1793 - 1869), who in 1816 became a master at the Rudolstadt gymnasium.

From 1816 to 1819 Leo studied at the universities of Breslau, Jena and Göttingen, devoting himself to history, philology and theology. At this time the universities were still agitated by the Liberal and patriotic aspirations aroused by the War of Liberation; at Breslau Leo fell under the influence of Jahn, and joined the political gymnastic association (Turnverein); at Jena he attached himself to the radical wing of the students association, the so-called Black Band, under the leadership of Karl Follen. The murder of August von Kotzebue by Karl Sand, however, shocked him out of his revolutionary views, and from this time he tended, under the influence of the writings of Hamann and Herder, more and more in the direction of conservatism and romanticism. He ended, in a mood almost of pessimism, by attaching himself to the extreme right wing of the forces of reaction.

So early as April 1819, at Göttingen, he had fallen under the influence of Karl Ludwig von Haller's Handbuch der allgemeinen Staatenkunde (1808), a textbook of the counter-revolution. On 11 May 1820 he took his doctor's degree; in the same year he qualified as Privatdozent at the University of Erlangen. For this latter purpose he had chosen as his thesis the constitution of the free Lombard Cities in the Middle Ages, the province in which he was destined to do most for the scientific study of history. His interest in it was greatly stimulated by a journey to Italy in 1823; In 1824 he returned to the subject, and, as the result, published in five volumes a history of the Italian states (1829-1832). Meanwhile, he had been established (1822-1827) as Dozent in Berlin, where he came in contact with leaders of German thought and was somewhat spoiled by the attentions of society. Here, too, it was that Hegel's philosophy of history made a deep impression upon him. It was at Halle, however, where he remained for forty years, that he acquired his fame as an academical teacher.

In addition to his lecturing, Leo found time for much literary and political work. As a critic of independent views he won the approval of Goethe; on the other hand, he fell into violent controversy with Ranke about questions connected with Italian history. Up to the revolutionary year 1830 his religious views had remained strongly tinged with rationalism, Hegel remaining his guide in religion as in practical politics and the treatment of history.

It was not until 1838 that Leo's polemical work Die Hegelingen proclaimed his breach with the radical developments of the philosopher's later disciples; a breach which developed into opposition to the philosopher himself. Under the impression of the July revolution in Paris and of the orthodox and pietistic influences at Halle, Leo's political convictions were henceforth dominated by reactionary principles.

As a friend of the Prussian Camarilla and of King Frederick William IV of Prussia, he collaborated especially in the high conservative Politisches Wochenblatt, which first appeared in 1831, as well as in the Evangelische Kirchenzeitung, the Kreuzzeitung and the Volksblatt für Stadt und Land. In all this his critics scented an inclination towards Catholicism; and Leo did actually glorify the counter-Reformation, e.g. in his History of the Netherlands (2 vols. 1832-1835). His other historical works also, notably his Universal Geschichte (6 vols., 1835-1844), display a very onesided point of view. When, however, in connection with the quarrel about the archbishopric of Cologne (1837), political Catholicism raised its head, Leo turned against it with extreme violence in his open letter (1838) to Goerres, its foremost champion. On the other hand, he took a lively part in the politico-religious controversies within the fold of Prussian Protestantism. Later in life he became much less extreme in his religious and political views and participated in the Ut Omnes Unum movement started by Julie von Massow, which aimed at the unification of Protestantism and Catholicism.

During the last year of his life his mind suffered rapid decay, of which signs had been apparent so early as 1868. He died at Halle on 24 April 1878. In addition to the works already mentioned, he left behind an account of his early life; Meine Jugendzeit.

== See also ==
- Right Hegelians
