= Ruslan Medzhitov =

American immunologist

- Born: March 12, 1966 (age 60); Tashkent, Uzbek SSR, Soviet Union (now Tashkent, Uzbekistan)
- Citizenship: American
- Education: Tashkent State University; Moscow State University
- Spouse: Akiko Iwasaki (m. 2007)
- Children: 2
- Awards: Shaw Prize (2011)
- Scientific career
- Fields: Immunology
- Workplaces: Yale University

Ruslan Maksutovich Medzhitov (Uzbek: Руслан Мақсутович Меджитов, romanized: Ruslan Maqsutovich Medjitov; born March 12, 1966) is a professor of immunobiology and dermatology at the Yale School of Medicine, and an investigator at the Howard Hughes Medical Institute. His research focuses on the analysis of the innate immune system, inflammatory response, innate control of the adaptive immunity, and host-pathogen interactions. In 2010, he was elected to the National Academy of Sciences, and in 2017 he was named Sterling Professor.

== Biography ==
Ruslan Medzhitov was born in 1966 in Tashkent. He earned a Bachelor of Science at Tashkent State University before going on to pursue a PhD in biochemistry at Moscow State University. In 1992, he read an article by Charles Janeway about a hypothetical flip-flop triggered innate immunity.

Before coming to Yale, he was a fellow in the laboratory of Russell Doolittle at the University of California, San Diego. He did his post-doctoral training with Janeway at Yale University School of Medicine from 1994 to 1999.

In 1997, Medzhitov and Janeway proved that humans have a Toll-like receptor (later named TLR4), which activates genes necessary for the immune response. In 2000, Medzhitov was selected as a Searle Scholar. On April 27, 2010, he was elected to the US National Academy of Sciences and became one of the youngest academicians. In 2011, the Russian edition of Forbes published a list of 50 Russians who “conquered the world”. It includes scientists, businessmen, and cultural and sports figures who have integrated into the world community and achieved success outside Russia. Medzhitov was included in this Forbes list of 10 famous scientists of Russian origin.

On May 15, 2012, Medzhitov was awarded a diploma and a medal of the Honorary Professor at Moscow State University. Currently, he serves as a Sterling Professor at the Yale University School of Medicine.

== Awards ==
He has received the William Coley Award for Distinguished Research in Basic and Tumor Immunology from the Cancer Research Institute, a Master of Arts Privatum at Yale University, the Emil von Behring Award, AAI-BD Biosciences Investigator Award, a doctorate honoris Causa at LMU Munich, the Blavatnik Award for Young Scientists from the New York Academy of Arts and Sciences, the Howard Taylor Ricketts Award from the University of Chicago, the Lewis S. Rosenstiel Award for Distinguished Work in Basic Medical Research in 2010, and the Dickson Prize in 2019.

In recognition of his prolific contributions to the field of immunological research, he was elected to the National Academy of Sciences and in 2011 he was a co-recipient of the Shaw Prize in Life Science and Medicine. In 2013, Medzhitov received the Vilcek Prize in Biomedical Science.

== Personal life ==
In 2007, Medzhitov married Akiko Iwasaki, a professor in the Department of Molecular, Cellular, and Developmental Biology at Yale University. They have two daughters.
