= Windischmann =

Windischmann is a German surname. Notable people with the surname include:

- Karl Joseph Hieronymus Windischmann (1775–1839), German doctor, philosopher, and anthropologist
- Liis Windischmann, Canadian model
- Mike Windischmann (born 1965), American soccer player
