= Aloys Karl Ohler =

German Catholic cleric and educationist

Aloys Karl Ohler was a German Catholic cleric and educationist.

== Biography ==
He was born at Mainz on 2 January 1817. He attended the gymnasium at Mainz, studied theology at Gießen, and was ordained a Roman Catholic priest at Mainz on 14 August 1839. His first charge was that of chaplain at Seligenstadt. Like his colleague, Christoph Moufang, he was one of the founders and teachers of the Progymnasium of that city. He became spiritual director of St. Rochus Hospital at Mainz in 1845, and pastor at Abenheim near Worms in 1847.

On 21 June 1852, he was appointed director of the Hessian Catholic teachers' training college at Bensheim. During the fifteen years of his administration, encouraged by Bishop von Ketteler, Ohler laboured to infuse a better spirit into the Catholic teaching body of Hesse. On 8 April 1867, he was made a canon of the cathedral chapter of Mainz Cathedral, given charge of educational matters, and appointed lecturer in pedagogy and catechetics at the episcopal seminary - a position he held until the seminary was closed during the Kulturkampf in 1878. He died in Mainz on 24 August 1889.

== Writings ==
Ohler's chief work is "Lehrbuch der Erziehung und des Unterrichtes" (Mainz, 1861; 10th ed., 1884). The fundamental idea of the work is that the education of Catholic youth should be conducted on Catholic principles, Church and school co-operating harmoniously to this end. The work was intended for the use of the clergy as well as for teachers.

Ohler adapted from the Italian: "Cajetanus maria von Bergamo, Ermahnungen im Beichtstuhle" (5th ed., Mainz, 1886), "Johannes Baptista Lambruschini, Der geistliche Führer" (Mainz, 1848; 12th ed., 1872), and an abridged edition of the latter, "Der kleine geistliche Führer" (1851; 6th ed., 1861).
