= Oehlers =

Oehlers is a surname. Notable people with the surname include:

- Aurelio Oehlers (born 2004), Dutch footballer
- Dwight Oehlers (born 1988), Aruban footballer
- George Oehlers (1908–1968), Singaporean politician and lawyer
- Jamie Oehlers, Australian jazz saxophonist
- Leroy Oehlers (born 1992), Aruban footballer
- Thora Oehlers (1913–1990), Singaporean physician

== See also ==
- Oehler, surname
