= Ihr Christen, singet hocherfreut =

Christian hymn

- Easter hymn
- English: You Christians, sing in great joy
- Written: 1865
- Text: by Christoph Moufang
- Language: German
- Based on: "O filii et filiae"

"Ihr Christen, singet hocherfreut" (You Christians, sing in great joy) is a Christian Easter hymn. The German text was adapted by Christoph Moufang in 1865 from the 15th-century Latin hymn "O filii et filiae". It is sung to the same melody. Beginning and ending with a three-fold Halleluja, it is also known as "Halleluja – Ihr Christen, singet hocherfreut". The Latin "O filii" was translated into English by John Mason Neale as "Ye Sons and Daughters of the King" and appears in many English language hymnals.

== Background and history ==
"Ihr Christen, singet hocherfreut" is a German adaptation of the Latin hymn for Easter "O filii et filiae" that Jean Tisserand created before 1494. The melody appeared in Paris in 1623. It begins with a Halleluja, which is then used as a refrain. The song became popular in France.

The song was adapted by Christoph Moufang in 1865. The song became part of the Catholic hymnal Gotteslob in 1975 as GL 221, and was retained in the 2013 edition as GL 322.

== Theme and text ==
The hymn begins with a repeated Halleluja, which serves as refrain for the following twelve stanzas, each in three rhyming lines and again closed by Halleluja. They tell events from the Easter narrations. For example in the second stanza, that the women want to anoint the body of Jesus, but do not know how to remove the rock closing the grave. The third and fourth stanzas refer to disciples Peter and John running to the grave. The fifth stanza is a narrative of an angel addressing the women. The sixths stanza quotes the angel saying "Bleibt nicht beim leeren Grabe stehn, ihr sollt nach Galiläa gehn, dort werdet ihr den Meister sehn." (Don't remain standing at the empty tomb, you shall go to Galilee, there you will see the Master.)

The following stanzas, seven to eleven, refer to appearances of Jesus to the disciples hiding in a locked room in Jerusalem, first without Thomas, than also to him. The final stanza is a call to praise God on the day he has made.

== Melody and music ==
The melody is in a triple metre. The three-fold Halleluja of the refrain begins and ends on the tonic, moving mostly in even-quarter notes. The first and second lines have the same melody, and the third line takes its melody from the refrain.

Edited by Mailänder, Carus-Verlag published in 2014 a collection of chorale preludes for Gotteslob hymns for Lent and Easter, Choralvorspiele für Orgel zum Gotteslob / Band 2 · Österliche Bußzeit und Ostern, with two preludes for the Halleluja, one by Richard Lloyd and one by Colin Mawby. In 2016, W. Merkes composed a three-part choral arrangement for use in the Diocese of Trier during the Easter Vigil. He set the first six stanzas in one version for the uneven stanzas and another for the even ones, both for soprano, alto and men's voices.
