= Oehler =

Oehler is a surname. Notable people with the surname include:

- Edgar Oehler (1942–2025), Swiss businessman and politician
- Hans Oehler (1888–1967), Swiss journalist
- Hugo Oehler (1903–1983), American communist
- Mike Oehler (1938–2016), American author
- Richard Oehler (1878–1948), German Nietzsche scholar

== See also ==
- Oehlers, surname
- Oehler system
- Ohler, surname
