= Calea UK =

English supplier of intravenous nutrition

Calea UK is a supplier of parenteral nutrition based in Runcorn, England, part of Fresenius Kabi.

== History ==
In July 2019 the Medicines and Healthcare products Regulatory Agency imposed restrictions on the company following an inspection which it said revealed contamination risks and production processes that did not meet required standards.

The resulting disruption of supplies to patients who rely on total parenteral nutrition was declared a national emergency by NHS England. Intravenous feed bags were imported from Norway and Germany for 511 patients. Dozens of patients were admitted to hospital as a result.

The regulator's actions were denounced by members of the British Association for Parenteral and Enteral Nutrition, who said that no forward planning or mitigation plan had been prepared should they be closed.

Calea said the MHRA directed "an immediate change to the process by which we add trace elements and vitamins to our parenteral nutrition bags, and we complied with the instruction. As a result, the time taken to produce bags has increased considerably and this has, unfortunately, affected the supply to patients. The MHRA stated there was no evidence to indicate that any of the Calea products manufactured and supplied to patients were contaminated. Approximately 2.8 million products were aseptically manufactured by Calea for patients and hospitals in the intervening 2015-2019 period."

The agency said they had found bacterial contamination in the production area and that the manufacturing processes in Runcorn did not meet guidelines.

Patients complained that they were left starving when supplies did not arrive, and that they were given no information. About 130 patients were affected in Wales. The substituted supplies made some ill. About 2500 patients receive intravenous nutrition and fluids in the UK at any one time. The industrial capacity is limited. The action of the agency was widely condemned by clinicians.
