= Liis Windischmann =

Canadian plus-size model

Liis Windischmann is a Canadian plus-size model based in Toronto, Ontario.

== Early years ==
Windischmann first modeled at the age of 16. She was told to lose weight, which she decided against. Four years later she was spotted by a talent scout in a mall and began to work as a plus-size model.

== Career ==
Windischmann has worked with brands including Addition Elle, Reitman's and Laura. In 2006, she hosted a half-hour TV show for Canadian Learning Television on modelling. In 2007 she created the Fenomenal Calendar of plus size women and she created the Walk the Catwalk event where she encouraged the use of more sample sizes. She was the director of Ben Barry Agency. She is also the Fashion Insider for LouLou Magazine's 14+.

In 2011, Windischmann was diagnosed with Hashimoto's thyroiditis. As a result of her illness, she lost nearly 50 pounds.
