= Maria Einsmann =

German woman who lived as a man for 12 years to obtain better jobs

Maria Einsmann (née Mayer, 4 January 1885 – 4 March 1959) was a German factory worker who lived using the name of her husband Joseph Einsmann (nicknamed "Seppel", also spelled Josef) from 1919 until her identity was discovered in 1931. She and her friend Helene Müller lived together from 1919 until Einsmann died in 1959. As Joseph, Einsmann found it easier to find work and had several jobs, including as a watchman and in a shoe polish factory. The deception was discovered when Einsmann had a work accident and the social security office investigated why there were two identical Joseph Einsmanns. At the subsequent trial, Einsmann and Müller were accused of fraud and falsification as Einsmann had declared to be the father of Müller's children and given a suspended sentence. The case was widely reported on in the press, with many articles expressing understanding and sympathy for the women. It was also adapted in literature by Anna Seghers and by Bertolt Brecht.

== Early life ==
Maria Einsmann was born Maria Mayer on 4 January 1885 in Bruchsal in the Grand Duchy of Baden, the eldest of three children of Anna (née Weinschenk) and the factory worker Friedrich Mayer. Her brother Karl died shortly after birth in 1890, and her younger sister Anna Barbara was born in 1892. Little is recorded about Mayer's childhood or education, which was typical for working-class women of the period, whose lives often entered the historical record only through employment, marriage, or legal documents. As a young woman she worked as a laundry ironer, a form of wage labour common among women in the service and garment trades. In May 1912, at the age of 27, she married the plasterer Joseph Einsmann in Karlsruhe. Their marriage was unhappy, and the couple separated during World War I while her husband was in the military. The marriage was formally dissolved by divorce in 1923; Einsmann later stated that she only learned of the divorce in 1930.

By 1916 Mayer was working in a munitions factory in Pforzheim, one of many women employed in industrial work during the war as male labourers were drafted into military service. The expansion of such work temporarily broadened employment opportunities for women, though these largely disappeared again after the war. It was in Pforzheim that she met Helene Müller, who later became her life partner. Müller, born Helene Hertha Banz on 6 December 1894 in Pforzheim, had married the goldsmith Emil Müller in 1914, but the marriage soon proved unhappy and the couple separated during the war. Müller's marriage was formally dissolved in absentia in Karlsruhe in 1922.

== Life as a man ==
In 1919, Einsmann and Müller came via Wiesbaden to Mainz in an attempt to find work, but most positions were given to men returning from the war. Women were explicitly asked to leave their work for returning men. In desperation, Einsmann put on one of her husband's suits that she had taken from their joint household, had her hair cut and went to the Arbeitsamt, the German public employment service. The suit pockets contained a social security card for Josef Einsmann, and she obtained employment in his name, first working at a French army vehicle depot. Einsmann and Müller moved into a bedsit together, later sharing a flat. Müller also obtained employment as a maid. In the following years, Einsmann continued to live and work under the identity of Josef, changing employment several times including work as a watchman, doing earthworks, her original profession of ironer, until finally working in the Erdal shoe polish factory of Werner & Mertz for several years. Einsmann, who was called "Seppel" by colleagues and reportedly used snuff, was active in a trade union and sang in a Catholic church choir. When Müller gave birth to a girl in 1921, Einsmann had the baby registered as legitimate child of Josef and Maria Einsmann. A second child was born in 1930; when Einsmann tried to register the baby in the same way as the first, the registry office noticed that Josef and Maria Einsmann were divorced. Einsmann then claimed to have fathered the child illegitimately with ex-wife Maria Mayer, under whose maiden name the child was then registered. The tax office was also notified of the births to reduce the tax load of Einsmann, who bought life insurance benefitting the children.

== Discovery and trial ==
Family photograph of Einsmann and Müller with the two daughters

In 1931, Einsmann had an accident at work that resulted in a crushed finger. Einsmann's fake identity was not discovered during the hospital stay on a men's ward. However, upon receiving the subsequent claim for temporary incapacity insurance for Josef Einsmann, the central social insurance office at the Reichsversicherungsamt noticed that there were two social security cards with identical details for "Josef Einsmann" in use and investigated the case. Upon questioning, Einsmann immediately confessed that she was a woman named Maria. The discovery of a woman who had lived undetected as a man for twelve years caused a press sensation from August 1931 and the story was widely covered in both German and foreign newspapers, for example in France, the Netherlands, Estonia and the US. Many of the reports expressed respect and understanding for Einsmann, who was considered to have worked hard to feed her family and to have only resorted to deception in an emergency situation.

The two women were charged with falsifying documents and fraudulent change of the children's civil status. In the time leading up to their trial, Einsmann sold photographs showing the family including the two women as a couple and also spoke at events in the local area. The expert opinion of two psychologists was sought. One was Felix Abraham from the Berlin Institut für Sexualwissenschaft (headed by Magnus Hirschfeld), the other the county medical officer Dr Wagner. At the trial on 20 August 1932, Einsmann appeared in women's clothing and denied having a sexual relationship with Müller. Einsmann's former husband was called as a witness but refused to testify. There was a large difference between the expert reports: Dr Abraham claimed Einsmann had transvestism that compelled her to cross-dress and that she was not in control of her actions, while Dr Wagner declared the deception had happened motivated only by economic reasons to avert an emergency and that Einsmann was fully responsible for her actions. The court followed Wagner's opinion. Both Einsmann and Müller were found guilty after a three-hour trial, but the sentences were lenient: Einsmann was sentenced to one month and Müller to four weeks of prison, with both sentences suspended. The prosecution had asked for two months for Einsmann and a month and a week for Müller, while the defence had called for an acquittal. The court explained the leniency by its respect for the two women's bravery in dealing with their life and similar sentiments were expressed in the press coverage. Einsmann and Müller accepted the sentence.

== Later life ==
Einsmann, now living as a woman and wearing women's clothes, continued to live with Müller in the same flat as before, with the two moving to a different flat in Mainz in 1945. She also kept her position at Erdal. Einsmann died in Mainz on 4 March 1959. The death announcement in the name of Helene Müller, her daughters and their families referred to her as "our dear aunt Mrs Maria Einsmann". According to her granddaughter Petra Erkens, Müller rarely spoke about Einsmann's time as a man and never revealed the identity of her children's father. Erkens did not know whether Einsmann and Müller had a sexual relationship; according to her there was never another "aunt" in Müller's life. Müller died in Mainz on 7 November 1993, aged 98.

== Reception and legacy ==
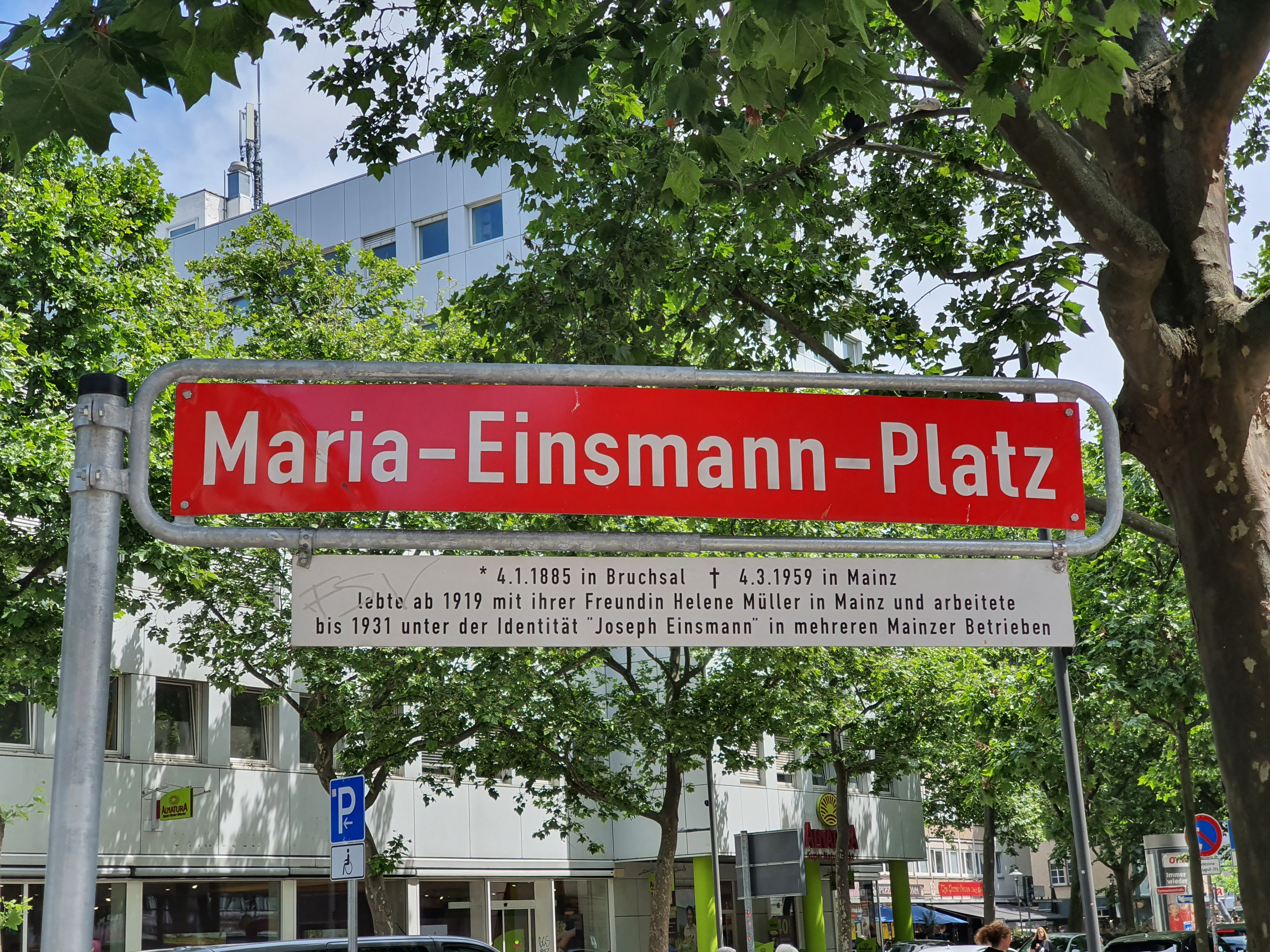
Street sign for Maria-Einsmann-Platz in Mainz

The story of how Einsmann was living as a man was used as literary inspiration. The Mainz-born author Anna Seghers used it as the basis of her 1940 story Der sogenannte Rendel ('The so-called Rendel'). She also wrote a film script based on the story, Hier gibt's keine Katharina ('There is no Katharina here'), but the project was never realised. The filmmaker Barbara Trottnow, also from Mainz, came across the story and Seghers' script in 1989. After researching the connections with Einsmann and parallels to the life of Seghers, Trottnow made a film based on parts of the script, Katharina oder: Die Kunst, Arbeit zu finden ('Katharina or: the art of finding work'). The film, shot in Mainz and the surrounding area, was finished in 1995 and broadcast by the ZDF in 1996. The film is a docufiction that combines the story of Anna Seghers' life in exile, that of a Thuringian real single mother and the life of Maria Einsmann during the Great Depression with Seghers' fictional Katharina story. In 2021, Trottnow also released a documentary about Einsmann, Frau Vater ('Madam Father') that included Müller's granddaughter Erkens.

Another contemporary literary adaptation is Bertolt Brecht's story Der Arbeitsplatz oder Im Schweiße Deines Angesichts sollst Du kein Brot essen ('The Workplace or By the Sweat of Your Brow You Shall Eat No Bread'). It is possible that Brecht was inspired by Seghers and that they discussed the Einsmann case in April 1933 while exiled to Paris. A variant version of the story was written by Brecht's collaborator Elisabeth Hauptmann but has been lost.

In modern reception, Einsmann is sometimes discussed as a trans man. The scholar of gender studies Katie Sutton reads Paul Weber's 1932 article in the lesbian magazine Die Freundin as the description of a "successful transgender man who has done his duty by his beloved wife and their children".

In 2014, the Mainz-Altstadt district decided to commemorate Einsmann by naming a square in the city after her. After a suitable space had been created, the Mainz city assembly voted in 2019 to name it Maria-Einsmann-Platz ('Maria Einsmann square'). The new square is not used as a postal address. Petra Erkens commented on the choice to name the square only after Einsmann, noting that "Joseph Einsmann" could not have existed without Helene Müller.

== Sources ==
- "Maria Einsmann, eine tapfere Frau!". Mainzer Volkzeitung (in German). 22 August 1932. Reprinted in Stephan (1993, pp. 117–122) and Weickart (2020, p. 15).
- "'Frau Vater. Die Geschichte der Maria Einsmann' – Der neue Dokumentarfilm von Barbara Trottnow – Haus des Erinnerns" (in German). 10 March 2021.
- Elsner, Ursula (2020). "Traditionsbezüge, literarische Wahlverwandtschaften, intertextuelle Beziehungen". In Hilmes, Carola; Nagelschmidt, Ilsa (eds.). Anna Seghers-Handbuch: Leben - Werk - Wirkung (in German). Stuttgart: J.B. Metzler. pp. 291–298. doi:10.1007/978-3-476-05665-8_45. ISBN 978-3-476-05665-8.
- Grau, Günter; Plötz, Kirsten (2016). "Aufarbeitung der strafrechtlichen Verfolgung und Rehabilitierung homosexueller Menschen". Landesregierung Rheinland-Pfalz (in German). Archived from the original on 22 December 2024.
- Jürgs, Alexander (12 September 2021). "Maria ist Joseph". Frankfurter Allgemeine Sonntagszeitung (in German). p. R1. ISSN 1611-3993. ProQuest 2571650604.
- Kebir, Sabine (1997). Ich fragte nicht nach meinem Anteil : Elisabeth Hauptmanns Arbeit mit Bertolt Brecht (in German). Berlin: Aufbau-Verlag. ISBN 978-3-7466-8058-3.
- Mews, Siegfried (2002). "Der Arbeitsplatz oder Im Schweiße Deines Angesichts sollst Du kein Brot essen". Brecht Handbuch: Band 3: Prosa, Filme, Drehbücher (in German). Stuttgart: J.B. Metzler. pp. 220–227. doi:10.1007/978-3-476-05610-8_4.
- Ohl, Hans-Willi (2020). "Verfilmungen". In Hilmes, Carola; Nagelschmidt, Ilsa (eds.). Anna Seghers-Handbuch: Leben - Werk - Wirkung (in German). Stuttgart: J.B. Metzler. pp. 371–380. doi:10.1007/978-3-476-05665-8_55. ISBN 978-3-476-05665-8.
- P. (1931). "Josef Maria Einsmann". Die Freundin (in German). No. 35. pp. 2–3.
- Schenk, Andreas (18 September 2023). "Transidente Menschen in der queeren Geschichte der Rhein-Neckar-Region". MARCHIVUM (in German). Archived from the original on 9 December 2024.
- Stephan, Alexander (1993). Anna Seghers im Exil : Essays, Texte, Dokumente (in German). Bonn: Bouvier. ISBN 978-3-416-02333-7.
- Sutton, Katie (1 April 2011). The Masculine Woman in Weimar Germany. Berghahn Books. doi:10.1515/9780857451217. ISBN 978-0-85745-121-7.
- Weber, Paul (1932). "Das Urteil gegen Frau Einsmann". Die Freundin (in German). No. 36. p. 2.
- Weickart, Eva (2020). "Die Frau in Männerkleidung. Der Fall Maria Einsmann. Presseberichte aus den Jahren 1931 und 1932". www.mainz.de (in German).
