= Alfonso Sancha =

Spanish executive

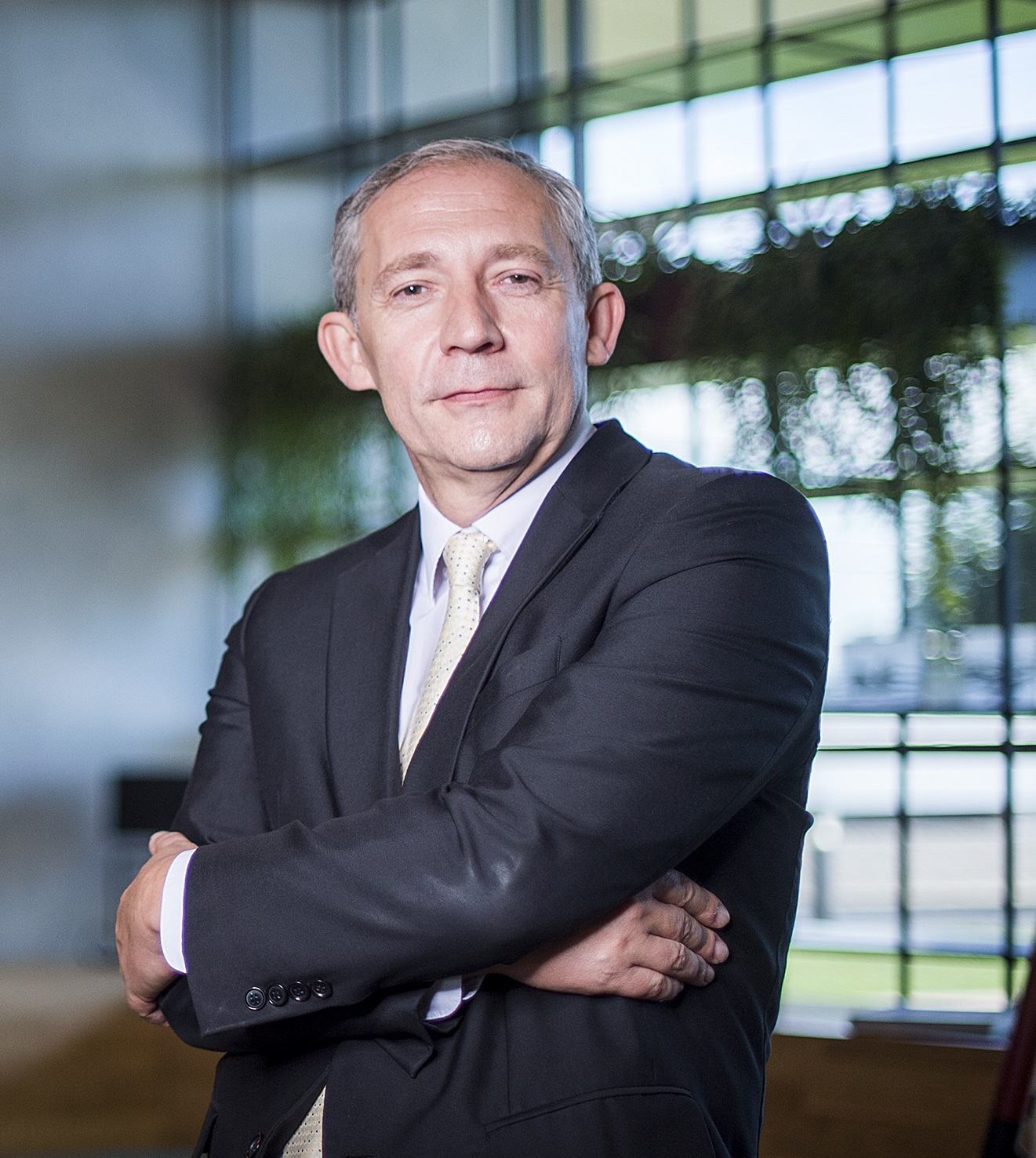
- Born: Mainz, Germany
- Baptised: 1965
- Occupation: Executive vice-president for purchasing
- Organization: SEAT

Alfonso Sancha (Mainz, Germany, 1965) is a Spanish executive. Sancha has developed a long career within the Volkswagen Group, where he began his professional career in 1997 and has performed several responsibilities. Since 2019 he is SEAT's executive vice-president for purchasing and a member of its executive committee.

== Career ==
The son of Spanish parents who emigrated to Germany in the 1950s, Alfonso Sancha has a bachelor's degree in international business from the Darmstadt Chamber of Commerce. He has developed his career in the automotive industry, mainly in the Volkswagen Group, holding positions of international relevance in Germany, Mexico and China.

He was the purchasing manager for metal parts for the entire Volkswagen Group, until he assumed his position as vice president of purchasing at SEAT in 2019. Between 2011 and 2014 he was executive vice-president for purchasing at Volkswagen Group China. Previously, he had performed several roles in the Volkswagen and SEAT purchasing areas.

In September 2019, Alfonso Sancha joined SEAT as executive vice-president for purchasing, replacing Klaus Ziegler, who became head of purchasing for connectivity, e-mobility and driver-assistance systems for the Volkswagen Group worldwide. Among other objectives, Sancha was appointed to develop SEAT's electric strategy in the purchasing area and to expand the brand's operations in North Africa and Latin America.
