= Eduard Fresenius =

German entrepreneur and pharmacist (1874–1946)

Eduard Fresenius (November 17 1874, Frankfurt am Main – February 10, 1946, Bad Homburg) was a German entrepreneur and pharmacist.

In 1912, Eduard Fresenius founded German company Fresenius. Eduard Fresenius was married. Else Fernau, Eduard's foster daughter, and her husband Hans Kröner became leaders of the Fresenius company after the death of Eduard Fresenius.

== History ==
Fresenius and his wife owned the Hirsch Apotheke, a "longstanding apothecary founded in 1462". His adopted daughter Else Kroner (who would later also be a pharmacist) inherited the business in 1946, along with her adopted father's small medical manufacturing company. Else's biological father died when she was three years old; she then lived with her mother at Fresenius' home. Fresenius' marriage was childless.

== See also ==
- Fresenius (company)
- Else Kröner-Fresenius-Foundation
