= Julie von Massow =

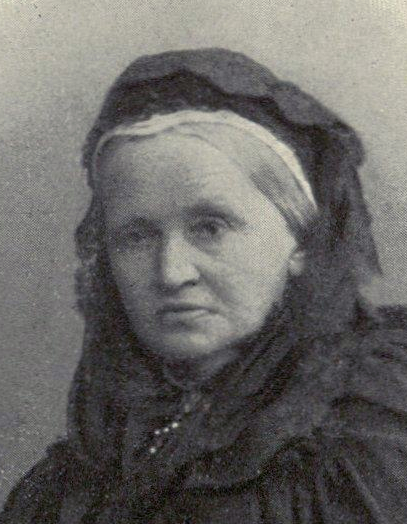
Julie von Massow

Julie von Massow (24 November 1825 – 5 March 1901) was a Prussian woman who started a movement, Ut Omnes Unum, "that all may be one", which promoted reconciliation between the Christian churches, a policy known as reunionism.

== Biography ==
Julie von Massow, née von Behr, was born in Pinnow, district of Greifswald (today part of Murchin) into a Pomeranian noble family, which held high positions in the court and government of Prussia. The visitors to her salon came from the highest echelons of society, and included Bismarck, Alexander von Humboldt, and members of the noble Stolberg family. She was originally Lutheran, but converted to Catholicism in 1885.

== Ut Omnes Unum ==
Von Massow's prayer society came about in a cultural atmosphere so divided by confessionalism that it prompted calls for reunionism (as it came to be called) from both Protestant and Catholic sections. One development was the so-called Erfurt Conference of 1860, a somewhat impromptu gathering of Catholic and Protestant scholars and dignitaries. Such a meeting, however, was so controversial that when the organizer of the conference, the Catholic priest Friedrich Michelis, was seen after the conference riding the train from Erfurt to Halle with Protestant historian and conference participant Heinrich Leo, newspapers in Berlin and Rome reported the news, prompting speculation that the Jesuits were trying to forcefully convert Lutherans. As a result, Michelis was sued for holding an unauthorized assembly, and Leo (a professor at the University of Halle-Wittenberg) was forbidden to examine future high school teachers. Another signal of reunionist sympathy came in 1861, when Wilhelm Emmanuel Freiherr von Ketteler, Bishop of Mainz, published a book on reconciliation, Freiheit, Autorität, und Kirche, in which he proposed the founding of a prayer society "for the Reunion of Christendom". Von Massow, who counted popes, bishops (including von Ketteler), and cardinals among her friends, can be said to have answered that call.

In 1862, von Massow and her husband (a member of the Prussian House of Lords) began a program of organized prayer, "praying the Psalter according to a fixed schedule, as in the Roman Breviary". The idea was to establish a unity of sorts between the denominations. The von Massows' influence was such that friends soon did the same, and quickly a movement (organized as Psalmenbund in 1862) swept Germany, before it spread to Greece, Sweden, and even the United States (among a Lutheran congregation in Allentown, Pennsylvania). In 1878, von Massow added a prayer society, the Gebetsverein, which prayed a number of prayers (including "Veni Creator Spiritus" by Rabanus Maurus) "with the intention that all may be one". A journal based on the movement was founded (also named Ut Omnes Unum, published from 1879 to 1901 in Erfurt), and weekly calendars were printed. In 1883, von Massow endowed a yearly mass ad tollendum schisma, "to bring schisma to an end", to be said at the grave of Saint Boniface in Fulda.

Catholic organizations sprang up mirroring the originally Lutheran organization—the Petrusverein, the Gebetsverein für Deutschland, and the Canisiusgebetsverein. In 1888, Pope Leo XIII offered indulgences for the daily prayer of the "reunion rosary". He received von Massow in a special audience and awarded her a medal with the inscription Ut Omnes Unum on the one side and a likeness of Saint Boniface and the text ein Volk, ein Glaube on the other. During the movement's heyday, their journal was produced by Lutheran and Catholic contributors, working together to further the reunification of Christianity in Germany. However, von Massow converted to Catholicism in 1885 and the Catholic editor of the journal censured a number of Lutheran contributions; this caused most of the Lutheran contributors to the journal and the movement to desert the movement. Von Massow founded a new journal, Friedensblätter, which for a while competed with Ut Omnes Unum. The two journals merged in 1900, and the ensuing journal was published until World War I. The Psalmenbund and Gebetsverein became affiliated with the 15th-century Brotherhood of Our Lady of Sorrows in Rome.
