= Fresenius (company) =

German health company

Fresenius SE & Co. KGaA
- Company type: Public
- Traded as: FWB: FRE; DAX component
- ISIN: DE0005785604
- Industry: Health care
- Founded: 1912; 114 years ago
- Founder: Eduard Fresenius
- Headquarters: Bad Homburg vor der Höhe, Germany
- Key people: Michael Sen (CEO and chairman of the management board); Wolfgang Kirsch (Chairman of the supervisory board)
- Products: infusion pumps, medication, hospitals, medical care
- Services: Dialysis
- Revenue: ▲€22.3 billion (2023)
- Operating income: ▲€2.26 billion (2023)
- Net income: ▲€1.51 billion (2023)
- Total assets: ▼€45.3 billion (2023)
- Total equity: ▼€19.7 billion (2023)
- Owner: Else Kröner-Fresenius Foundation (26.6%)
- Number of employees: 193,865 (2023)
- Website: www.fresenius.com

Fresenius SE & Co. KGaA is a German multinational health care company based in Bad Homburg vor der Höhe. It provides products and services for dialysis in hospitals, as well as inpatient and outpatient medical care. The company is involved in hospital management and in engineering and services for medical centers and other health care facilities. The company was ranked 411th in the 2023 Forbes Global 2000 list.

== Operations ==
There are four divisions:

- Fresenius Medical Care, a publicly traded company of which Fresenius owns 30.8%, focuses on patients with chronic kidney failure. With its North American headquarters in Waltham, Massachusetts, it holds a 38% market share in the dialysis market in the United States.
- Fresenius Helios is the largest hospital operator and provider of inpatient and outpatient services in Germany. The Helios Kliniken has more than 110 hospitals and more than 30,000 beds, treating over 4 million patients annually.
- Fresenius Kabi is a supplier of essential drugs, clinical nutrition products, and medical devices. It produces generic versions of intravenous oncology products, such as Paclitaxel, Irinotecan, Oxaliplatin, Gemcitabine, Cytarabine, Carboplatin, Topotecan, Docetaxel, and Epirubicin.
- Fresenius Vamed develops and manages health care facilities.

=== Structure ===
- Fresenius SE & Co. KGaA
  - Fresenius Medical Care
    - NxStage Medical, Inc.
  - Fresenius Helios
    - Helios Kliniken GmbH
      - Humaine Kliniken
      - IDC Salud Holding S.L.U. (Quirónsalud)
      - Damp Group
  - Fresenius Kabi AG
    - Labesfal SA
    - Fresenius Kabi Oncology Plc
    - Dabur Pharma Ltd
    - APP Pharmaceuticals, Inc
    - Fenwal Holdings, Inc.
  - Fresenius Vamed
- Calea UK

== History ==
The company was founded by Eduard Fresenius in 1912. Fresenius died in 1946. His foster-daughter and protégée, Else Kröner, inherited the company after completing pharmacy school. Kröner rescued the company from significant debts by laying off the majority of staff and restructuring the business. Kröner died in 1988. Kröner's will left all of her assets to the Else Kröner-Fresenius Foundation for medical research funding.

In 1966, the company began to sell dialysis machines. In 1982, the company converted to a joint stock company. In 1983, the company began producing polysulfone fiber membranes. In 1986, it became a public company, listing shares on the Frankfurt Stock Exchange.

In 1996, the company merged its dialysis business into National Medical Care to form Fresenius Medical Care. In 1999, the company acquired the international nutrition business of Pharmacia & Upjohn and merged it with Fresenius Pharma to form Fresenius Kabi.https://www.fresenius.com/1294 In 2001, the company acquired Wittgensteiner Kliniken, a major operator of private hospitals in Germany. In 2005, the company acquired Helios. In March 2005, Fresenius Kabi AG acquired Labesfal (Laboratório de Especialidades Farmacêuticas Almiro S.A.). In September 2006, Helios Kliniken acquired a majority stake in Humaine Kliniken. HUMAINE operates six acute and post acute care hospitals in the fields of neurology, oncology and traumatology.

On 16 July 2007 the company completed its conversion from an Aktiengesellschaft (AG - German public limited company) to a Societas Europaea, the European Union-wide equivalent. The company changed its legal status once again on 28 January 2011, becoming a Kommanditgesellschaft auf Aktien (KGaA - German partnership limited by shares) with a Societas Europaea as a partner with unlimited liability (SE & Co. KGaA).

In August 2008, Fresenius Kabi acquired 73.3% of Dabur Pharma of India. The following month, it also acquired APP Pharmaceuticals, Inc. In October 2011, the company agreed to acquire 51% of the share capital in Katholisches Klinikum Duisburg hospital. Also in October 2011, Helios Kliniken acquired 94.7% of the share capital in Damp Group. In September 2013, Fresenius acquired 41 hospitals from Rhön-Klinikum for €3.07 billion. In 2014, Fresenius sold its 5% stake in Rhön-Klinikum.

In November 2014, the company announced that its Russian partners, Sistema and Zenitco Finance Management, agreed to terminate their joint venture agreement that had been established in April 2014. The termination was prompted by changing political and regulatory circumstances in the region.

In January 2016, Fresenius Kabi announced that it would acquire Becton Dickinson's prescription drug business. In February 2016, Fresenius Helios acquired the municipal hospital in Velbert, North Rhine-Westphalia. In January 2017, Fresenius acquired the largest Spanish hospital group, the Grupo Hospitalario Quirónsalud for €5.76 billion and merged it into the Helios Group, establishing the biggest hospital group of Europe. In September 2017, Fresenius Kabi acquired Merck KGaA's biosimilars business. In February 2019, Fresenius Medical Care acquired NxStage, a US-based maker of in-home dialysis devices, for $2 billion. In March 2022, Fresenius joined InterWell Health and Cricket Health to form a new InterWell Health brand focused on services for the earlier stages of kidney disease.

== Controversies ==
=== Concerns of use of hydroxyethyl starch and threats against researcher ===
In 2012, a paper was published raising concerns regarding the use of hydroxyethyl starch in sepsis. Fresenius Kabi, which makes the product, threatened legal action against the main author, Danish scientist Anders Perner.

=== Quality issues ===
A January 2013 investigation by the United States Food and Drug Administration revealed widespread fraud in Fresenius' quality control testing at its manufacturing plant in Kalyani, West Bengal. Claiming that it was unaware of the lab's wrongdoing, Fresenius executives responded by halting production, firing the plant managers, and recalling the affected medications. In 2015, Fresenius Kabi pleaded guilty to breaches of United Kingdom's Medicines Act 1968 and was fined £500,000 by the Sheffield Crown Court for supplying faulty insulin syringes containing no insulin, leading to the death of Neil Judge from diabetic ketoacidosis in 2010.

=== Bribery allegations ===
In 2019, the company paid $231 million to the United States Department of Justice to settle allegations of civil bribery to obtain business in Angola, Saudi Arabia, Morocco, and Spain.

In January 2020, the Süddeutsche Zeitung reported on tricks used by the health care group Fresenius, according to a case study by the Steuerjustigkeit network. The study shows that it is by no means just US digital groups that are shifting their profits to low-tax countries and that Fresenius is trying to reduce the tax burden by legal means with the help of branches in so-called tax havens and subsidiaries. Tax avoidance is not a prohibited tax evasion.

=== 2022 Russian invasion in Ukraine ===
In response to the 2022 Russian invasion of Ukraine, Fresenius Medical Care continued its operations in Russia. Despite global calls for businesses to cease operations in Russia, the company has not made any official statements regarding changes to its business activities in the country.
