= Akiko Iwasaki =

Immunobiologist

- 岩崎明子
- Born: Iga, Mie Prefecture, Japan
- Education: University of Toronto, National Institutes of Health
- Awards: National Academy of Medicine elected member
- Scientific career
- Fields: Immunobiology, molecular biology, cellular biology, developmental biology
- Workplaces: Yale University, Howard Hughes Medical Institute

External videos
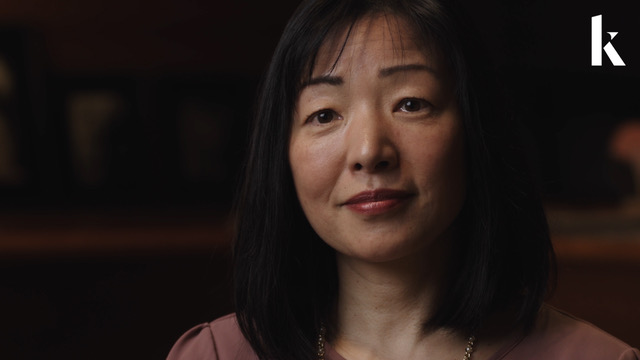
- "Long Covid: A parallel pandemic", Akiko Iwasaki and others, Knowable Magazine, August 8, 2022.

Akiko Iwasaki (岩崎明子, Iwasaki Akiko) is a Sterling Professor of Immunobiology and Molecular, Cellular and Developmental Biology at Yale University. She is also a principal investigator at the Howard Hughes Medical Institute. Her research interests include innate immunity, autophagy, inflammasomes, sexually transmitted infections, herpes simplex virus, human papillomavirus, respiratory virus infections, influenza infection, T cell immunity, commensal bacteria, COVID-19, and long COVID.

Iwasaki was elected to the National Academy of Sciences in 2018. She was the 2023–2024 president of the American Association of Immunologists.

== Biography ==
Iwasaki was born and raised in Iga, Japan. Her father was a physicist, and her mother campaigned for women's labour rights. She has two sisters. After high school she moved to Toronto, Canada, where in 1994, she received her bachelor's degree in biochemistry and physics from the University of Toronto. She had hopes of becoming a mathematician or physicist like her father. However, her interests changed after taking an immunology class.

Iwasaki earned her doctoral degree in immunology from the University of Toronto in 1998. Iwasaki did her postdoctoral fellow at the National Institutes of Health in the lab of mucosal immunologist Brian Lee Kelsall. In 2000, she started her own lab at Yale University. In 2022, Iwasaki was awarded a Sterling Professorship, the highest academic honor professors receive at Yale University.

== Major contributions ==
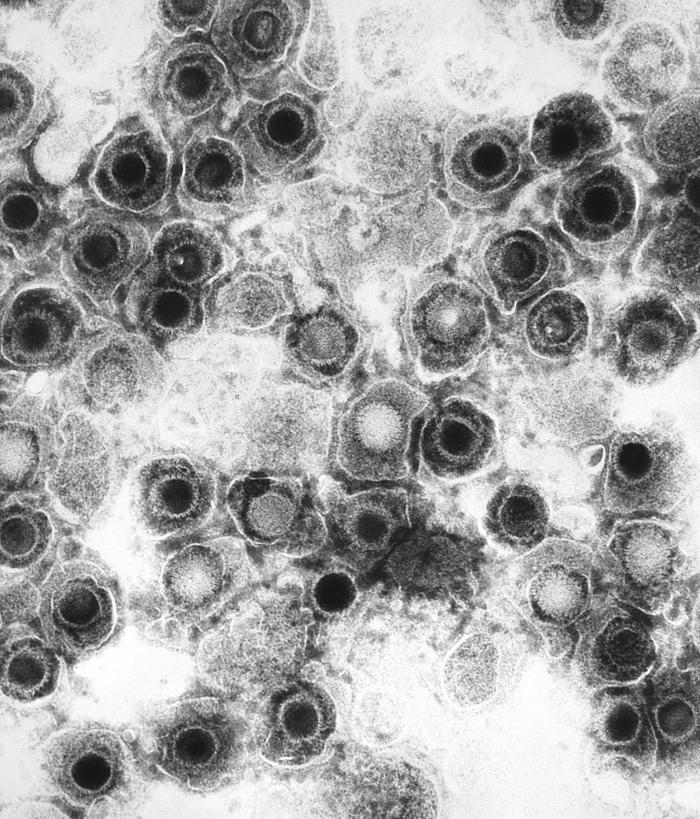
Herpes simplex virions, TEM. Herpes simplex virus is one of the many viruses Iwasaki studies.

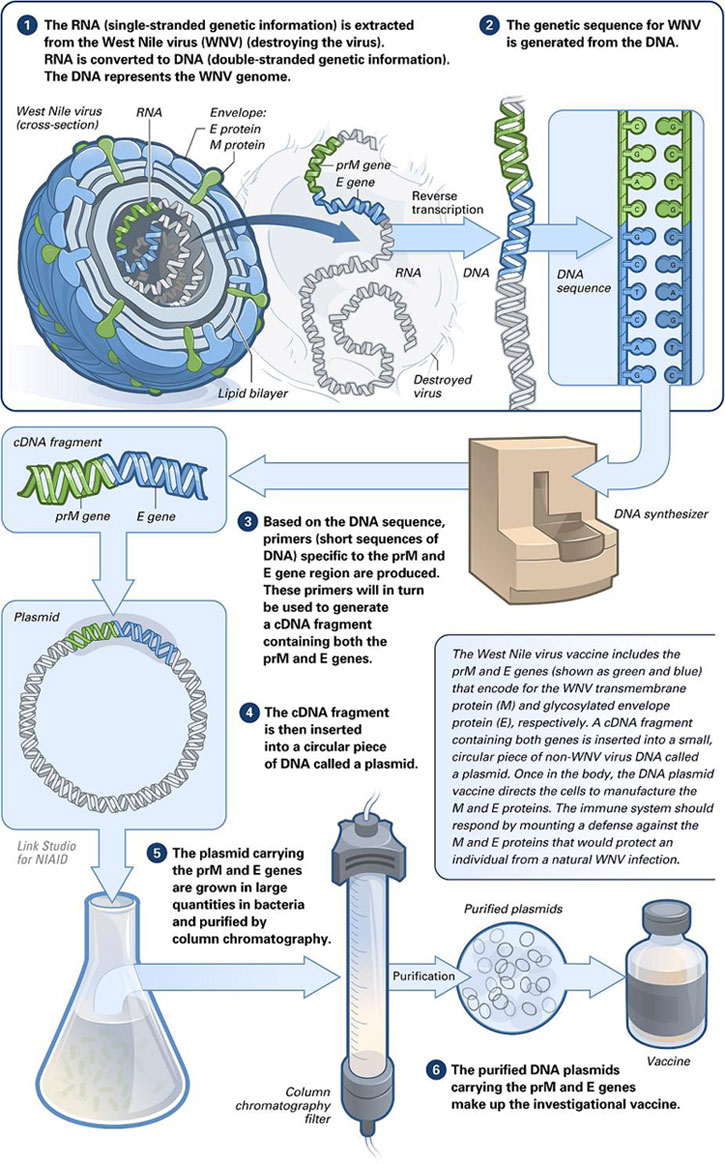
Making of a DNA vaccine. Iwasaki investigated how DNA vaccination elicit an immune response.

While working on her PhD project of how DNA vaccines elicit an immune response, Iwasaki was among the first to show that antigen-presenting cells were in the blood, not the muscle. At the time scientists thought muscle cells were essential for alerting the immune system of foreign proteins, or antigens, coded for by the vaccines because the DNA vaccines work best when injected into the muscle.

Iwasaki's research continues to focus on understanding innate immunity and how that information is used to produce protective adaptive immunity. Iwasaki and her team study immune responses to influenza in the lungs and herpes simplex virus in the genital tract. Overall, the goal is to design effective vaccines or microbiocides for the prevention of transmission of viral and bacterial pathogens. Iwasaki has developed a two-stage vaccination strategy called "prime and pull" that involves a conventional vaccine as a first step and then application of chemokines to the target tissue as a second step. Based on this strategy, Iwasaki has developed a vaccine that is currently in a clinical trial to treat women with precancerous lesions in the cervix to prevent cervical cancer. Serving on Yale University's Science Strategy Committee, Iwasaki has advocated for harnessing the beneficial aspects of inflammation to "combat widespread diseases like stroke, heart disease, and diabetes".

According to Google Scholar, one of her publications, "Toll-like receptor control of the adaptive immune response," has been cited over 5,300 times as of August 2023 and was published in Nature Immunology in October 2004. In January 2015, one of Iwasaki's studies was published in the Proceedings of the National Academy of Sciences. The study, "Temperature-dependent innate defense against the common cold virus limits viral replication at warm temperature in mouse airway cells", investigates the relationship between temperature and immune responses.

Building on her interests in immune responses to viral infection, Iwasaki has also led research into human rhinovirus and Zika virus. Iwasaki's group was notably the first to create a mouse model of a vaginal Zika infection. Most recently, Iwasaki has delved into research looking at the immune response of COVID-19 patients and sex differences in SARS-CoV-2 infection. She is also examining the effects of long COVID and other syndromes that occur following acute infections.

== COVID-19 and long COVID research ==
Iwasaki has become a prominent voice for public scientific literacy, regularly explaining complex immunological findings to general audiences through social media and in outlets such as Quanta Magazine, STAT News, and Yale Medicine.

Her long COVID research has included studies identifying distinctive immune and hormonal signatures associated with the condition, including reduced cortisol levels and altered T-cell activity, and later work providing evidence that autoantibodies targeting the brain and nervous system may contribute to neurological symptoms in a subset of patients, with passive transfer of patient antibodies into mice reproducing these features.

== Personal life ==
Iwasaki is well known as an advocate for women in science, including voicing support for affordable childcare. Sshe has spoken out in support of immigrants and their contributions to science. Iwasaki has gained a following on Twitter for her public health advice about COVID-19, advocating for social distancing early in the pandemic.

== Honors ==
- Burroughs Wellcome Fund Career Award in Biomedical Sciences, Burroughs Wellcome Fund (2000)
- Ethel Donaghue Women's Health Program Investigator Award, Ethel Donaghue Women's Health Program (2003)
- Wyeth Lederle Young Investigator Award, Infectious Diseases Society of America (2003)
- Burroughs Wellcome Fund Investigator in Pathogenesis in Infectious Diseases, Burroughs Wellcome Fund (2005)
- BD Biosciences Investigator Award, American Associations of Immunologist (AAI) (2011)
- Eli Lilly and Company Research Award, American Society of Microbiology (2012)
- Inspiring Yale award (2017)
- Yale's Charles W. Bohmfalk Teaching Award (2018)
- Elected as a member of the National Academy of Sciences (2018)
- Elected as a member of the National Academy of Medicine (2019)
- Seymour & Vivian Milstein Award for Excellence in Interferon & Cytokine Research, International Cytokine and Interferon Society (2019)
- Elected as a member of the European Molecular Biology Organization (2021)
- Elected as a member of the American Academy of Arts and Sciences (2021)
- Appointed Sterling Professor of Immunobiology and of Molecular, Cellular & Developmental Biology at Yale (2022)
- Lupus Insight Prize (LIP), Lupus Research Alliance (2022)
- President of the American Association of Immunologists (2023–2024)
- Else Kröner-Fresenius Prize for Medical Research (2023)
- Howard Taylor Ricketts Prize, University of Chicago (2023)
- Dr. William E. Paul Distinguished Innovator Award (DIA), Lupus Research Alliance (2023)
- TIME 100 Most Influential People (2024)
- Included in TIME 100 Health list of most influential people in global health (2024)
- Forbes 50 over 50 Innovation (2024)
- Carnegie Corporation of New York Great Immigrants, Great Americans (2025)
- Keio Medical Science Prize (2025)

== Publications ==
- Lu-Culligan, A; Iwasaki, A (6 October 2020). "The Role of Immune Factors in Shaping Fetal Neurodevelopment". Annual Review of Cell and Developmental Biology. 36 (1): 441–468. doi:10.1146/annurev-cellbio-021120-033518. ISSN 1081-0706. PMC 9034439. PMID 32722920.
- Oh, JE; Iijima, N; Song, E; Lu, P; Klein, J; Jiang, R; Kleinstein, SH; Iwasaki, A (July 2019). "Migrant memory B cells secrete luminal antibody in the vagina". Nature. 571 (7763): 122–126. Bibcode:2019Natur.571..122O. doi:10.1038/s41586-019-1285-1. PMC 6609483. PMID 31189952.
- Sasai, M; Sakaguchi, N; Ma, JS; Nakamura, S; Kawabata, T; Bando, H; Lee, Y; Saitoh, T; Akira, S; Iwasaki, A; Standley, DM; Yoshimori, T; Yamamoto, M (August 2017). "Essential role for GABARAP autophagy proteins in interferon-inducible GTPase-mediated host defense". Nature Immunology. 18 (8): 899–910. doi:10.1038/ni.3767. PMID 28604719. S2CID 38108662.
- Iijima, N; Iwasaki, A (26 May 2016). "Access of protective antiviral antibody to neuronal tissues requires CD4 T-cell help". Nature. 533 (7604): 552–6. Bibcode:2016Natur.533..552I. doi:10.1038/nature17979. PMC 4883597. PMID 27225131.
- Foxman, E. F.; Storer, J. A.; Fitzgerald, M. E.; Wasik, B. R.; Hou, L.; Zhao, H.; Iwasaki, A. (2015). "Temperature-dependent innate defense against the common cold virus limits viral replication at warm temperature in mouse airway cells". Proceedings of the National Academy of Sciences. 112 (3): 827–832. Bibcode:2015PNAS..112..827F. doi:10.1073/pnas.1411030112. PMC 4311828. PMID 25561542.
- Iwasaki, A; Pillai, P (2014). "Innate immunity to influenza virus infection". Nature Reviews Immunology. 14 (5): 315–328. doi:10.1038/nri3665. PMC 4104278. PMID 24762827.
- Iwasaki, A (21 September 2012). "Innate immune recognition of HIV-1". Immunity. 37 (3): 389–98. doi:10.1016/j.immuni.2012.08.011. PMC 3578946. PMID 22999945.
- Iwasaki, A.; Medzhitov, R. (2010). "Regulation of adaptive immunity by the innate immune system". Science. 327 (5963): 291–295. Bibcode:2010Sci...327..291I. doi:10.1126/science.1183021. PMC 3645875. PMID 20075244.
- Iwasaki, A.; Medzhitov, R. (2004). "Toll-like receptor control of the adaptive immune responses". Nature Immunology. 5 (4): 987–995. doi:10.1038/ni1112. PMID 15454922. S2CID 11284900.
