= Friedrich Bernhard Ferdinand Michelis =

German theologian and philosopher

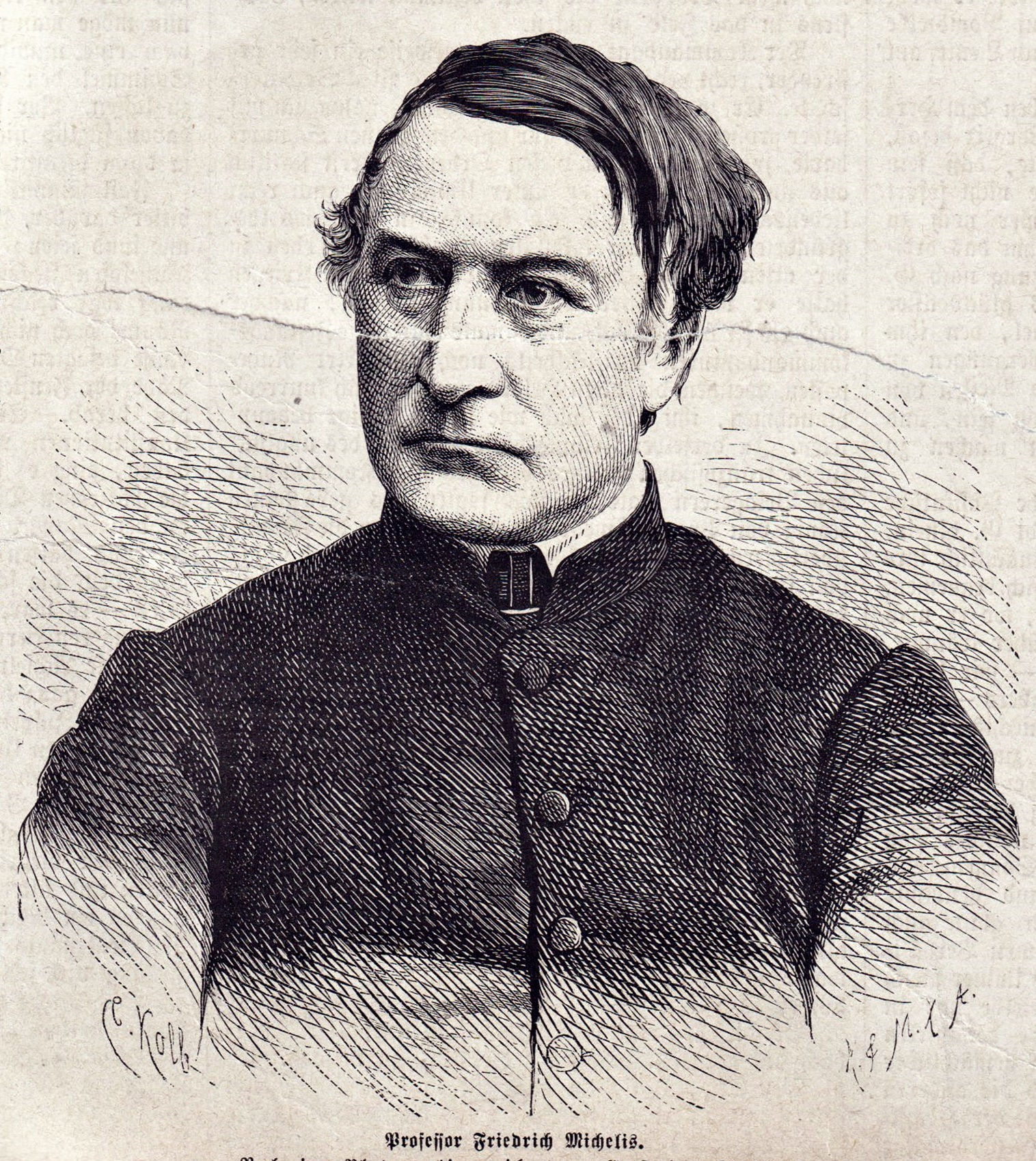
Friedrich Michelis (1873), from the Allgemeine Familienzeitung Stuttgart

Friedrich Bernhard Ferdinand Michelis (July 27, 1815 – May 28, 1886) was a German theologian and philosopher born in Münster.

== Biography ==
He studied philosophy and theology at the Academy of Münster, receiving his ordination in 1838. From 1845 he was a chaplain and school teacher in Duisburg, and later (1849–54) an instructor at the Episcopal Theological Institute in Paderborn. From 1855 to 1864 he served as pastor in Münster-Albachten, and from 1864 to 1872 was a professor of philosophy at the Lyceum in Braunsberg. In 1860 he participated in the Erfurt conference that would lead to Julie von Massow's Ut Omnes Unum movement, which sought the reunification of Catholicism with Protestantism.

In his writings, Michelis attempted to reconcile the teachings of Plato and those of modern science with the doctrines of Roman Catholicism. In 1866/7, he was prominent in the Prussian Diet as an opponent of Otto von Bismarck's ecclesiastical policy. But he also opposed the influence of the Jesuits and the dogma of papal infallibility in several pamphlets (1869–70), which led to his excommunication.

Michelis was a major figure in the "Old Catholic" movement in Germany, and from 1874 was associated with Old Catholic parish at Freiburg. As a philosopher he was an opponent of materialism, and an outspoken critic of Darwinism and Güntherianism. For a period of time, he was editor of the journal Natur und Offenbarung (Nature and Epiphany), the first major journal in Germany devoted to a religiously founded popular science. He also edited Der Katholik, an organ especially directed against the Jesuits.

== Writings ==
Among his better known writings are the following:

- Der kirchliche Standpunkt der Naturforschung (Standpoint on the religious nature of research), 1855
- Der Materialismus als Köhlerglaube (Materialism as blind faith), 1856
- Die Philosophie Platons in ihrer inneren Beziehung zur geoffenbarten Wahrheit (The philosophy of Plato in its internal relationship to revealed truth), (1858-1860, two volumes)
- Renan's Roman vom Leben Jesu. Eine deutsche Antwort auf die französische Blasphemie (Renan's novel of the life of Jesus, a German answer to the French blasphemy), 1864.
- Preußen's Beruf für Deutschland und die Weltgeschichte. Ein freies Wort zur rechten Zeit (Prussia's occupation of Germany and World History, a free word at the right time), 1863
- De Aristotele Plantonis in idearum doctrina adversario. Commentatio critica, 1864
- Anti-Darwinische Beobachtungen (Anti-Darwinian observations), 1877
- Die Philosophie des Bewusstseins (The philosophy of consciousness), 1877
- Haeckelogonie. Ein akademischer Protest (Haeckelogony, an academic protest), 1876
