= O filii et filiae =

Christian hymn

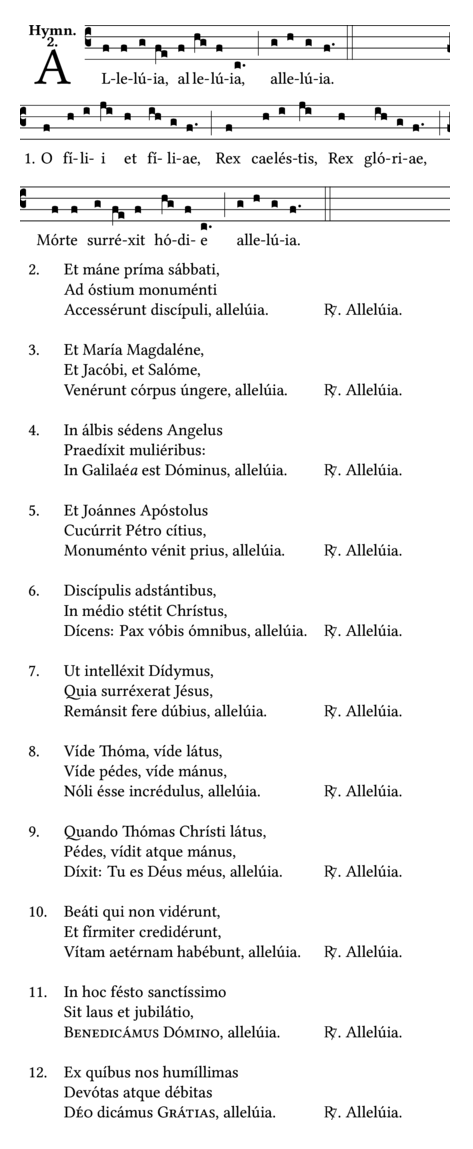

O filii et filiae
Melody of "O filii et filiae"

O FILII ET FILIAE CHORAL
Choral arrangement of "O filii et filiae"

O filii et filiae is a Christian hymn celebrating Easter. It is attributed to Jean Tisserand (d. 1497), a Franciscan friar.

== Text ==
As commonly found in hymnals, it comprises up to twelve stanzas; each consisting of three verses followed by the exclamation "Alleluia":

1. O filii et filiae
Rex caelestis, Rex gloriae
Morte surrexit hodie.
Alleluia.

It originally comprised only nine stanzas (those commencing with "Discipulis adstantibus", "Postquam audivit Didymus", "Beati qui non viderunt" being early additions to the hymn). "L'aleluya du jour de Pasques" is a trope on the versicle and response (closing Lauds and Vespers) which it paraphrases in the last two stanzas:

11. In hoc festo sanctissimo
Sit laus et jubilatio:
Benedicamus Domino.
Alleluia.

12. De quibus nos humillimas
Devotas atque debitas
Deo dicamus gratias.
Alleluia.

There are several translations into English verse by non-Catholics, notably "O Sons and Daughters" by John Mason Neale. This translation is sometimes reworked as "Ye Sons and Daughters of the King". Catholic translations comprise one by an anonymous author in the "Evening Office", 1748 ("Young men and maids, rejoice and sing"), Father Caswall's "Ye sons and daughters of the Lord" and Charles Kent's "O maids and striplings, hear love's story", all three being given in Shipley, Annus Sanctus. The Latin texts vary both in the arrangement and the wording of the stanzas. The following is the translation of the above Latin verses by Neale as they appear in the New English Hymnal, where some stanzas have been omitted:

1. Ye sons and daughters of the King,
Whom heavenly hosts in glory sing,
To-day the grave hath lost its sting.
Alleluya!

9. On this most holy day of days,
To God your hearts and voices raise
In laud, and jubilee, and praise.
Alleluya!

10. And we with Holy Church unite,
As evermore is just and right,
In glory to the King of Light.
Alleluya!

== Melody ==
The melody begins with a three-fold Alleluia, sung as a refrain, beginning and ending on the tonic. The first and second lines of each stanza share the same melody, and the third line takes its melody from the refrain.

The rhythm of the hymn is that of number and not of accent or of classical quantity. However, the melody to which it is sung can scarcely be divorced from the lilt of triple time. As a result, there is sometimes the appearance of a conflict between the accent of the Latin words and the real, if unintentional, stress of the melody. A number of hymnals give the melody in plain-song notation, and (theoretically, at least) this would permit the accented syllables of the Latin text to receive an appropriate stress of the voice. Commonly, however, the hymnals adopt the modern triple time.

The melody has been used as the inspiration for numerous organ pieces, including settings by French baroque composers Marc-Antoine Charpentier (H.312 and H.356), Pierre Dandrieu, and Jean-Francois Dandrieu, as well as variations by Alexandre Guilmant and Pierre Jean Porro.

== History ==
The hymn was very popular in France, whence it has spread to other countries. The 19th-century volume "The Liturgical Year" entitles it "The Joyful Canticle" and gives Latin text with English prose translation, with a triple Alleluia preceding and following the hymn. In certain hymnals, however, this triple Alleluia is sung also between the stanzas; and in others, greater particularity is indicated in the distribution of the stanzas and of the Alleluias, which has a great effect, in the words of John Mason Neale, "It is scarcely possible for any one, not acquainted with the melody, to imagine the jubilant effect of the triumphant Alleluia attached to apparently less important circumstances of the Resurrection. It seems to speak of the majesty of that event, the smallest portions of which are worthy to be so chronicled." The conflict of stress and word-accent led Neale to speak of the "rude simplicity" of the poem and to ascribe the hymn to the twelfth century in his volume (although the note prefixed to his own translation assigns the hymn to the thirteenth century). The French priest Jacques Paul Migne also declares it to be very ancient. It is only recently that its true authorship has been discovered, with the Dictionary of Hymnology (2nd ed., 1907) tracing it back only to the year 1659, with earlier sources finding it in a Roman Processional of the sixteenth century.

The hymn was assigned in the various French Paroissiens to the Benediction of the Blessed Sacrament, on Easter Sunday.

It was paraphrased in German in 1885 as "Ihr Christen, singet hocherfreut".

A version of the song was created for SATB by Ivo Antognini in 2014.
