= Marianne Müller =

German soprano and actress

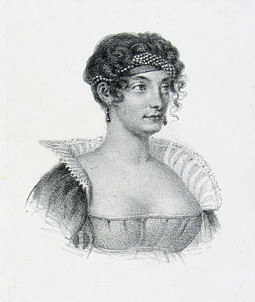
- Born: Marianne Hellmuth; 1 January 1772; Mainz, Germany
- Died: 30 May 1851 (aged 78); Berlin, Germany,
- Occupations: Opera singer, actress
- Parent(s): Johann Friedrich Hellmuth and Franziska Hellmuth

Marianne Müller, née Hellmuth (1 or 4 January 1772 – 31 May 1851) was a German soprano and actress.

== Life ==
Born in Mainz, Müller was the daughter of a singer and voice teacher Franziska Hellmuth and Mainz court musician, Johann Friedrich Hellmuth. She began performing at a very young age. She made her debut singing the part of Gretchen in Anton Schweitzer's Dorfgalle in Bonn in 1780, and appeared as Victorine in Eifersucht auf der Probe in Schwedt in 1785, and as Röschen in Zauberspiegel in Berlin in 1788.

In 1787, she was engaged at the Schweriner Hoftheater and later, from 1788 to 1789, she became a member of the Königliches Theater in Berlin.

Initially, she was employed as an actress, however, over the time, her career slowly moved towards opera. In 1803, she made her debut as Konstanze in Mozart's Die Entführung aus dem Serail. In 1804, she sang the role of Donna Elvira in Don Giovanni, and from 1809 onwards performed Donna Anna. She played the role of Agnes Sorel in Friedrich Schiller's Die Jungfrau von Orleans over 25 times.

On 12 May 1794, she appeared in the Berlin first performance of Mozart’s Die Zauberflöte as The Queen of the Night. In 1815 she became ill and retired in 1816. In 1844 she took part in the 50th anniversary of Die Zauberflöte after the Berlin premiere.

=== Family ===
In 1792 she married Müller, a Prussian officer, and began to use the name since 6 May 1794. After her retirement, she lived in Ruppin with her daughter, a pianist and student of Friedrich Wilkes. Later she moved to Berlin and lived there until she died in 1851.

Her sister Katharine Hellmuth (before 1770 – after 1800) was also an actress and singer.

== Repertoire ==
Below is a list of some of her debut performances.

Year	Role	Opera	Composer
1788	Rosalie	Doktor und Apotheker	Carl Ditters von Dittersdorf
1788	Zémire	Zémire et Azor	André Grétry
1790	Cherubino	Le nozze di Figaro	Mozart
1790	Donna Elvira	Don Giovanni	Mozart
1794	Almanzaris	Oberon	Friederike Sophie Seyler
1794	Pamina, Königin der Nacht	Die Zauberflöte	Mozart
1797	Lodoïska	Lodoïska	Luigi Cherubini
1798	Henriette	Das Sonntagskind	
1801	Marie	Blaubart	
1802	Amanda	Oberon	Friederike Sophie Seyler
1803	Konstanze	Die Entführung aus dem Serail	Mozart
1804	Amena	Cäsar auf Pharmakusa	Antonio Salieri
1804	Donna Elvira	Don Giovanni	Mozart
1805	Carolina	Il matrimonio segreto	Cimarosa
1806	Ilia	Idomeneo	Mozart
1808	Sophie	Sargines	
1809	Agnes Sorel	Die Jungfrau von Orleans	Friedrich Schiller
1809	Agnes Sorel	Agnes Sorel	Adalbert Gyrowetz
1809	Donna Anna	Don Giovanni	Mozart
1812	Mechtilde	Silvana	Weber
1813	Princesse de Navarre	Jean de Paris	François-Adrien Boieldieu
?	Constanze	Die Liebe im Narrenhaus	Carl Ditters von Dittersdorf
?	Sandrina	Il Talismano	Antonio Salieri
?	Pietro	Les deux petits savoyards	Nicolas Dalayrac
?	Marguerite	Richard Coeur-de-Lion	André Ernest Modeste Grétry
