= Paul Leopold Haffner =

German Roman Catholic clergyman

- Bishop of Mainz
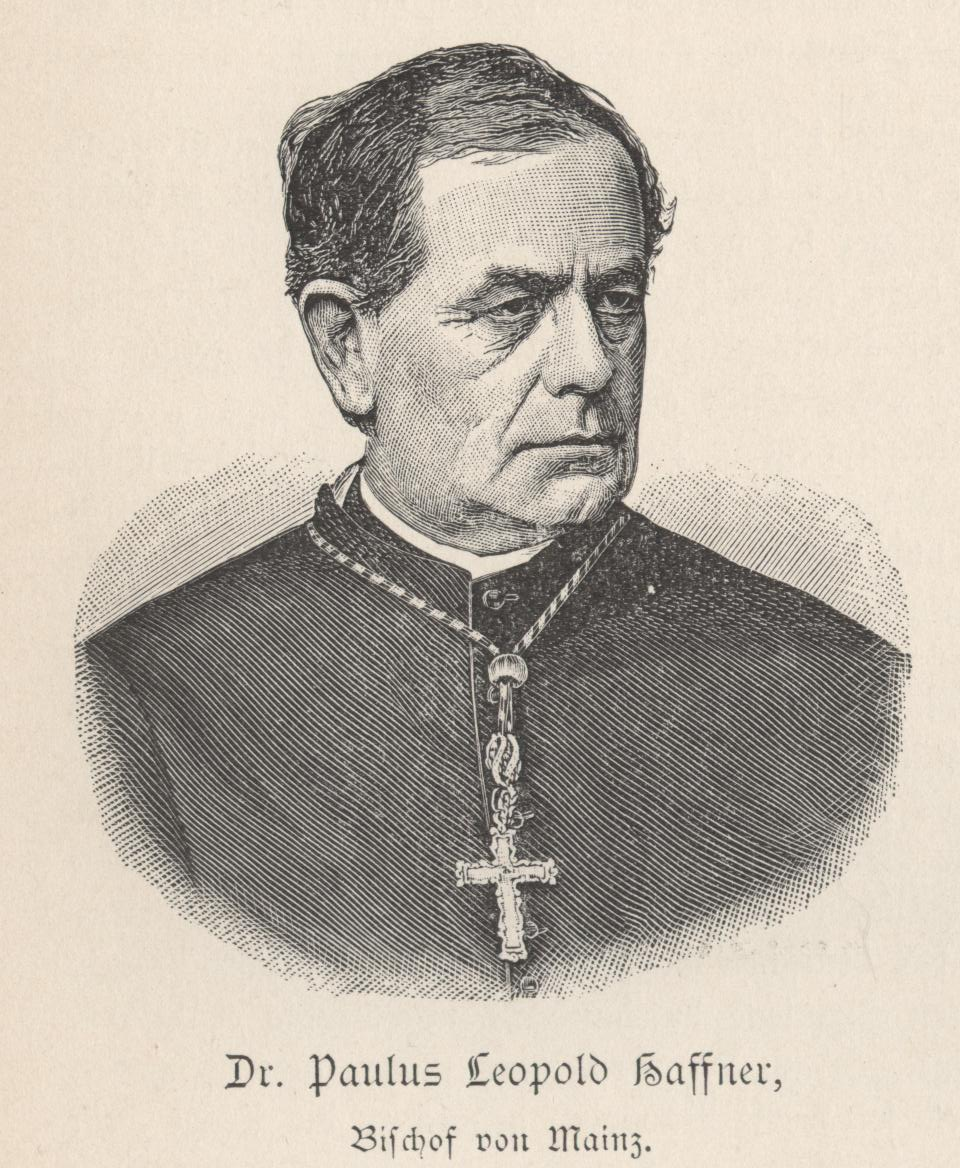
- Haffner in 1892
- Church: Catholic Church
- Diocese: Diocese of Mainz
- In office: 10 June 1886 – 2 November 1899
- Predecessor: Christoph Moufang
- Successor: Heinrich Brück

Orders
- Ordination: 10 August 1852
- Consecration: 25 July 1886 by Christian Roos

Personal details
- Born: 21 January 1829 Horb am Neckar, Kingdom of Württemberg, German Confederation
- Died: 2 November 1899 (aged 70) Mainz, Grand Duchy of Hesse, German Empire
- Coat of arms

Paul Leopold Haffner (21 January 1829, Horb am Neckar – 2 November 1899, Mainz) was a German Roman Catholic clergyman. From 1886 until his death he served as Bishop of Mainz. Along with Johann Baptist Heinrich, he was one of the pioneers of German neo-scholasticism.
