= Katholikentag =

Church gathering

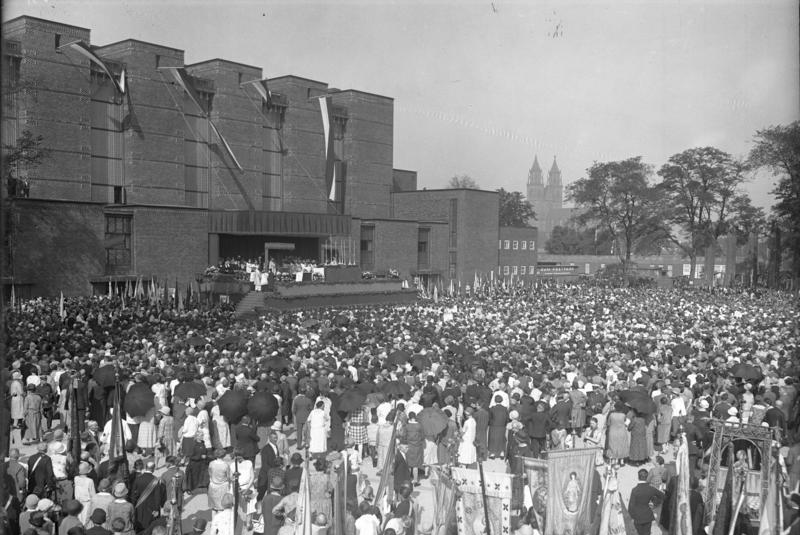
67th Katholikentag in 1928 in Magdeburg

Katholikentag (German: [katoˈliːkn̩ˌtaːk], lit. 'Catholics Day') is a festival-like gathering in German-speaking countries organized by laity of the Catholic Church. Katholikentag festivals occur approximately every 2–4 years in Germany, Switzerland, and Austria.

== Katholikentag in Germany ==
=== History ===
The first official Katholikentag festival was organized by Adam Franz Lennig and held in Mainz from 3 to 6 October 1848. The idea was a "general assembly of Catholic society in Germany" (Generalversammlung des katholischen Vereins Deutschlands), originally intended for delegates of the Catholic Church in Germany. The 87 delegates and about 100 visitors met with the aim of improving relations between the Catholic Church in Germany and the German government.

During the ensuing decades the Katholikentags increased in popularity and fame. They became an opportunity for Catholics to discuss and celebrate their faith. Since then, the Catholic Church in Germany has become one of a set of state religions. Katholikentag in Germany is now managed by the Central Committee for German Catholics. It continues to be a cultural gathering for Germans of the Catholic faith, and major German politicians and celebrities attend the event.

During 1968, members of Katholikentag were among the dissidents and protesters of the encyclical Humanae Vitae.

=== Katholikentag today ===
Katholikentag is now a major national event in Germany. Although major Church officials have become involved with the celebration, it has remained a function of the German Catholic laity, and is not an official ecumenical event, nor is it organized or mandated by the clergy. The 100th Katholikentag took place in Leipzig in 2016.

== Katholikentag in other countries ==
Both Switzerland and Austria have been celebrating Katholikentag for more than 100 years. During recent years the Austrian event has become attended by visitors from other participating countries, namely Poland, the Czech Republic, Slovakia, Hungary, Slovenia, Croatia, and Bosnia and Herzegovina. The most recent such Central European Katholikentag occurred during 2004 and featured more than 80,000 visitors, including Pope John Paul II. The theme of the event was "Christ — the Hope of Europe" (German: Christus — Hoffnung Europas).
