= Wilhelm Emmanuel von Ketteler =

German Catholic theologian and politician (1811–1877)

The Right Reverend Wilhelm Emmanuel Freiherr von Ketteler
- Bishop of Mainz
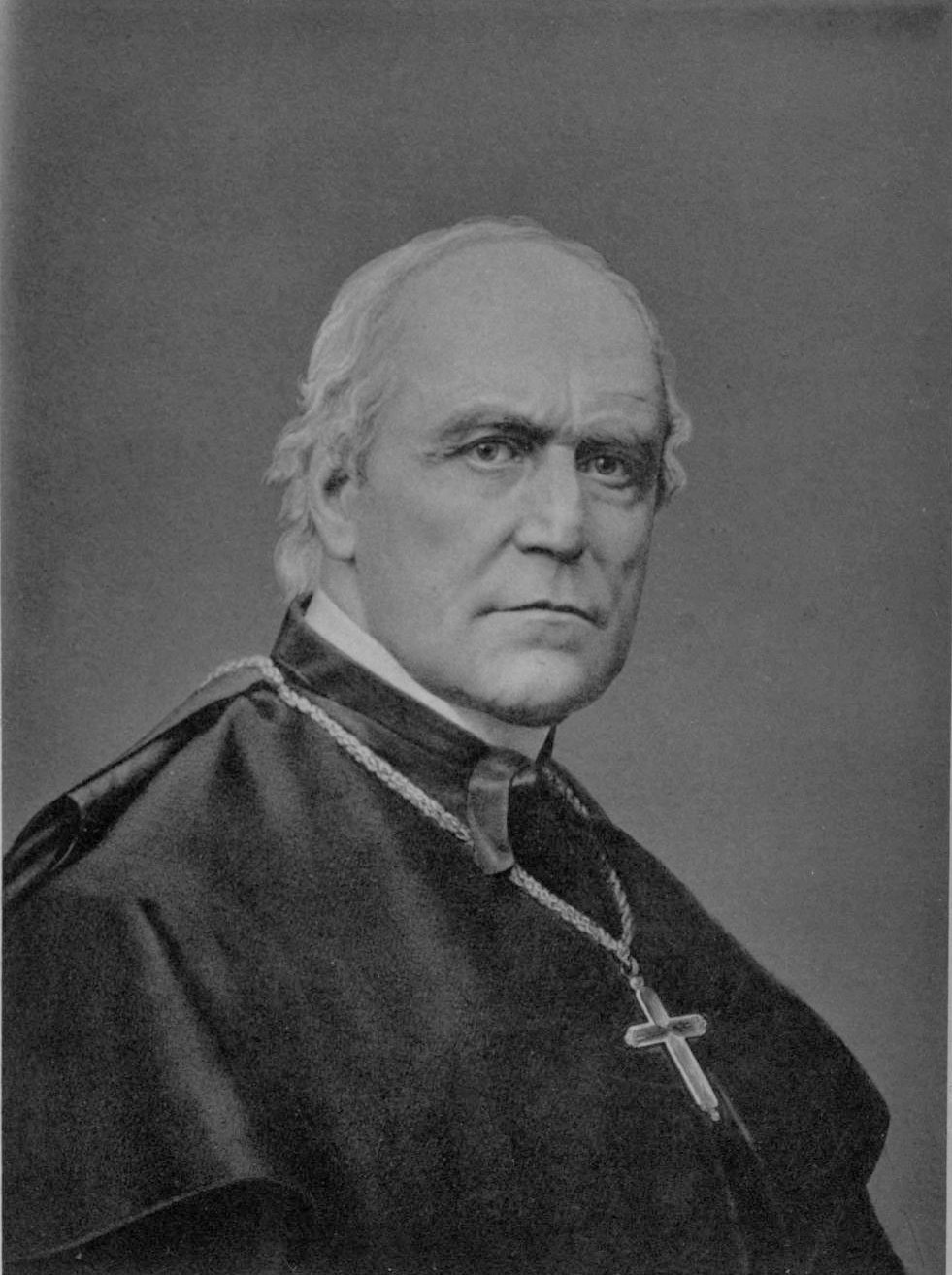
- Church: Latin Church
- Diocese: Mainz
- Appointed: 20 May 1850
- Term ended: 13 July 1877
- Predecessor: Petrus Leopold Kaiser

Orders
- Ordination: 1 June 1844
- Consecration: 25 July 1850 by Hermann von Vicari

Personal details
- Born: 25 December 1811 Münster, Lippe, First French Empire
- Died: 13 July 1877 (aged 65) Burghausen, Bavaria, German Empire
- Coat of arms

Freiherr Wilhelm Emmanuel von Ketteler (25 December 1811 – 13 July 1877) was a German theologian and politician who served as Bishop of Mainz. His social teachings became influential during the papacy of Leo XIII and his encyclical Rerum novarum.

== Early life and ordination ==
Ketteler was born in Münster in Westphalia into the Ketteler noble family. In 1828, he finished matura in Brig, Switzerland. He studied theology at Göttingen, Berlin, Heidelberg, and Munich, and was ordained as a priest in 1844. He dedicated much of his life to maintaining the freedom of the Church from the control of the State, which often brought him into conflict with political powers.

== Bishophood ==
During the 1848 Revolutions, Ketteler was elected as a deputy for the District of Tecklenburg and Warendorf to the Frankfurt National Assembly. During this time, he became noted for his foresight, energy, and eloquence. He established a reputation for his decisiveness, rather than his scholarliness.

In 1850, Ketteler was made bishop of Mainz by order of the Vatican. He was selected over Professor Leopold Schmidt, of Gießen, whose liberal sentiments were not in line with the current Papal beliefs. When elected, Ketteler refused to allow theology students in his diocese to attend lectures at Giessen, and ultimately founded an opposition seminary in the diocese of Mainz itself.

Ketteler founded several religious institutes of School Brothers and School Sisters to work in the various educational agencies he had created. He also worked to create orphanages and rescue homes. In 1851, he founded the congregation of the Sisters of Divine Providence, with Stephanie Amelia Starkenfels de la Roche.

== Death and legacy ==
Ketteler died in 1877, at Burghausen, in Upper Bavaria.

In Mainz, "Workers' Day" is celebrated in honor of Ketteler, and the Herz-Jesu-Kirche was dedicated to him. The fuchsia cultivar "Baron de Ketteler" is named after him. Ketteler's nephew, Klemens von Ketteler, was Germany's envoy in China, and was murdered during the Boxer Rebellion.

He is cited in Pope Benedict's encyclical Deus caritas est for his role in the Catholic social tradition.

== Views ==
In 1861, Ketteler published a book on reconciliation between Catholics and Protestants in Germany, Freiheit, Autorität, und Kirche; in it, he proposed the founding of a prayer society "for the Reunion of Christendom". Ketteler was friends with Julie von Massow, a Lutheran woman from Prussian nobility, who established one of these prayer societies.

Ketteler was opposed the dogma of papal infallibility on the ground that it was being promulgated at an inappropriate time. After the dogma was defined in 1870, he submitted to the decrees.

In 1858, Ketteler issued a pamphlet on the rights of the Roman Catholic Church in Germany, drawing a hard line between the Church and the State. In 1863 he adopted Ferdinand Lassalle's views, and published his Die Arbeitfrage und das Christenthum. He was a vocal opponent of the State in the Kulturkampf provoked by Prince Otto von Bismarck after the publication of the Vatican decrees, and was largely instrumental in compelling von Bismark to retract the pledge he had given to never "go to Canossa." In 1874, Ketteler forbade his clergy from celebrating the anniversary of the Battle of Sedan, and declared the Rhine to be a "Catholic river."

== Notes ==
Catholic Church titles
Preceded by Georg Anton Brinkmann	Prince-Episcopal Delegate for Brandenburg and Pomerania; 1849–1850	Succeeded by Leopold Pelldram
Preceded by Petrus Leopold Kaiser	Bishop of Mainz; 1850–1877	Vacant Title next held by Paul Leopold Haffner interim Administrator Christoph Moufang
