= Petrus Leopold Kaiser =

German Roman Catholic clergyman

Peter Leopold Kaiser
- Bishop of Mainz
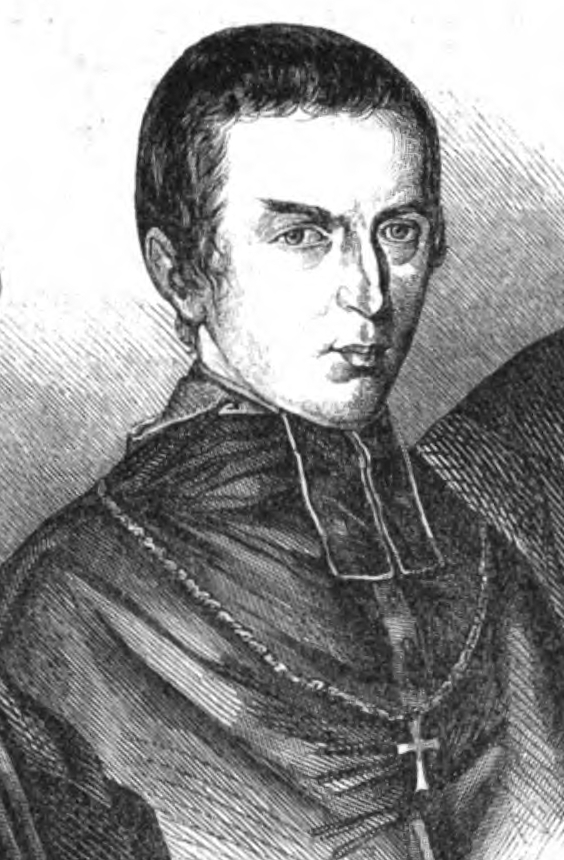
- Church: Catholic Church
- Diocese: Diocese of Mainz
- In office: 6 April 1835 – 30 December 1848
- Predecessor: Johann Jakob Humann
- Successor: Wilhelm Emmanuel von Ketteler

Orders
- Ordination: 21 March 1812
- Consecration: 30 June 1835 by Johann Wilhelm Bausch

Personal details
- Born: 3 November 1788 Mühlheim am Main, Electorate of Mainz, Electoral Rhenish Circle, Holy Roman Empire
- Died: 30 December 1848 (aged 60) Mainz, Grand Duchy of Hesse, German Confederation
- Coat of arms

Peter or Petrus Leopold Kaiser (3 November 1788, Mühlheim am Main - 30 December 1848, Mainz) was a German Roman Catholic clergyman. From 1834 until his death he served as Bishop of Mainz.
