= Piusverein =

The Piusverein (Pius Association) was a Roman Catholic society, founded in 1848 in Germany, and named for Pope Pius IX. Its political direction was conservative and ultramontanist, and its purpose was to form a bridge between Catholics and the political classes. Other societies under this name were subsequently set up, in German-speaking countries.

== The Piusverein in Germany ==
It was founded at Mainz in 1848 by the cathedral canon, Adam Franz Lennig, and Caspar Riffel (died 1856), to organize the Catholics of Germany in defence of their religious freedom and civil rights. The platform and by-laws were published in the Katholik (Mainz, 1848). The organizers of the association called a congress of the Catholic societies of Germany which met at Mainz, 3–6 October 1848. At this assembly 38 societies were represented, and all the Catholic associations of Germany founded to protect religious interests were united into the "Catholic Association of Germany".

The annual congresses of this association led to other organizations; in 1848 the Society of St. Vincent de Paul and the Association of St. Elizabeth; in 1849 the Association of St. Boniface; in 1850 the Society for Christian Art; in 1851 the Catholic Journeymen's Union; these assemblies were the precursors of the "General Congress of the Catholics of Germany" that was held annually.

Academic Pius Associations in Germany, for promoting religious interests and attachment to the Catholic Church among Catholic students, were greatly weakened by the Kulturkampf.

== The Pius Association of Switzerland ==
This was founded in 1855 by Theodore Scherer-Boccard who remained at its head until his death (died 1885). Its aim was to develop and centralize Catholic associational life in Switzerland.

In French-speaking and Italian-speaking Switzerland, the association was known as the Association Pie IX and Società piana respectively.

It was directed by two central committees, and the general meetings were held nearly every year; in addition, there are also cantonal and district assemblies. Many of the local associations had branches for women. From 1899 the society was called the "Swiss Catholic Association"; it then contained 225 groups with 35,000 members. On 22 November 1904, it combined with the "United Societies of Catholic Men and Workingmen" and the "Fédération Romande" to form the "Swiss Catholic Peoples Union".

== The Pius Association for Promoting the Catholic Press of Austria ==
Named after Pope Pius X, it was founded at the Fifth Catholic Congress held in Vienna in 1905 after the presentation by the Jesuit, Victor Kolb, in order to offset liberal daily press. This end was to be gained largely by developing the Catholic daily newspapers of Vienna. The president of the association from its founding was Count Franz Walterskirchen-Walfstal.

It supported two daily newspapers of Vienna, the Reichspost and the Vaterland.

== See also ==
- Boniface Association
