= Benjamin Herder =

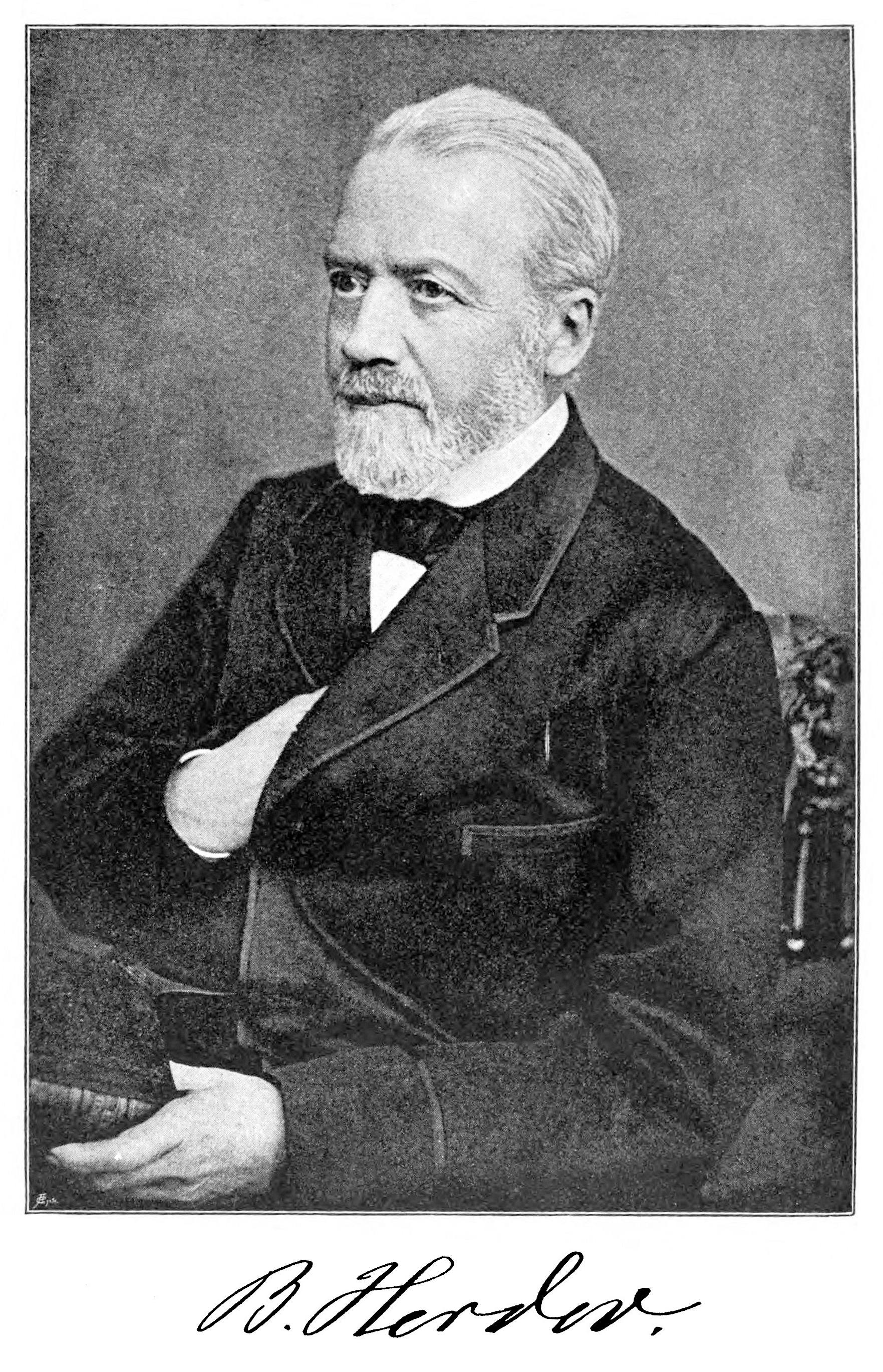
Benjamin Herder

Benjamin Herder (31 July 1818 – 10 November 1888) headed the Verlag Herder from 1856 until 1888. He was the brother of Karl Raphael Herder and the son of Bartholomäus Herder.

== Career ==
Benjamin took charge of the publishing department until his brother's retirement in 1856, when he undertook the sole management. Equipped with a thorough, scholarly education, trained in the book business by his father and under Gauthier de Laguionie in Paris, Benjamin had had his views further broadened early in life by travels through Germany, Austria, France, England, and Italy.

Of a character earnest and religious, he was strongly impressed by the Cologne troubles of 1837, and, as in the case of so many of his contemporaries, they gave a direction to his life, and in 1839, at the age of 21, he established a goal of helping to liberate and revive the Catholic Church in Germany. First of all he gradually abandoned fine-art publications in favour of book-publishing, being thus enabled to devote the full measure of his energies to the service of religious learning. Herein he displayed such activity in the encouragement of particular branches of erudition that the history of his theological publications, for instance, would comprise a considerable fragment of the history of modern theological literature, and the catechetical branch thereof would constitute one of the most important divisions of the history of catechetics. After theology Herder applied himself with the greatest zest to pedagogies, to the lives and learning of the saints as well as to other edifying biographies; also after a long and cautious delay to the publication of sermons. He next took up works dealing with the religious and political problems of the day, with questions of ecclesiastical policy and social controversies and issues. Finally, passing beyond the limits which previously Catholic literature had seldom ventured to transcend, he began the publication of works on the general sciences–history and philosophy, the natural sciences, geography, and ethnology, including the publication of atlases, school textbooks, music, art and its literature, the history of literature, and belles-lettres. His governing purpose throughout was to avoid wasting his energies on particular publications, but to build up the various branches gradually and systematically by the publication of more comprehensive "collections" and "libraries" and by the issue of scientific periodicals.

The Kirchenlexikon (Church Lexicon) was the great centre of his fifty years' activity as a publisher. It was the first comprehensive attempt to treat everything that had any connexion with theology encyclopedically in one work, and also the first attempt to unite all the Catholic savants of Germany, in the production of one great work. Herder had nursed this project since 1840. When its appearance was made possible and its issue was begun in 1847 under the direction of Benedict Welte, exegete of Tübingen, and Heinrich Joseph Wetzer, Orientalist of Freiburg. After sixteen years of struggling and striving on the part of Herder, all obstacles were overcome, and the work was brought to completion in 1856, thanks chiefly to the support of Hefele.

It had a decisive influence on the subsequent intellectual activity of Catholicism. While it was still in process of issue, Protestant scholars made use of Herder's scheme for the Real-Encyklopädie für protestantische Theologie. It was sixteen years more before the preliminary work could be begun on the new edition, and ten years more before its publication could be started.

While the historical element had been especially emphasized in the first edition, the dogmatic and exegetical side was expanded to equal dimensions in the second edition. The subjects to be treated were chosen by Adalbert Weiss, professor at the Freising lyceum, and the editorial chair was held by Joseph Hergenröther until his elevation to the cardinalate, and afterwards by Franz Philip Kaulen, the exegete of Bonn.

The stupendous plan, which Benjamin had cherished since 1841, of building up a "Theologische Bibliothek" (Theological Library) according to an equally logical and symmetrical scheme, he was unable to realize until thirty years later. When the "Kirchenlexikon" was nearing completion, Herder sought, by the publication of the "Konversations-Lexikon" (Universal Encyclopedia, 1st ed., 1853–7), to make the Catholic public independent of the hostile literature which ruled unchallenged in the highly important domain of works of general information. Although, out of regard for the limited purchasing capacity of the Catholic public in Germany, he confined himself to the modest limits of five medium-sized volumes, still the undertaking was for his day a very courageous one. Of the very great number of other works published by him, we can draw attention only to the most notable, which spread the reputation of the house far beyond the limits of Germany. Among the earliest were the works of Alban Stolz, popular theologian and teacher, whose Kalender für Zeit und Ewigkeit achieved an extraordinary success. Alongside Stolz we find Ignaz Schuster, whose catechisms and Biblical histories, went round the world, like Stolz's works, in hundreds of thousands of copies, and up to twenty-five languages.

Even before the completion of the "Kirchenlexikon" Hefele began his monumental "Conciliengeschichte". The strong religious revival that set in with the sixties was heralded by Franz Hettinger's pioneer work, the Apologie des Christentums, which set forth the religious teachings of Christianity to the cultured world in well-timed fashion, and which, reprinted again and again, and constantly improved, continues to exercise a potent influence in five foreign civilized languages even to this day. The "Apologien" of Weiss and Schanz were subsequently issued to support and supplement Hettinger's "Apologie". Of these works the one contrasts Christian life and its historical and cultural development with a purely worldly knowledge and the outlook of the age, while the other strives to harmonize the doctrines of the Church and the results of scientific research.

The Encyclicals of December 1864, and the question of infallibility called forth in the pages of the "Stimmen aus Maria Laach" the comprehensive defence of the authority of the pope, as pastor and teacher, while the controversies concerning the Vatican Council occasioned Hergenröther's masterly "Anti-Janus", afterwards expanded and strengthened in the almost inexhaustible historico-theological essays, the "Katholische Kirche und christlicher Staat in ihrer geschichtlichen Entwicklung und in Beziehung auf Fragen der Gegenwart". The "Stimmen", which at first appeared irregularly, inaugurated those relations between the house of Herder and the German Jesuits which have proved of so great importance to Catholic learning and Catholic life, and have kept the Jesuits in such close touch with their native country even while they were in exile during the persecution of the Kulturkampf. Of the abundant fruits of these relations we may mention the great "Collectio Lacensis" of the more recent councils, which displays a Benedictine industry in the collection of materials, and the "Philosophia Lacensis", nor can we forget the vigorous "Stimmen", which rapidly developed into the organ of the current intellectual movement, and its thoroughly stimulating and very instructive "Ergänzungshefte" (Supplementary Numbers), which already number more than one hundred. After the promulgation of the fundamental decrees of the Vatican Council, the Theologische Bibliothek was opened with Scheeben's Handbuch der Dogmatik.

While the Kulturkampf was threatening to silence the expression of Catholic life, Janssen's Geschichte des deutschen Volkes began its triumphant course, and carried, for the first time, Catholic research into wide Protestant circles. The last ten years of Herder's existence crowned his life-work. Quite apart from the individual volumes of the various Collections and of the Apologies already mentioned, he produced, among other works, the "Real-Encyklopädie der christlichen Alterthümer" by F. X. Kraus, the new edition of the "Kirchenlexikon", Knecht's "Praktischer Kommentar zur biblischen Geschichte", the "Bibliothek für Länder- und Völker-kunde", the "Jahrbuch der Naturwissenschaften", Pastor's "Geschichte der Päpste", the "Staatslexikon der Görres-Gesellschaft", the "Archiv für Literature und Kirchengeschichte des Mittelalters" by Denifle and Franz Ehrle, and the "Bibliothek für katholische Pädagogik".

Thus Benjamin activity as a publisher mirrored the Catholic revival in Germany in the 19th century. He selected the themes for literary treatment. He personally discovered the majority. In no undertaking did he allow material gain to be the deciding factor; even in times of crisis–and of such he encountered more than one, beginning with the Baden uprising of 1848, right through the wars which raged between 1859 and 1871, down to the Kulturkampf which crippled the resources of both clergy and people–the end in view alone determined his decision. Thoroughly alive to his grave responsibility as a publisher, he devoted extraordinary care to the training of capable and conscientious assistants. His partner, Franz Joseph Hutter (b. at Ravensburg, 25 November 1840) issued from the ranks of these "pupils". His essentially practical nature happily complemented Benjamin's idealism, which even repeated warnings had not been able to shake. New branches were established to open a wider market than the older establishments at Freiburg and Strasburg afforded. In 1873 were founded the St. Louis (U. S. A.) branch, under the management of Joseph Gummersbach, and the Munich branch under Herder's brother-in-law, Adolf Streber, and in 1886 that at Vienna, while enterprises of even greater promise were contemplated. In 1863 Herder married Emilie Streber, the accomplished daughter of Franz Seraph Streber, professor at the Ludwig-Maximilians-Universität München, and celebrated as a numismatist. His alliance with the Streber family introduced Herder to a circle of men who played an important part in the Catholic revival in Germany. It was also contemporaneous with a more active movement in the Church. He was handicapped throughout by great physical sufferings.
