= Verlag Herder =

German publisher

- Founded: 1801
- Founder: Bartholomäus Herder
- Country of origin: Germany
- Headquarters location: Freiburg im Breisgau
- Publication types: Books
- Nonfiction topics: Christianity
- Imprints: Crossroad
- Official website: www.herder.de (in German)

Verlag Herder is a publishing company founded in 1801 by the Herders, a German family. The company focuses primarily on Catholic topics of ecclesiology, Christian mysticism, women's studies, and the development of younger Catholic theologians.

== History ==
=== Bartholomäus Herder ===
In 1801 Bartholomäus Herder founded the publishing firm in Meersburg. Among the first publications, which were mainly of a theological and pedagogic character, were Ignaz Heinrich von Wessenberg's "Archiv für pastorale Conferenzen in den Landkapiteln des Bisthums Constanz" (1802–27).

In 1810 the business moved to Freiburg im Breisgau, where, in connection with the university, a more comprehensive character was given to the publications and helped in developing new directions. One of the most important publications was Karl von Rotteck's "Allgemeine Geschichte vom Anfang der historischen Kenntniss bis auf unsere Zeiten" (9 volumes, 1812–27; the 15th edition being issued by another firm). Being entrusted with the publication of the official war bulletin, the "Teutsche Blätter", by the royal and imperial authorities at headquarters as early as the end of 1813, Herder went to Paris with the allied armies in 1815 in Metternich's train as "Director of the Royal and Imperial Field Press".

After the end of the war, Herder founded an art institution for lithography, copperplate engraving, and modeling in terra cotta, in connection with the publishing business. More than three hundred pupils were educated there, while the sumptuous illustrations and maps that were issued mark an epoch in the history of this branch of technic–especially the "Heilige Schriften des Alten und Neuen Testamentes in 200 biblischen Kupfern" (the Holy Writ of the Old and the New Testament in 200 biblical engravings), of which Herder reproduced numerous impressions by an original lithographic process, and Woerl's "Atlas von Central-Europa in 60 Blättern" (Atlas of Central Europe in 60 plates, 1830), which was the earliest employment of two-colour lithography. As late as 1870 this atlas rendered important service to the German army by reason of the map of France it contained. Although such great achievements won a European reputation for the house, the commercial profits derived therefrom were entirely disproportionate to the expenditure. Consequently the condition of the house at Bartholomäus Herder's death in 1839 was by no means a satisfactory one. His two sons succeeded to the heritage.

=== Karl Raphael Herder and Benjamin Herder ===
Karl Raphael Herder (2 November 1816 – 10 June 1865), the older son of Bartholomäus, took up the commercial side of the business, while the younger Benjamin Herder (31 July 1818 – 10 November 1888), took charge of the publishing department until his brother's retirement in 1856, when he undertook the sole management. Equipped with a thorough, scholarly education, trained in the book business by his father and under Gauthier de Laguionie in Paris, Benjamin had had his views further broadened early in life by travels through Germany, Austria, France, England, and Italy.

Benjamin, strongly impressed by the 1837 conflicts between Protestants and Catholics in Cologne, pivoted the publishing business to focus on revitalizing the Catholic Church in Germany. He gradually abandoned fine-art publications in favour of book-publishing, with an emphasis on religious books. These included theological literature, catechetical works, pedagogies, saints' lives, and sermons. He next took up works dealing with the religious and political problems of the day, with questions of ecclesiastical policy and social controversies and issues. Eventually he expanded to works on the general sciences–history and philosophy, the natural sciences, geography, and ethnology, including the publication of atlases, school textbooks, music, art and its literature, the history of literature, and belles-lettres. His governing purpose throughout was to avoid wasting his energies on particular publications, but to build up the various branches gradually and systematically by the publication of more comprehensive "collections" and "libraries" and by the issue of scientific periodicals.

The Kirchenlexikon (Church Lexicon) was the great centre of his fifty years' activity as a publisher. It was the first comprehensive attempt to treat everything that had any connexion with theology encyclopedically in one work, and also the first attempt to unite all the Catholic savants of Germany, in the production of one great work. Herder had nursed this project since 1840. When its appearance was made possible and its issue was begun in 1847 under the direction of Benedict Welte, exegete of Tübingen, and Heinrich Joseph Wetzer, Orientalist of Freiburg. After sixteen years of struggling and striving on the part of Herder, all obstacles were overcome, and the work was brought to completion in 1856, thanks chiefly to the support of Hefele.

It had a decisive influence on the subsequent intellectual activity of Catholicism. While it was still in process of issue, Protestant scholars made use of Herder's scheme for the Real-Encyklopädie für protestantische Theologie. It was sixteen years more before the preliminary work could be begun on the new edition, and ten years more before its publication could be started. While the historical element had been especially emphasized in the first edition, the dogmatic and exegetical side was expanded to equal dimensions in the second edition. The subjects to be treated were chosen by Adalbert Weiss, professor at the Freising lyceum, and the editorial chair was held by Joseph Hergenröther until his elevation to the cardinalate, and afterwards by Franz Philip Kaulen, the exegete of Bonn.

When the "Kirchenlexikon" was nearing completion, Herder began the publication of the "Konversations-Lexikon" (Universal Encyclopedia, 1st ed., 1853-7), a general encyclopedia intended for a Catholic audience. Out of regard for the limited purchasing capacity of the Catholic public in Germany, he confined himself to the modest limits of five medium-sized volumes.

Herder published a great number of other works, some of which became well-known and garnered an international reputation for his publishing house. These included the works of Alban Stolz, popular theologian and teacher, whose Kalender für Zeit und Ewigkeit achieved an extraordinary success. Ignaz Schuster's catechisms and Biblical histories also sold hundreds of thousands of copies in up to twenty-five languages. Herder also published Hefele's "Conciliengeschichte" and Franz Hettinger's Apologie des Christentums, as well as the "Apologien" of Weiss and Schanz.

In 1864, Pope Pius IX published Quanta cura and the Syllabus of Errors, and papal infallibility became a hot topic among Catholics. In response, Herder published in "Stimmen aus Maria Laach" a comprehensive defence of the authority of the pope. On controversies concerning the First Vatican Council, he published Hergenröther's "Anti-Janus", followed by a series of historico-theological essays, the "Katholische Kirche und christlicher Staat in ihrer geschichtlichen Entwicklung und in Beziehung auf Fragen der Gegenwart".

The Stimmen at first appeared irregularly, but developed into a significant phenomenon; its "Ergänzungshefte" (Supplementary Numbers) numbered more than one hundred. These works contributed to a growing relationship between the house of Herder and the German Jesuits, which led to publications such as the "Collectio Lacensis" and the "Philosophia Lacensis".

Since 1841, Herder had planned to build up a "Theologische Bibliothek" (Theological Library), but he did not accomplish this until thirty years later. The Bibliothek opened after the promulgation of the fundamental decrees of the First Vatican Council, with Scheeben's Handbuch der Dogmatik.

In response to the Kulturkampf, Herder published Janssen's Geschichte des deutschen Volkes, which became popular even among Protestants.

Other works published by Herder included:

- Real-Encyklopädie der christlichen Alterthümer (F. X. Kraus),
- Praktischer Kommentar zur biblischen Geschichte (Justus Knecht)
- Bibliothek für Länder- und Völker-kunde (Friedrich von Hellwald)
- Jahrbuch der Naturwissenschaften (Max Wildermann)
- Geschichte der Päpste (Ludwig von Pastor)
- Staatslexikon der Görres-Gesellschaft (Adolf Bruder)
- Archiv für Literature und Kirchengeschichte des Mittelalters (Henry Denifle and Franz Ehrle)
- Bibliothek für katholische Pädagogik (Franz Xaver Kunz)

Herder generally took an active role in publishing, selecting the themes for literary treatment and keeping watch for competent collaborators. The publishing house sometimes faced financial difficulties under his management, including during the Baden uprising of 1848, the wars between 1859 and 1871, and the Kulturkampf. Herder was dedicated to training his assistants, and one of them, Franz Joseph Hutter (b. at Ravensburg, 25 November 1840) later became his partner in the business.

New branches were established to open a wider market than the older establishments at Freiburg and Strasburg afforded. In 1873 were founded the St. Louis (U. S. A.) branch, under the management of Joseph Gummersbach, and the Munich branch under Herder's brother-in-law, Adolf Streber, and in 1886 that at Vienna.

In 1863 Herder married numismatist Emilie Streber, daughter of Franz Seraph Streber. His alliance with the Streber family introduced Herder to a circle of men who played an important part in the Catholic revival in Germany.

=== Hermann Herder ===
Under the management of Hermann Herder, a series of collections, chiefly theological and historical, were issued. Publishing started in foreign languages, principally Spanish and English. In the 21st century, various annuals have been published. These include the "Geschichte der Weltliteratur" of Alexander Baumgartner, the definitive collection of sources for the Tridentine Council, the third, completely revised, edition of the "Konversations-Lexikon", and Joseph Wilpert's work, Fractio Panis, die alteste Darstellung der eucharistischen Opfers (Freiburg in Breisgau) on the catacombs.

The firm established an office in St. Louis, Missouri in 1873, and one in Berlin in 1906.

=== The fourth generation of publishers ===
A few years later, Hermann Herder Sr. died, and in 1937 his grandson Theophil Herder-Dorneich (1898–1987) assumed management of the publishing house, whose work was increasingly obstructed by the National Socialists. In 1939, Karl Alber Verlag was acquired and a Herder branch was established in Manila in the Philippines. In 1943, the company Editorial Herder was founded in Barcelona, Spain, with part of the Spanish–Latin branch of the publishing house. On November 27, 1944, the Freiburg publishing house was destroyed by a bombing raid during the British Operation Tigerfish. Among the victims were 11 Herder employees. When Major Theophil Herder-Dorneich returned from the war in 1945, Freiburg was under French occupation. Of the employees, 45 had been killed in the war and 11 were missing. One year later, the monthly journal Herder Korrespondenz appeared for the first time. In the following years, Hermann Herder-Dorneich proved to be just as fond of travel as his grandfather and continued to advance the internationalization of the Herder Group.

=== The fifth generation of publishers ===
In 1960, Theophil's son Hermann Alphons married Hortens' daughter Mechtild. On his father's 65th birthday, he was entrusted with the management of the publishing house. His brother, the social economist Philipp Herder-Dorneich, also served as managing director from 1963 until 1973, when he accepted a position at the University of Cologne. Until his death in 1987, Theophil Herder-Dorneich remained the senior head of the publishing house. During this period, the publishing group was gradually expanded, with the acquisition of A.G. Ploetz Verlag and F.H. Kerle Verlag in the 1970s. In 1984, the Carolus bookstore in Frankfurt opened its doors for the first time. In 1989, under Hermann Herder, a decision was made to restructure and modernize the publishing group: distribution was soon handled by the external service provider Koch, Neff und Oetinger; the printing plant, which had grown too large, was relocated to Freiburg-Hochdorf; and the entire north wing of the Red House was sold to the State of Baden-Württemberg, which has since housed the Faculty of Forestry of the University of Freiburg there. The substantial investments that followed led, after legal disputes, to the withdrawal of all of Hermann Herder's siblings from the publishing group in 1997, at a time when the company was also facing serious economic difficulties. Cost reductions, staff cuts, and the group's withdrawal from the bookstore business characterized this phase. For example, the Herder bookstore in Freiburg's city center has belonged to the Thalia bookstore chain since the 1990s. The rationalization measures also affected the Vienna branch, so that in 1997 the Vienna publishing production was transferred back to the Freiburg headquarters.

=== The sixth generation of publishers ===
In 2000, Hermann Herder split the group and divided management among his three children: Manuel Herder (*1966) took over management in Freiburg, Gwendolin Herder in New York City, and Raimund Herder responsibility for the Barcelona division. In 2001, Verlag Herder celebrated its 200th anniversary.

On April 1, 2004, the Vienna site founded in 1886—since 1997 operating solely as a bookstore—was taken over by its previous managing director Gerhard Zach and has since been run as Zach-Buch GmbH, under the name Buchhandlung Herder and within a cooperation agreement with the former headquarters, as of June 23, 2004. In October 2006, the publishing house acquired the Dornier Publishing Group (Stuttgart), including the Kreuz, Lüchow, Theseus, and Urania imprints. Effective January 1, 2009, Kreuz Verlag sold the Theseus and Lüchow imprints to the J. Kamphausen Publishing Group in Bielefeld, as well as the Christophorus craft publishing house to OZ Verlag. In 2012, Herder relocated the Herder Children's Books and KeRLE labels to a new location in Munich. In October 2013, Herder announced that it would also move the general nonfiction program segments to Munich.

The Freiburger Graphische Betriebe (FGB), whose principal shareholder as recently as 2012 was publisher Manuel Herder and which were therefore often counted as part of the Herder Group, were sold in June 2014 to the Belgian printing company Proost Industries. In spring 2015, insolvency proceedings were initiated, as a result of which the company was liquidated.

==== Herder–Thalia bookstore in Freiburg ====
The Herder bookstores in Freiburg's city center and in Münster were sold in 1996 to the Phönix-Montanus Group (now the Thalia-Douglas Group); the Herder bookstore in Vienna was sold in 2004 to its former managing director. The large Carolus bookstore in Frankfurt am Main was closed in 2019. In July 2016, it was announced that Herder had acquired a majority stake in the Thalia bookselling group. This marked a reversal of earlier ownership structures, as Herder—having previously sold its own bookstores—became the majority shareholder of one of Germany's largest book retail groups.

== Current operations ==
In the 1990s, the American imprint of Herder & Herder was brought back under the international Herder publishing family. Gwendolin Herder became the CEO of The Crossroad Publishing Company, based in New York. Manuel Herder was in charge of operations in Freiburg, Germany, and Raimund Herder led the office in Barcelona, Spain.
