= Johann Sebastian von Drey =

German Catholic professor of theology

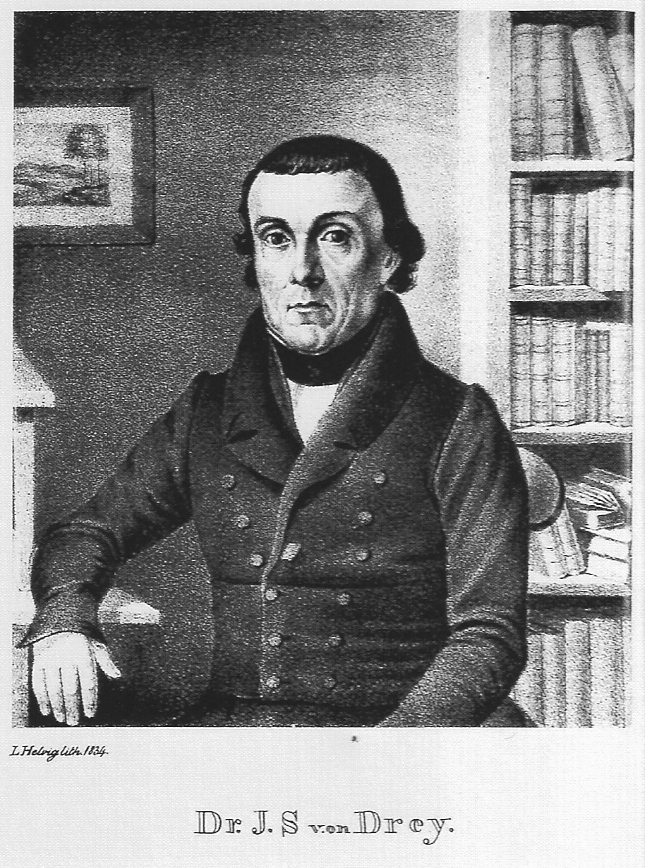
Dr. J. S. von Drey (lithography by Ludwig August Helvig, 1834)

Johann Sebastian von Drey (16 October 1777 – 19 February 1853) was a German Catholic professor of theology at the University of Tübingen. With Johann Adam Möhler, Drey was a founder of the Catholic Tübingen school.

== Life ==
He was born in the parish of Röhlingen, in the then ecclesiastical principality of Ellwangen. The parish priest of Röhlingen, an ex-Jesuit, noting the boy's talents, instructed him in the elements of Latin, and persuaded his parents to send him, in 1787, in spite of their extreme poverty, to the gymnasium of Ellwangen. There he lived partly on the charity of the townspeople and partly by tutoring, especially in Latin, mathematics, and physics.

He studied theology, 1797–1799, at Augsburg; after 1799 he lived in the diocesan seminary at Pfaffenhausen. He was ordained in the summer of 1801. During his five years as assistant in his native place, Drey studied the then paramount philosophy of Kant, Fichte, and Schelling, as appears clearly in his works. His position, from 1806, as professor of philosophy of religion, mathematics, and physics in the Catholic academy of Rottweil, formed a good preparation for his subsequent academical career.

When in 1812 King Frederick I of Württemberg founded the University of Ellwangen as a Catholic national university for his recently acquired Catholic territory, Drey was called to lecture there on dogmatics, history of dogma, apologetics, and introduction to theology. There he published two Latin dissertations: "Observata quædam ad illustrandam Justini M. de regno millenario sententiam" (1814), and "Dissertatio historico-theologica originem et vicissitudinem exomologeseos in ecclesiâ. catholicâ ex documentis ecclesiasticis illustrans" (1815), the latter of which was denounced to Rome, but without serious consequences for its author, at least for the time being.

When King William I (1817) incorporated the University of Ellwangen with the old national University of Tübingen as its Catholic faculty of theology, Drey with his colleagues, Peter Aloys Gratz and Johann Georg Herbst, joined the staff of the new school. He co-founded (1819), together with Gratz and his new colleague, Johann Baptist von Hirscher, the "Theologische Quartalschrift" of Tübingen; he took a prominent part in its publication and wrote for it a number of essays and reviews. In the same year he published: "Kurze Einleitung in das Studium der Theologie mit Rücksicht auf den wissenschaftlichen Standpunkt und das katholische System".

An effort to make Drey first bishop of the newly founded diocese of Rottenburg failed, among other reasons because of the distrust with which he was regarded in Rome owing to his above-named work on confession. Somewhat as a recompense the first position at the cathedral was reserved for him, which however, he never filled. After convalescing from a severe illness, he was relieved from his office as teacher of dogmatic theology (1838). Still comparatively robust, though well advanced in years, Drey was pensioned in 1846, almost against his will; he continued, however, to write for Wetzer and Welte's Kirchenlexikon and for the "Theologische Quartalschrift" of Tübingen.

== Works ==
In 1832 appeared his "Neue Untersuchungen über die Konstitutionen und Kanones der Apostel", later updated by von Funk. Just then his principal work, in three volumes, appeared: "Die Apologetik als wissenschaftliche Nachweisung der Göttlichkeit des Christentums in seiner Erscheinung" (1838–1847).

Like Möhler, Hefele, and von Funk, he was a critical historian. But Drey also gave to the systematic theology of this school its stamp, equi-distinct from Traditionalism and Rationalism, recognizing on the one hand the objective facts in the history of Revelation and the tradition from generation to generation, maintaining on the other the rights of natural reason and of philosophical speculation, with all due loyalty to dogma. Johannes von Kuhn and Schanz followed in the path marked out by Drey.

== Books ==
Drey's publications include;

- Mein Tagebuch über philosophische, theologische und historische Gegenstände, 1812–1817
- Introduction to the Study of Theology (Einleitung in das Studium der Theologie, Tubing. 1819)
- Researches on the Apostolical Constitutions and Canons (Untersuchungen fiber die Constitutionen und Canones der Apostel, Tübingen, 1832)
- Apologetics (Christliche Apologetik, Mainz, 1838–47, 3 volumes)
- Die Apologetik als wissenschaftlichen Nachweisung der Göttlichkeit des Christenthums in seiner Erscheinung (1844)

== See also ==
- Giovanni Perrone
