= Daniel Bonifacius von Haneberg =

German Catholic bishop and orientalist

Daniel Bonifacius von Haneberg O.S.B.
- Bishop of Speyer
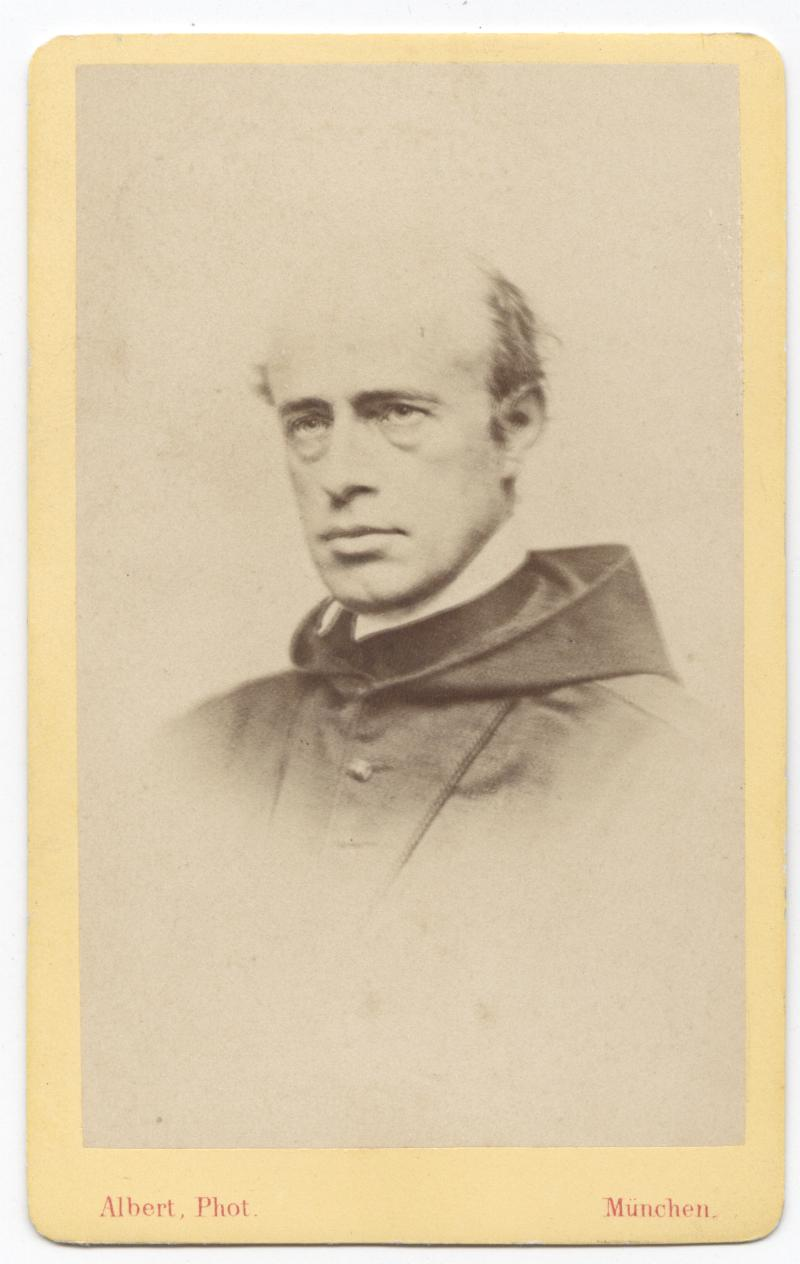
- Daniel Bonifacius von Haneberg (1870)
- Native name: Daniel Bonifaz von Haneberg
- Church: Catholic Church
- Diocese: Diocese of Speyer
- In office: 29 July 1872 – 31 May 1876
- Predecessor: Konrad Reither
- Successor: Joseph Georg von Ehrler

Orders
- Ordination: 29 August 1839
- Consecration: 25 August 1872 by Gregor von Scherr

Personal details
- Born: 16 June 1816 Tannen (in present-day Kempten), Kingdom of Bavaria, German Confederation
- Died: 31 May 1876 (aged 59) Speyer, Kingdom of Bavaria, German Empire

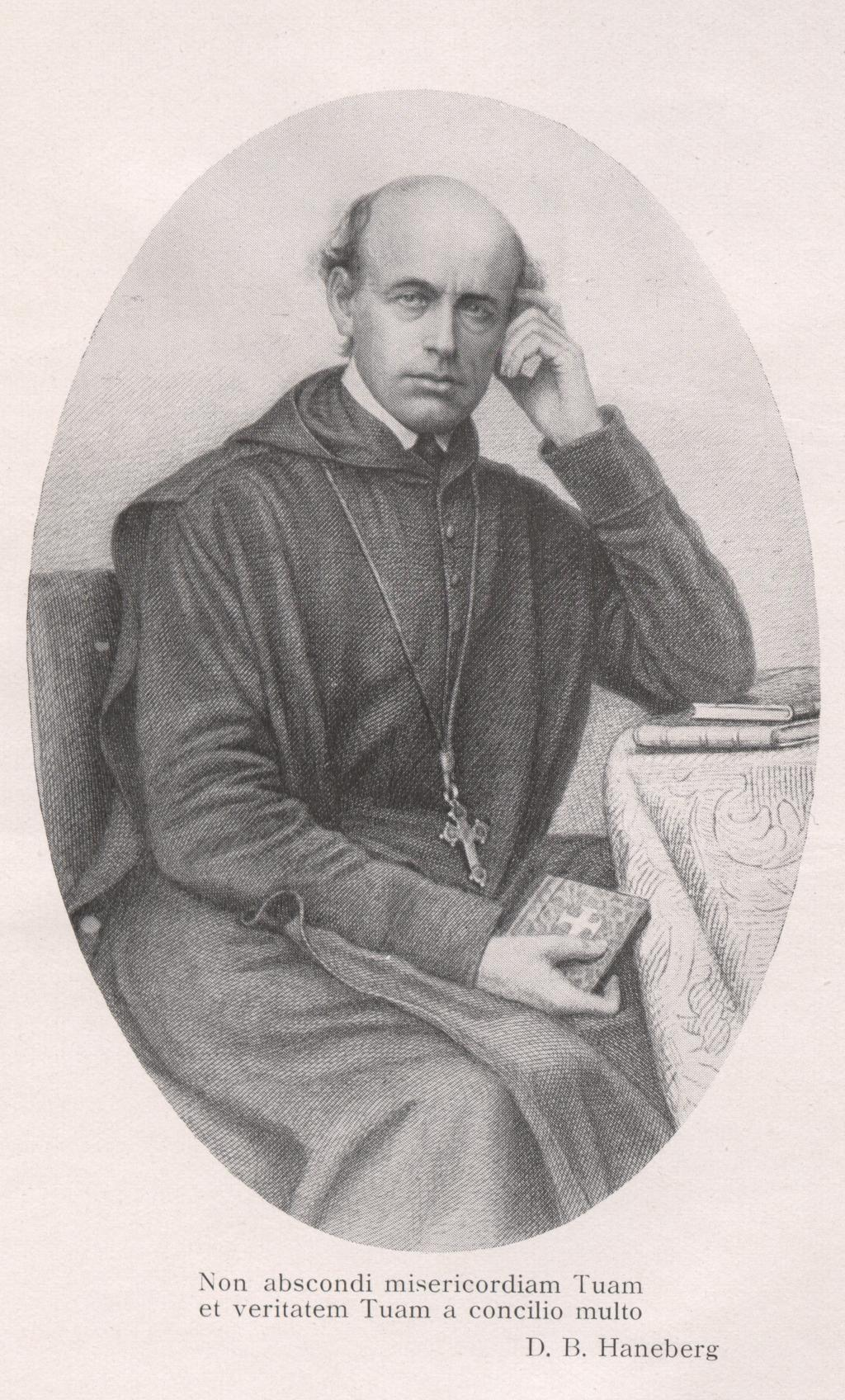
Daniel Bonifacius von Haneberg (1860)

Daniel Bonifacius von Haneberg (16 June 1816 in Tanne near Kempten – 31 May 1876 in Speyer) was a German Catholic bishop and orientalist.

== Early studies and career ==
He began his classical course at Kempten, where he pursued the studies prescribed by the curriculum, and mastered several Semitic languages (Hebrew, Arabic, Syriac, Persian, and Ethiopic). He then went to Munich, where he completed his elementary studies at a Gymnasium, and followed courses of philosophy and theology at the Ludwig-Maximilians-Universität München (LMU).

While a theological student, he cultivated Sanskrit and Chinese over and above the Semitic languages with which he was already acquainted, translated a few works of Cardinal Wiseman, contributed several essays and poems to various German periodicals, and prepared for the Catholic priesthood. He took his degree of Doctor of Theology at LMU in 1839, and was ordained priest at Augsburg, on 29 August of the same year.

The following November, he qualified for a Privatdozent at LMU with his thesis "De significationibus in Veteri Testamento præter literam valentibus" (Munich, 1839), and began in December his career of thirty-three years as a lecturer of the Old Testament. In 1841, he became extraordinary professor of Hebrew and of Holy Scripture in the same university, and in 1844 ordinary professor. His lectures, wherein he displayed a solid learning, a constant discretion, and a deep piety, were attended with great profit and delight by an increasing number of students not only from Bavaria, but also from the other German States, and soon caused him to be regarded as one of the most prominent Catholic professors of his day.

He carried out the duties of his priestly calling, such as preaching, attendance at the confessional, answers to sick-calls, etc. His learning and still more his virtues, secured for him great favor at the Bavarian court, and he acted as tutor in the families of the Duke Maxmilian and Prince Leopold.

In 1850, he joined the Order of St. Benedict, and a few years afterwards (1854) was chosen abbot of the Benedictine monastery of St. Boniface at Munich. He soon founded the Reform School at Andechs in Upper Bavaria, and a little he tried, but with small success, to establish missions of his order in Algiers and in the Orient.

== As bishop ==
At the approach of the Vatican Council he was invited by Pope Pius IX to share in the labours preparatory to that assembly. After the dogma of papal infallibility had been solemnly proclaimed by the Council (18 July 1870), and publicly accepted by the German Bishops assembled at Fulda, (end of August 1870), Hanneberg recanted his previous views on the topic.

From 1864 onwards, several episcopal sees had been offered him, but he had declined them all. At length, however, on his presentation by the King of Bavaria for the Bishopric of Spires and at the instance of the Sovereign Pontiff, the humble abbot accepted that see, and was consecrated 25 August 1872. His zeal and success in the government of this diocese fully justified his selection for the episcopal dignity. In days of opposition to Catholicism in Germany — the days of the framing and application of the Falk Laws (1872-1875) — he fought against the encroachments of the civil power on the ecclesiastical jurisdiction. He also strenuously, though not always successfully, combated the influence of the Old Catholics of the time. He was most unsparing of himself in his confirmation tours, although the bodily fatigues thus entailed were far too much for his failing strength. After a few days of sickness he succumbed (31 May 1876) to pneumonia, which he had contracted in one of those episcopal tours, and was lamented by both clergy and people who revered him as a saint.

== Works ==
During the years 1840 and 1841, Haneberg worked on his Die religiösen Alterthümer der Hebrüer, and in 1844 he published his Einleitung in das Alte Testament as a textbook for his lectures. In the course of time, he recast both these works, the former of which passed to the second edition in 1869 under the title of Die religiösen Alterthümer der Bibel, and the latter of which appeared rewritten as Geschichte der biblischen Offenbarung, and was rendered into French by Isadore Goschler (Paris, 1856), reaching a fourth edition in 1876.

Besides these, his best-known works, he published several others which were chiefly the fruit of his Hebrew and Arabic studies, and formed his contribution to the Journal of the Oriental Society and to the transactions of the Bavarian Academy of Sciences of which he became a member in 1848. Among these latter works the following may be mentioned:

- Ueber die arabische Psalmenübersetzung des Saadia
- Uber das Schulwesen der Mohammedaner
- Erörerungen über Bendo-Wakidi's Geschichte der Eroberung von Syrien"
- Ueber die Theologie des Aristotles
- Canones S. Hippolyti arabice e codicibus romanis cum versione latinâ, annotationibus, et prolegomenis

He found time also for contributing articles to the Kirchenlexicon of Heinrich Joseph Wetzer and Benedict Welte.
