= Herder (disambiguation) =

A herder is a worker who cares for domestic animals, in places where these animals wander pasture lands.

Herder may also refer to:

== People ==
- Herder (surname)
- Herder Vázquez (born 1967), Colombian long-distance runner

== Other uses ==
- Bot herder
- Herder, Alberta, Canada
- Herder Prize, named after J.G. Herder
- Herder Memorial Trophy, awarded annually to the senior ice hockey champions of Newfoundland and Labrador, Canada
- Verlag Herder, German publishing house

== See also ==
- Herd (disambiguation)
- Herding
- Hearder, a surname
