= Herder (surname) =

Herder is a German surname. Notable people with the surname include:

- Andrzej Herder (1937–2002), Polish actor
- August von Herder (1776–1838), German mineralogist and geologist
- Bartholomäus Herder (1774–1839), German publisher, founder of Verlag Herder
- Benjamin Herder (1818–1888), German publisher, son of Bartholomäus
- Johann Gottfried Herder (1744–1803), German literary scholar and philosopher after whom the Herder Prize is named
- Karl Raphael Herder (1816–1865), German publisher, son of Bartholomäus
- Karoline Herder (1750–1809), German biographer of Johann Gottfried Herder
- William James Herder (1849–1922), Newfoundlander newspaper publisher

== See also ==
- Hearder, another surname
