= Welte =

Welte may refer to:

== People ==
- Benedict Welte, a German Catholic exegete
- Gottlieb Welté, an etcher and landscape painter from Mainz, Germany
- Harald Welte, a programmer resident in Berlin, Germany

== Other uses ==
- Welte-Mignon, a manufacturer of orchestrions, organs and reproducing pianos
- Wetzer-Welte Kirchenlexikon, an encyclopedic work of Catholic biography, history, and theology
