= Hermann Streber =

German Roman Catholic priest and writer

Hermann Streber (b. at Munich, 27 September 1839; d. at Tölz, 9 August 1896) was a German Roman Catholic priest and writer, particularly associated with the second edition of the Kirchenlexikon.

== Life ==
His father was Franz Seraph Streber. He entered the Ludwigsgymnasium in 1850, but a nervous fever prevented him from qualifying for the university through the usual final school examination. From this ailment he never completely recovered.

Entering the university by a private examination in 1858, he devoted over two years to the study of philosophy and theology, attending besides historical lectures. During this period he compiled a description and catalogue of the ancient coins in the Royal Cabinet of Medals. In 1861 he entered the archiepiscopal seminary at Freising, and in 1864 was ordained priest.

After the death of his father he was unable to pursue his original intention of studying numismatics. In 1867 he was appointed religious teacher at the Wilhelmsgymnasium. Having received six months' leave of absence in 1868, he won the doctorate in theology in Rome (January, 1869). While being in Rome he lived in the priest college Santa Maria dell' Anima. He then resumed his duties as religious teacher until June, 1870, when he was dismissed for alleged "intriguing in favour of the dogma of infallibility".

He was then named pastor of Wolfersdorf, near Freising. Invited by Joseph Hergenröther to assist him in editing the new edition of the Kirchenlexikon, Streber resigned his parish, and settled in Würzburg. When Hergenröther was summoned as cardinal to Rome, Streber moved to Bonn to be near Kaulen, the new editor, and worked on the "Nomenclator". He wrote many articles for the Kirchenlexikon, the direction of which was for a time entirely in his hands.

In 1892 illness forced him to withdraw to his brother's house at Tölz, where he lived in retirement until death.
