= Peter Aloys Gratz =

German schoolmaster and Biblical scholar

Peter Aloys Gratz (17 August 1769, Oy-Mittelberg – 1 November 1849) was a German schoolmaster and widely published Biblical scholar, who contributed to debates within Catholicism in the early nineteenth century.

He was born in Mittelberg, Allgäu, Bavaria, and received his elementary training in the monastic school in Füssen. He studied classics in Augsburg, and in 1788 entered the clerical seminary in Dillingen, to take up the study of philosophy and theology. After his ordination to the priesthood, in 1792, he held the office of private tutor, and in 1796 was placed in charge of the parish church of Unterthalheim, near Horb, on the Neckar. As well as his parochial duties he found time to prepare several textbooks and other small works on Christian instruction, for use in elementary schools. He also entered the field of New Testament exegesis. In 1812 he published Neuer Versuch, die Entstehung der drei ersten Evangelien zu erklären (Stuttgart, 1812), in which he adopted the hypothesis of a Hebrew original as the basis of one of the Synoptic Gospels. This work attracted the attention of scholars, and won for him on 28 September of the same year the chairs of Greek language and Biblical hermeneutics in the University of Ellwangen. Recognizing his abilities, the University of Freiburg, in 1813, conferred on him the doctorate in theology.

He died at Darmstadt in 1849.

== Career and publications ==
During his professoriate in Ellwangen Gratz published: (1) Kritische Untersuchungen über Justins apostolische Denkwürdigkeiten (Stuttgart, 1814); (2) Über die Interpolationen in dem Briefe des Apostels Paulus an die Römer (Ellwangen, 1814); (3) Über die Grenzen der Freiheit, die einem Katholiken in der Erklärung der Schrift zusteht (Ellwangen, 1817); (4) Dissertatio in Pastorem Hermæ, in Constanzer Archiv, 1817, II, 224 sqq. On the amalgamation of the University of Ellwangen with that of Tübingen, in 1817, he accompanied the theological faculty there, and continued his lectures on hermeneutics. Here he published his Kritische Untersuchungen uber Marcions Evangelium (Tübingen, 1818), and with the cooperation of his friends Johann Sebastian Drey, Johann Georg Herbst, and J. B. Hirscher, founded in 1819 the Tübingen Theologische Quartalschrift.

The same year he received an invitation to the chair of Sacred Scripture in the newly erected faculty of theology in the University of Bonn. This, however, was of short duration. The university, though now devoid of the Rationalism and Febronianism which characterized the first period of its existence, was gradually undergoing the influence of a new movement known as Hermesianism, the originator of which was George Hermes, professor of theology and a close friend of Gratz. The high reputation of Hermes, the popular character of his lectures, as well as the fact that they were devoted to the examination of the philosophical systems of Kant and Fichte, induced Gratz to sympathize with his distinguished friend and associate himself with the new movement. However, the Catholic Encyclopedia states that he came to regret this.

He continued to lecture at Bonn till 1823. He remained a member of its theological faculty till 1826, and in 1828 was called to Trier, there to become a member of the municipal council and also of the school board. He devoted all his time and energy to the reorganization of the studies, and to placing the schools generally on a higher scale of efficiency than they had hitherto attained. While in Bonn he published: (1) Apologet des Katholicismus, Zeitschrift für Freunde der Wahrheit und der Bruderliebe (Mainz, 1820–24, 9 fasc.); (2) Novum Testamentum græco-latinum (Tübingen, 1820; Mainz, 1827); and (3) Kritischer Commentar über das Evangelium des Matthäus (Critical commentary on the Gospel of Matthew; Tübingen, 1821–23). This commentary, owing to the extensive use the author made of Protestant works, was severely attacked by Anton Joseph Binterim and Joseph Görres. Gratz replied in the sixth fascicle of his Apologeten, while his friends published in his defence Drei öffentliche Stimmen gegen die Angriffe des Pastors Binterim auf den Commentar des Professors Gratz, nebst drei Beilagen (Bonn, 1825). He also undertook the continuation of the Thesaurus juris ecclesiastici of the Jesuit Aug. Schmidt, which, however, remained unfinished when he died.
