= Johann Georg Herbst =

German Orientalist

Johann Georg Herbst (13 January 1787 – 31 July 1836) was a German Orientalist.

== Biography ==
Herbst was born in Rottweil in the Duchy of Württemberg. His college course, begun in the Gymnasium of his native city, was pursued in the Benedictine monastery of St. Peter in the Black Forest and in 1806 Herbst registered at the University of Freiburg. After some time spent in completing his mathematical and philosophical studies, he devoted his talents to mastering Semitic languages and Biblical science under the tutorship of Johann Leonard Hug.

From the university Herbst went, in 1811, to the seminary of Meersburg, to prepare himself for Holy Orders, and was ordained to the priesthood in March, 1812. Called at once to the seminary of Ellwangen to discharge the office of repentant, he at the same time accepted the chair of Hebrew and Arabic at the newly erected University of Ellwangen, and, two years later, was promoted to the professorship of Semitic languages and Old Testament exegesis.

In 1817, the theological faculty of Ellwangen was transferred to Tübingen, and there, in addition to the courses already entrusted to him, Herbst taught introduction to the Holy Scriptures and Biblical archæology; he also occasionally was prevailed upon to lecture on New Testament exegesis, church history, and pastoral theology. His colleagues there included Johann Sebastian von Drey, Johann Baptist von Hirscher, and Johann Adam Möhler; Karl Joseph von Hefele studied at the institution during Herbst's time there.

Herbst's first publication was a volume entitled: Observationes quædam de Pentateuchi quatuor librorum posteriorum auctore et editore (Gmünd, 1817). From the foundation, in 1819, of the Tübingen Theol. Quartalschrift, he was a steady contributor thereto; but his principal work, left unfinished, is an introduction to the Old Testament, which was completed and edited by his pupil Benedict Welte (1841–44). In 1832, Herbst was appointed head librarian of the Royal University; but perhaps through overwork his health soon failed, and he died in Tübingen after a short sickness.
