= Franz Ignaz von Streber =

German numismatist and theologian

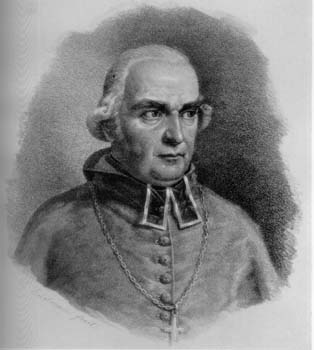
Franz Ignaz von Streber

Franz Ignaz von Streber (11 February 1758 – 26 April 1841) was a German numismatist and theologian from Reisbach, Lower Bavaria.

== Biography ==
In 1770, Strever went to the Kolleg der Bartholomäer in Ingolstadt where he began to study Philosophy and Theology, earning the titles Master of Philosophy (1776) and Master of Theology (1779). In 1780 he was appointed private secretary to Johann Goswin von Widder (1734–1800) in Munich, remaining there for ten years. In 1783 he was made court chaplain, in 1803 director of the court chapel, in 1821 auxiliary bishop, in 1822 cathedral provost of Munich and Freising. In 1782 he was appointed curator of the cabinet of coins of the elector, as assistant to the diplomat Johann Casimir Häffelin. Supported by Häffelin and his successors, in 1785 he was appointed director of the numismatic collection.

His nephew, Franz Seraph Streber, followed him into the same field. Streber died in Munich.

== Numismatic work ==
His work was to unite the Mannheim or the Palatinate collection with the Munich or Bavarian collection of the Wittelsbach line, which had been in disorder since the Thirty Years' War, and to arrange the combined collection in scientific order. On account of the disturbances caused by war he was obliged to carry off and conceal the cabinet of coins five times, each time re-arranging it anew. He wrote a history of the royal Bavarian cabinet of coins, and several treatises on Bavarian and Greek numismatics, most of which appeared in the transactions of the Academy of Fine Arts Munich, of which institution he became a member in 1822.
