= Hermann Rolfus =

Hermann Rolfus (24 May 1821 at Freiburg – 27 October 1896 at Bühl, near Offenburg) was a German Roman Catholic priest and educator.

== Life ==
After attending the gymnasium at Freiburg, he studied theology and philology at the university there from 1840 to 1843, and was ordained priest on 31 August 1844. After he had served for brief periods at various places, he was appointed curate at Thiengen in 1851, curate-in-charge at Reiselfingen in 1855, parish priest at the last named place in 1861, parish priest at Reuthe near Freiburg in 1867 at Sasbach in 1875, and at Buhl in 1892. In 1867 the theological faculty at Freiburg gave him the degree of Doctor of Theology.

== Works ==
Rolfus contributed to practical Catholic pedagogics by the work which he edited in conjunction with Adolf Pfister, Real-Encyclopädie des Erziehungsund Unterrichtswesens nach katholischen Principien (4 vols., Mainz, 1863–1866; 2nd. ed. 1872-74). A fifth volume (Ergänzungsband, 1884) was issued by Rolfus alone.

Another influential publication was the Suddeutsches katholisches Schulwochenblatt, which he edited, also jointly with Pfister, from 1861 to 1867. Among other works were:

- Der Grund des katholischen Glaubens (Mainz, 1862);
- Leitfaden der allgemeinen Weltgeschichte (Freiburg, 1870; 4th ed., 1896);
- Die Glaubens- und Sittenlehre der katholischen Kirche (Einsiedeln, 1875; frequently re-edited), jointly with F. J. Brändle;
- Kirchengeschichtliches in chronologischer Reihenfolge von der Zeit des letzten Vaticanischen Concils bis auf unsere Tage (2 vols., Mainz, 1877–82; 3rd vol. by Sickinger, 1882);
- Geschichte des Reiches Gottes auf Erden (Freiburg, 1878–80; 3rd. ed., 1894–95);
- Katholischer Hauskatechismus (Emsiedeln, 1891–92).

In addition, he wrote a large number of pedagogic, political, apologetic, and polemical brochures, ascetic treatises, and works for the young.
