= Adolf Pfister =

German Roman Catholic priest and educator

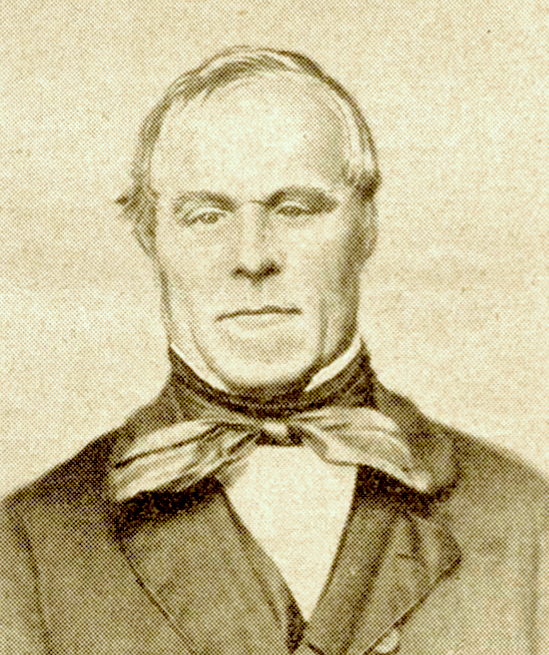
Adolf Pfister (1810-1878)

Adolf Pfister (born at Hechingen in Hohenzollern, 26 September 1810; died at Ober-Dischingen in Württemberg, 29 April 1878) was a German Roman Catholic priest and educator.

== Life ==
He was educated at the Latin school at Hechingen, at the Lyceum of Rastatt, and later at Sasbach. He then studied theology at the Grand Seminary of Strasburg, and was ordained to the priesthood, 25 May 1833, at Freiburg.

After serving for five months as curate at Sasbach, and for a year as assistant at Freiburg Cathedral, he returned to Hohenzollern, and, from 1835 to 1838, was curate at Steinhofen near Hechingen. In 1838 he obtained civic rights in Württemberg, and as a priest of the Diocese of Rottenburg, he was pastor first in Dotternhausen; 31 January 1839, at Rosswangen; 11 May 1841, at Rißtissen; from 1851 also school inspector in Ehingen.

On 12 August 1867, the Catholic theological faculty of the University of Tübingen granted him the degree of Doctor of Theology. In May, 1877, he retired to Ober-Dischingen.

== Works ==
In 1857 he founded the "Rottenburger Kirchenblatt", which he published for three years. From 1860 he edited the "Katholisches Schulwochenblatt" (Spaichingen), which, together with Hermann Rolfus, he continued as "Süddeutsches katholisches Schulwochenblatt" (1861–67), and with J. Haug and J. Knecht as "Magazin für Pädagogik" (1868–72).

His major work was the editing with Rolfus of the "Real-Encyclopädie des Erziehungs- und Unterrichtswesens nach katholischen Principien" (4 vols., Mainz, 1863–66; 2nd ed., 1872–1874; a 5th vol., "Ergänzungsband", was published by Rolfus alone in 1884 after Pfister's death). Among Pfister's other writings were:

- "Unterricht uber das Werk der Glaubensverbreitung" (Freiburg, 1850);
- a German translation of Thomas à Kempis, "Vier Bücher von der Nachfolge Christi" (Freiburg, 1860; 4th ed., 1873) and "Kinderlegende" (Freiburg, 1863);

He also compiled several prayer-books.
