= Karl Raphael Herder =

Karl Raphael Herder (2 November 1816 – 10 June 1865) was the older son of Bartholomäus Herder. Karl ran the commercial side of the Verlag Herder business, while his younger brother, Benjamin Herder, took charge of the publishing department. Karl retired in 1856. His brother assumed total control of the company.
