= Aloys Pichler =

German librarian, Roman Catholic priest, theologian

The Reverend Aloys Pichler
- Born: 7 November 1833; Burgkirchen am Wald
- Died: 3 June 1874 (aged 40); Siegsdorf
- Occupations: librarian, Roman Catholic priest

Aloys Pichler (1833–1874) was a German librarian and Roman Catholic priest and theologian.

== Early life and education ==
He was born in 1833 at Burgkirchen am Wald in the Roman Catholic Diocese of Passau. He studied at the Passau Lyceum and at Munich, and in 1857 he received the prize for an essay on Polybius. Two years later he was made a priest; in 1861 he was honored with the theological doctorate, and in the following year he commenced his lectures on Church history.

== Career and downfall ==
In 1869 he was appointed librarian at St. Petersburg; but two years later he was found to be guilty of kleptomaniac propensities in his official capacity, and as he had robbed the library of many valuable possessions, he was brought to trial, found guilty, and condemned to banishment to Siberia, where he remained till 1874, when he was pardoned through the intervention of the Bavarian prince Leopold. Pichler then returned to his native country. He died on 3 June 1874 in Siegdorf, near Trauenstein.

== Works ==
He wrote, Geschichte des Protestantisnus in der orientalischen Kirche im 17 Jahrhund., oder der Patriarch Cyrillus Lucaris u. seine Zeit (Munich, 1861): — Die orientalische Kitchenfrage nach ihrem gegenwartigen Stande (ibid. 1861): — Geschichte der kirchlichen Trennung zwischen Orient und Occident (1864–65, 2 volumes); which had the distinction of being placed on the Romish Index — Die Theologie des Leibnitz (1869 sq., 2 volumes): — Die wahren Hindernisse und die Grundbedingungen einer durchgreifenden Reform der Kirche (1870). Towards the last he became more estranged from his Church. See Ztchhold, Bibliotheca Theologica. 2:995; Literarischer Hardweiser furs katholische Deutschland, 1874, page 335 sq.; Kurtz, Lehrbuch der Kircherngesch. 7th ed., 2:357. (B.P.)
