= Joseph Hergenröther =

German Church historian and canonist (1824–1890)

His Eminence Joseph Hergenröther
- Archivist of the Vatican Secret Archives
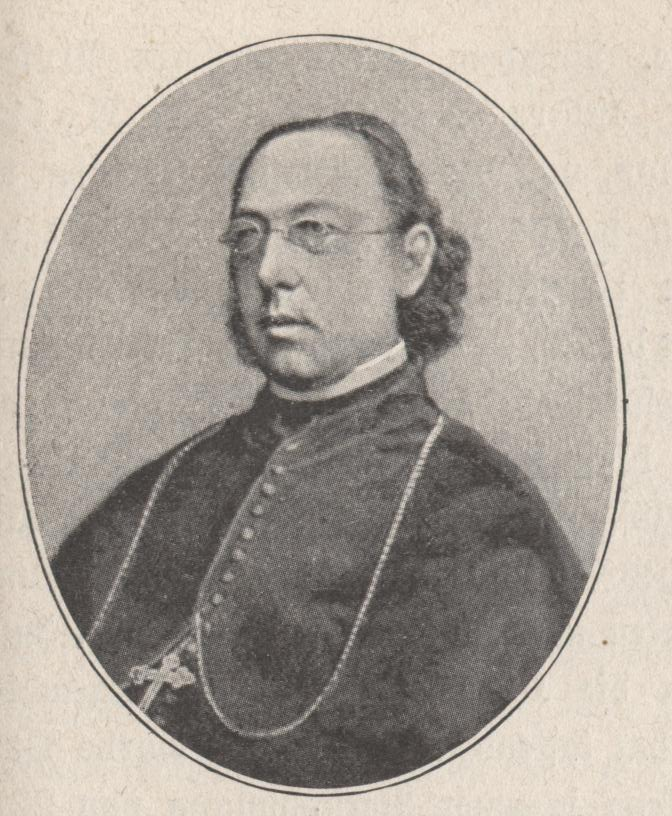
- Church: Roman Catholic Church
- Appointed: 9 June 1879
- Term ended: 3 October 1890
- Predecessor: Jean Baptiste François Pitra
- Successor: Luigi Tripepi
- Other posts: Prefect of the Vatican Secret Archives (1879–90); Cardinal-Deacon of Santa Maria in Via Lata (1888–90); Protodeacon (1890)
- Previous post: Cardinal-Deacon of San Nicola in Carcere (1879–88)

Orders
- Ordination: 28 March 1848 by George Anton von Stahl
- Created cardinal: 12 May 1879 by Pope Leo XIII
- Rank: Cardinal-Deacon

Personal details
- Born: Joseph Hergenröther; 15 September 1824 Würzburg, German Confederation
- Died: 3 October 1890 (aged 66) Bregenz, Austria-Hungary
- Parents: Johann Jacob Hergenröther; Eva Maria Horsch
- Education: University of Würzburg; Ludwig-Maximilians-Universität München

Joseph Hergenröther (15 September 1824 – 3 October 1890) was a German Church historian and canonist, and the first Cardinal-Prefect of the Vatican Archive.

== Biography ==
Born in Würzburg, he was the second son of Johann Jacob Hergenröther, professor of medicine in the University of Würzburg. In 1842, Hergenröther completed with notable success his gymnasium course in his native town, and entered the University of Würzburg to take up a two-year course of philosophical studies, to which he added certain branches of theology. His historical tendencies exhibited themselves at this early age in a dramatic poem entitled Papst Gregor VII (Würzburg, 1841).

Bishop von Stahl took an interest in him, and in 1844 sent him to the Collegium Germanicum et Hungaricum in Rome, whither he had already sent Heinrich Joseph Dominicus Denzinger and Franz Hettinger. Among his scholarly teachers were Giovanni Perrone and Carlo Passaglia in doctrinal theology, Tomei in moral theology, Antonio Ballerini in church history, Francis Xavier Patrizi in Scriptural exegesis, and Marzio in canon law.

The political troubles of 1848 prevented the completion of his theological studies at the Collegium Germanicum et Hungaricum in Rome; he was ordained to the priesthood on 28 March of that year, and returned to Würzburg, where he pursued his ecclesiastical preparation for another year. In 1849, he was appointed chaplain at Zellingen, and for some time devoted himself to the duties of his office. In 1849, he successfully defended for the degree of doctor of theology before the Ludwig-Maximilians-Universität München with his dissertation on a treatise on the Trinitarian teaching of St. Gregory Nazianzen (Die Lehre von der göttlichen Dreieinigkeit nach d. heil. Gregor von Nazianz, Ratisbon, 1850). The qualities of the young doctor induced the theological faculty of the Ludwig-Maximilians-Universität München to offer him a place as instructor (privatdozent) in theology, which he accepted. Following ancient usage, he justified the confidence of the Ludwig-Maximilians-Universität München by a printed thesis (Habilitationschrift) on the later Protestant theories of the origins of the Catholic Church (De catholicæ ecclesiæ primordiis recentiorum Protestantium systemata expenduntur, Ratisbon, 1851). Henceforth, he devoted himself without reserve to his professorial duties.

In 1852, he was called to the University of Würzburg as professor extraordinary of canon law and church history; after three years he was promoted to the full possession of that chair in 1855. To his other duties, he added the teaching of patrology. In those years, the University of Würzburg rejoiced in the possession of such theologians as Hettinger, Denzinger, Hähnlein, and Hergenröther.

Hergenröther was often honoured by election to the office of dean of his faculty, and occasionally to the University Senate; the latter office he never held after 1871, because of his opposition to Ignaz von Döllinger. For a similar reason he was never chosen to be rector of the university. Until 1869, Hergenröther was occupied as teacher and writer, chiefly with early Christian and Byzantine ecclesiastical history. The discovery (1851) of the Greek Christian text known as the Philosophoúmena led him to examine its disputed authorship in a series of studies in the Tübinger Theol. Quartalschrift (1852) and in the supplementary volume (1856) to the first edition of the Kirchenlexikon of Heinrich Joseph Wetzer and Benedict Welte. He again defended the authorship of Hippolytus in the Œsterreichische Vierteljahrschrift f. kath. Theol. (1863).

Hergenröther was especially interested in the career of Photius and in the origins of the Greek Schism, and kept up continuous research in the principal libraries for manuscripts of the works of Photius, in order to exhibit the original materials in as perfect a text as could be established. This led to the publication (Ratisbon, 1857) of the work, Photii Constantinopolitani Liber de Spiritus Sancti mystagogia. He contributed essays on the same work and on the Amphilochia of Photius to the Tüb. Theol. Quartalschrift (1858).

In 1860 appeared at Paris the Migne edition of "Photius". It offered many textual emendations that were owing to Hergenröther, particularly in the "Amphilochia"; it was against his will that his earlier edition of the "Liber de Sp. Sancti mystagogia" was reprinted by Migne. When Aloys Pichler's work on the history of the separation of the Eastern and Western Churches appeared 1864 in Munich, Hergenröther was prepared to criticize it in the most thorough manner, which he did in a series of studies in a Würzburg theological periodical, the "Chilianeum" (1864–65), and in the "Archiv. f. kath. Kirchenrecht" (1864–65). The results of his twelve years of research in the history of the Greek Schism appeared finally in the classical work, Photius Patriarch von Constantinopel, sein Leben, seine Schriften, und das griechische Schisma (3 vols., Ratisbon, 1867–69). An additional volume bears the title: Monumenta Græca ad Photium ejusque historiam pertinentia (Ratisbon). In this monumental work it is difficult to say whether the palm belongs to the author's extensive knowledge of all the manuscript material, to his profound erudition, or to his calm objective attitude. Karl Krumbacher, the historian of Byzantine literature, says that the work cannot be surpassed. In these volumes Hergenröther laid here in minute detail the origins of the Byzantine Church, its development since the fourth century, and after the death of Photius until the completion of the schism in the twelfth and thirteenth centuries.

While professor of canon law at Würzburg, Hergenröther published several important historico-canonical essays on such subjects as early ecclesiastical reordinations (Ester, Vierteljahrsch. f. kath. Theol., 1862), the canonical relations of the various rites in the Catholic Church (Archiv f. kath. Kirchenrecht, 1862), the politico-ecclesiastical relations of Spain and the Holy See (ibid., 1863–66), and the canon law of the Greeks to the end of the ninth century (ibid., 1870). His interest in the ecclesiastical vicissitudes of his own day was manifested by valuable essays on the States of the Church after the French Revolution (Hist.-polit. Blätter, 1859), spirit of the age (Zeitgeist) and papal sovereignty (Der Katholik, 1861), and the Franco-Sardinian Treaty (Frankfort, 1865). Among his historico-apologetic essays are his treatises on the errors condemned by the Holy See in the Encyclical (Syllabus) of 8 December 1864 (in the Chilianeum, 1865), the veneration of the Blessed Virgin in the first ten centuries of the Christian Era (Münster, 1870).

He was a regular contributor of similar but briefer articles to the Würzburg periodicals, "Die katholische Wochenschrift" and the "Chilianeum". Hergenröther was constantly engaged in attempting to develop a genuine Catholic sentiment and truly Christian life among the faithful. He preached frequently, and was always a welcome speaker at the general assemblies of the German Catholic associations (Vereine; 1863–77). For the Fulda meeting of the Prussian bishops (1870) he prepared an exhaustive historical study on the spoliation of the Papal States, in which he developed at length the arguments for the temporal power of the papacy.

At the Ludwig-Maximilians-Universität München, he gained the reputation of being one of the most learned theologians on the Ultramontane side of the Infallibility question, which had begun to be discussed; and in 1868 he was sent to Rome to arrange the proceedings of the Vatican Council. Together with some other Catholics, Hergenröther deplored the attitude that certain Catholic theologians assumed from about 1860, in particular that of the celebrated historian Döllinger. The latter's work Kirche und Kirchen, Papsttum und Kirchenstaat (1861) was criticized by Hergenröther in "Der Katholik". At the Munich meeting of Catholic savants (1863), Hergenröther was one of the eight who sent in a written protest against the opening discourse of Döllinger on the past and present of Catholic theology. Among the other signers were Heinrich Moufang von Schäzler, Paul Leopold Haffner, Franz Hettinger, and Matthias Joseph Scheeben. Hergenröther was soon called on to answer the pamphlet of Dr. Friedrich Bernhard Ferdinand Michelis, Kirche oder Partei? Ein offenes u. freies Wort an den deutschen Episkopat (Church or Faction? A Frank Address to the German Episcopate), in which this writer attacked violently the "Mainz" and the "Roman" theologians. Hergenröther's answer appeared in the "Chilianeum" (1865) under the title of Kirche u. nicht Partei. Eine Antwort auf die jüngste Broschüre des Herrn Dr. Fr. Michelis (Church and not Faction: an Answer to the latest Brochure of Dr. Michelis). In the same review (1863) Hergenröther had written a critical account of the latest efforts of Western Catholics for ecclesiastical reunion with the Oriental Churches.

The opening of the Vatican Council (1870) brought to a head the domestic conflict in Germany. Hergenröther was the foremost defender of the council and its decrees; as early as 1868 he had been appointed, with Hettinger, consultor for the preparation of the council's work and had taken up his residence at Rome. His knowledge of ecclesiastical history, canon law, and Catholic dogma made him a valuable co-labourer in the many careful and detailed preliminary meetings of the council commission. In the meantime he prepared, with Hettinger, and published in the "Chilianeum" (1869) a memorial of the theological faculty of Würzburg in reply to five questions, submitted by the Bavarian Government, concerning the approaching council. He also published (Der Katholik, 1871) another outlined memorial concerning the Vatican Council, in reply to eleven questions submitted by the Bavarian Minister of Worship to the theological and law faculties of Würzburg. This memorial, though projected, was never formally called for by the Government.

The opposition to the Vatican Council reached its acme in the work Der Papst und das Concil, by "Janus" (Döllinger). In the same year (1869) Hergenröther prepared his "Anti-Janus", an historico-theological critique (Freiburg, 1870). He also published a number of small brochures in favour of the council and against Döllinger, e. g. "Die Irrthümer logischer Censor" (Freiburg, 1870), and a critique of Dr. Döllinger's declaration of 28 March 1871 (Freiburg, 1871). His pen was also active in the "Historisch-politische Blätter", where he published (1870) a series of articles on the "Allgemeine Zeitung" and its letters from the council, on papal infallibility before the Vatican Council, and on ancient Gallicans and modern Appellants. In 1871 he published the solid study "Das unfehlbare Lehrant des Papstes" [The Infallible Magisterium (teaching office) of the pope, Passau, 1871]. These grave and exhausting labours were crowned and partially summarized by a new work, Katholische Kirche u. christlicher Staat in ihrer geschichtlichen Entwicklung u. in Beziehung auf die Gegenwart (The Catholic Church and the Christian State, in their historical development and their relations to the present), together with an "Anti-Janus vindicatus" (Freiburg, 1872, 2nd annotated ed., Freiburg, 1876). The former is a thesaurus of information concerning politico-ecclesiastical conflicts of the past, and is marked throughout by an uncompromising tone. It was translated into Italian (Pavia, 1877) and into English (London, 1876; Baltimore, 1889).

He published his Handbuch der allgemeinen Kirchengeschichte (Manual of General Church History) in the "theological Library" of Herder (Freiburg, 1876). A second annotated edition appeared in 1879; in 1880 a third volume was added, containing the notes and documentary evidence. This work was then and remains yet unsurpassed for abundance of information, accuracy of narrative, and manifold sources of historical proof. A third edition appeared (1884–86), in which the notes are no longer printed apart, but accompany the text. The writer of this article is the editor of a fourth edition (3 vols., Freiburg, 1902-1909). When it was proposed to bring out a new edition of the "Kirchenlexikon" of Wetzer and Welte, Hergenröther was naturally suggested as the savant most capable of executing this gigantic task. He accepted it, but was compelled to abandon it when scarcely begun; his elevation to the dignity of cardinal with the obligation of a Roman residence, left him no freedom for the enterprise. The first volume contains many articles from his pen, some of them quite lengthy. He was unable to do as much for the other volumes–in all there are eighty-seven articles signed by him. Other minor literary tasks consumed his spare hours in the last period of his life at Würzburg. The various subjects were Pius IX (Würzburg, 1876); Athanasius the Great (Cologne, 1876); Cardinal Maury in "Katholische Studien" (Würzburg, 1878); a short history of the popes (Würzburg, 1878); the vow of poverty among the Oriental monks in "Archiv f. kath. Kirchenrecht" (1877); the canonical significance of nomination (ibid., 1878). Hergenröther's works in the departments of church history and canon law, and his firm attitude on the great ecclesiastical questions of the day, won for him the confidence of all the bishops and Catholic scholars of Germany.

In 1877 Pius IX had recognized his services to the Vatican Council and the ecclesiastical sciences by making him a domestic prelate. When Leo XIII determined to open the Vatican Archives to the scholars of the world, he found in him the savant to whom he might safely entrust the practical execution of this generous act. Hergenröther was made Cardinal-Deacon of San Nicolò in Carcere on 12 May 1879. At a later date he was transferred to Santa Maria in Via Lata. He was also appointed Cardinal-Prefect of the Apostolic Archives, a new office, which he was the first to fill, and in which he was charged with the establishment of research work in the Vatican Archives and the systematizing, on scientific lines, of scholarly work amid these rich treasures. That he executed the views of Leo XIII in a satisfactory and even generous manner, is acknowledged by the numerous historical workers who have laboured in the archives since 1879. Hergenröther was also a member of several Roman congregations (Index, Studies, and Extraordinary Ecclesiastical Affairs), and protector of several religious institutes. He undertook, moreover, to edit the official correspondence (Regesta) of Leo X, a rather thankless task, and one of great difficulty, because of the exceedingly bad handwriting of that day. He was efficiently aided by his younger brother, Franz Hergenröther, who had accompanied him to Rome. Before his death the cardinal published eight parts or fasciculi of this extensive work, "Leonis X Pont. Maximi Regesta", Vol. I (Freiburg, 1884–85). A small part of the second volume was brought out (Freiburg, 1891) by his brother and fellow-editor, since which time the publication has ceased by reason of the latter's return to Würzburg as canon capitular of the cathedral.

Cardinal Hergenröther undertook another work of the most exacting nature, the continuation of Karl Joseph von Hefele's "History of the Councils", two volumes of which he published before his death (vol. VIII, Freiburg, 1887; vol. IX, 1890). The latter volume contains the preliminary history of the Council of Trent and is also a history of the Lutheran Reformation.

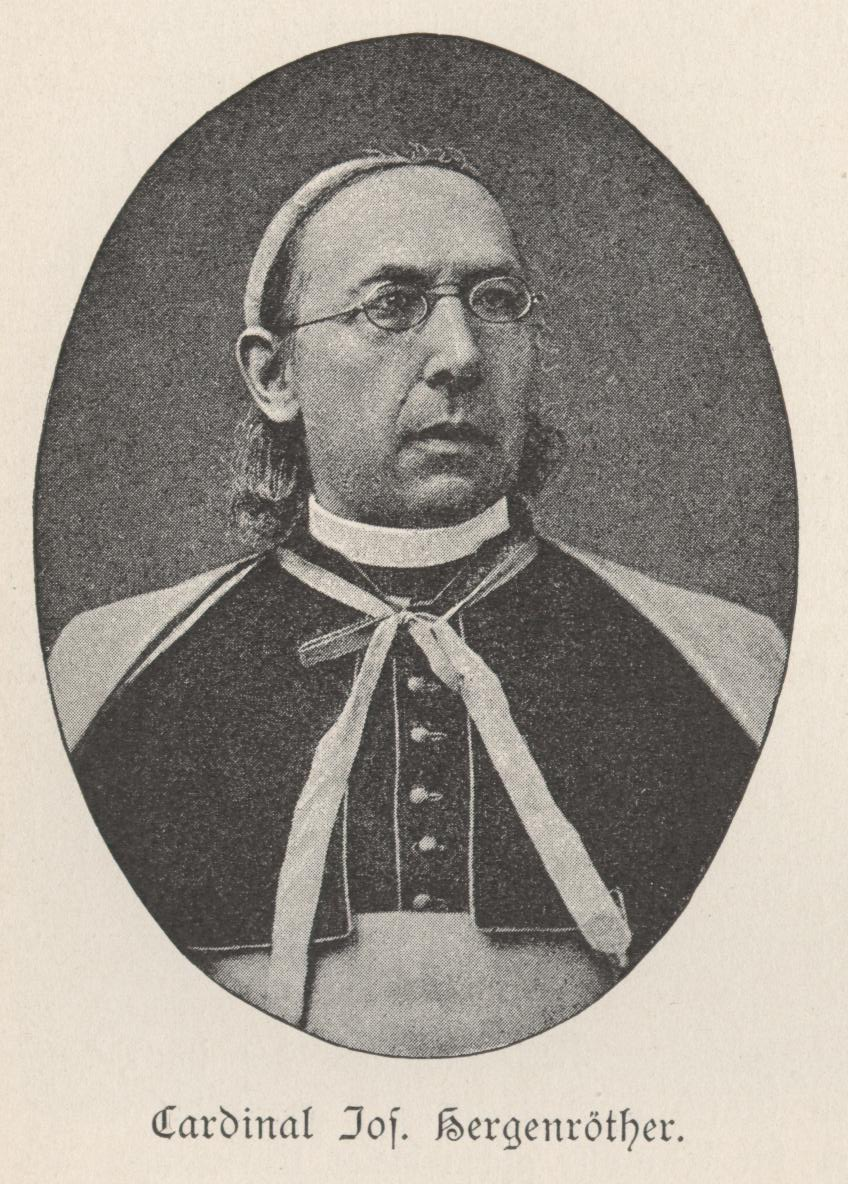
Joseph Hergenröther circa 1887.

He suffered much in the last years of his life, as the result of an apoplectic attack which crippled him grievously though it did not affect the brightness and vigour of his intellect. He was able to keep up his literary labours to the day of his death. During the summer vacation of 1890 he took up his residence in the Cistercian Abbey of Mehrerau (on the Bodensee) the hospitality of which he had more than once enjoyed. In this secluded spot he met with another apoplectic stroke, and died. He was laid to rest in the church of the abbey. In 1897 a suitable monument was erected to his memory by his friends, and dedicated (25 March).

He was a stanch supporter of the infallibility dogma. In 1870 he wrote Anti-Janus, an answer to The Pope and the Council, by Janus (Ignaz von Döllinger and Johann Friedrich), which made a great sensation at the time. In 1877 he was made prelate of the papal household; he became cardinal deacon in 1879, and was afterwards made curator of the Vatican archives.

He died in Mehrerau Abbey near Bregenz in 1890.

His portrait was apparently painted by the Swiss-born American artist Adolfo Müller-Ury (1862-1947) during the two years he spent studying in Italy 1882-1884, and was probably signed Ad. Muller. Its present whereabouts is unknown.

== Works ==
Of Hergenröther's other works, the most important are:

- his history of the Papal States since the Revolution (Der Kirchenstaat seit der französischen Revolution, Freiburg i. B., 1860; Fr. trans., Leipzig, 1860)
- his great work on the relations of church and state (Katholische Kirche und christlicher Staat in ihrer geschichtlichen Entwickelung und in Beziehung auf Fragen der Gegenwart, 2 parts, Freiburg i. B., 1872; 2nd edition expanded, 1876; Eng. trans., London, 1876, Baltimore, 1889)
- his universal church history (Handbuch der allgemeinen Kirchengeschichte, 3 vols, Freiburg i. B., 1876-1880; 2nd edition, 1879, etc.; 3rd edition, 1884-1886; 4th edition, by Peter Kirsch, 1902, etc.; French trans., Paris, 1880, etc.)

He also found time for a while to edit the new edition of Wetzer and Welte's Kirchenlexikon (1877), to superintend the publication of part of the Regesta of Pope Leo X (Freiburg i. B., 1884-1885), and to add two volumes to Karl Josef von Hefele's Conciliengeschichte (ib., 1887 and 1890).

== Notes ==
Catholic Church titles
Preceded by John Henry Newman, C.O.	Cardinal Protodeacon; 1890	Succeeded by Tommaso Maria Zigliara, O.P.
