= Hearder =

Hearder is a surname. Notable people with the surname include:

- Jeremy Hearder (born 1936), Australian author, historian, former diplomat and public servant
- Jonathan Nash Hearder (1809–1876), British electrical engineer, inventor, and educator

== See also ==
- Herder (surname)
