= Bartholomäus Herder =

German publisher

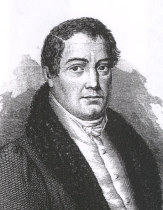
Bartholomäus Herder

Bartholomäus Herder (22 August 1774 in the Swabian free town of Rottweil – 11 March 1839 at Freiburg im Breisgau), was the founder of the publishing firm Verlag Herder.

== Early life and education ==
Originally destined for Holy orders, he was elaborating, while yet a student at the abbey school of St. Blasien and at the University of Dillingen, his plan of "gaining his livelihood by the dissemination of good books" as a "scholarly publisher".

== Career ==
In 1801, during the turbulent period prior to the dissolution of the old German Empire, he began his career, at the instance of the Prince-Bishop (soon afterwards Prince Primate) Karl Theodor von Dalberg, in the capacity of "publisher to the princely episcopal court of Constance", at Meersburg on the Lake of Constance, the episcopal residence and seat of a seminary. Among his first publications, which were mainly of a theological and pedagogic character, were Wessenberg's Archiv für pastorale Conferenzen in den Landkapiteln des Bisthums Constanz (1802–27).

In 1810 Herder transferred his business to Freiburg im Breisgau, where, in connection with the university, he gave a more comprehensive character to his publications and developed in new directions. One of his most important publications was Karl von Rotteck's Allgemeine Geschichte vom Anfang der historischen Kenntniss bis auf unsere Zeiten (9 volumes, 1812–27; the 15th edition being issued by another firm), which for more than a generation was "the gospel of the educated liberal middle classes". Being entrusted with the publication of the official war bulletin, the Teutsche Blätter, by the royal and imperial authorities at headquarters as early as the end of 1813, Herder went to Paris with the allied armies in 1815 in Metternich's train as "Director of the Royal and Imperial Field Press".

Subsequent to the conclusion of peace he founded an art institution for lithography, copperplate engraving, and modelling in terra cotta, in connexion with his publishing business. In the course of time upwards of three hundred pupils were turned out from this institution, while the sumptuous illustrations and maps that were issued mark an epoch in the history of this branch of technic–especially the Heilige Schriften des Alten und Neuen Testamentes in 200 biblischen Kupfern (the Holy Writ of the Old and the New Testament in 200 biblical engravings), of which he reproduced numerous impressions by an original lithographic process, and Woerl's Atlas von Central-Europa in 60 Blättern (Atlas of Central Europe in 60 plates, 1830), which was the earliest employment of two-colour lithography. As late as 1870 this atlas rendered important service to the German army by reason of the map of France it contained. Although such great achievements won a European reputation for the house, the commercial profits derived therefrom were entirely disproportionate to the expenditure. Consequently, the condition of the house at Bartholomäus Herder's death in 1839 was by no means a satisfactory one. His two sons, Karl Raphael Herder and Benjamin Herder succeeded him.
