= Johann Baptist von Hirscher =

German Catholic theologian (1788–1865)

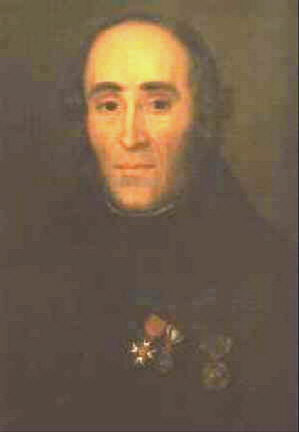
Johann Baptist von Hirscher

Johann Baptist von Hirscher (20 January 1788, Bodnegg – 4 September 1865) was a German Catholic theologian associated with the Catholic Tübingen school. He exerted a great influence in the areas of moral theology, homiletics, and catechetics.

== Life ==
He was born in Alt-Ergarten, Bodnegg. His parents were pious peasants. He studied at Weissenau monastery school, the lyceum of Constance. The vicar general of the diocese, Ignaz Heinrich von Wessenberg became his patron. Hirscher attended the University of Freiburg and entered the seminary in Meersburg in 1809. He was ordained priest in 1810. For two years he was curate at Röhlingen (today part of Ellwangen); in 1812 he became a tutor in the theological faculty of Ellwangen; and in 1814 assistant professor of philosophy at the Ellwangen lyceum.

In 1817 he was elected to the chair of moral and pastoral theology in University of Tübingen, where he remained twenty years. There he taught canon law, moral, and pastoral theology. In 1819 he was a founder and co-editor of the Theologische Quartalschrift. In 1837 he became professor of moral theology and catechetics at the University of Freiburg in the Breisgau, where, for a quarter of a century, he exerted a very great influence.

His book on Christian morality, published in 1835, ran through five editions. He defined Christian morality as the scientific doctrine of the effective return of man to the Divine filiation through the merits of Christ. In the earlier editions some of his expressions and opinions, owing to the influence of the day, were censured; he corrected them by degrees and Kleutgen considers that the last editions are perfectly orthodox. The book marked a reaction against rationalistic morality. Hirscher closely traced the moral act to a religious origin and a religious end, and he detested virtue that did not proceed from faith. Though not satisfactory from the point of view of confessors, Hirscher's work, as his apologist Hettinger says, had a salutary effect, and Hettinger himself made use of it.

Hirscher was made a canon in 1839, and dean of the chapter in 1850; after 1847 he was often sent as delegate of the university to the First Chamber of the Grand Duchy of Baden. He took a special interest in the education of poor and abandoned children, himself establishing three houses of refuge.

In 1854 Hirscher was hostile to the definition of the Immaculate Conception, though he was not opposed to the dogma itself. His advanced age forced him to cease teaching in the summer of 1863. He died in 1865 and was buried at the Alter Friedhof in Freiburg.

== Reformist ideas ==
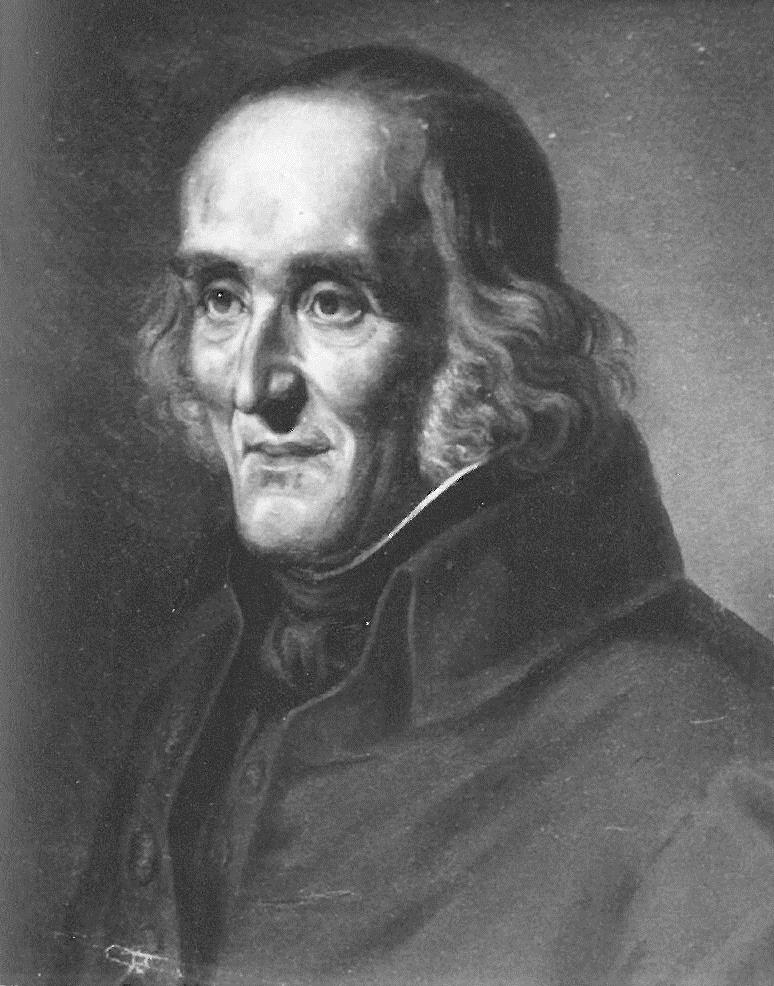
Hirscher at seventy

Hirscher's ideas on the reform of the Church were both complex and controversial. As a young man he had written a work on the Mass entitled "De genuina missæ notione", in which the idea of the sacrifice was relegated to the background, and which was put on the Index. Later he was blamed for never having formally retracted the book; he answered that at least he had held quite orthodox theories concerning the Mass in his later writings. Nevertheless, a number of Catholics were not reassured, and when in 1842 and the following years there was question of appointing Hirscher coadjutor of Freiburg, the historian Hurter and Baron de Rinck, raised a cry of alarm. The "Schweizerische Kirchenzeitung" and the "Revue Sion" accused Hirscher of being an enemy of Rome and everything Roman, of dreaming of a German national Church, of opposing celibacy, the Breviary, and ecclesiastical discipline with regard to mixed marriages, of preventing the Freiburg theological review from attacking his benefactor Wessenberg, of being the friend of the Baden Liberals. Hirscher replied in the "Revue Sion" (30 November 1842), and Schleyer, dean of the University of Freiburg, defended him in his book "Hirscher und seine Ankläger". But Rinck continued to write to the effect that if Hirscher were accepted as bishop there would be a worse schism than that of Ronge.

In 1842, Hirscher was passed up for consideration as bishop of Freiburg. Two years later, when the Government of Württemberg wanted to have Hirscher appointed coadjutor to the aged Bishop Keller of Rottenburg, Rome refused. These suspicions were confirmed by the pamphlets Hirscher published in 1849, on the social condition of the present day and the Church, "Die socialen Zustände der Gegenwart", and on the present state of religion, "Die kirchlichen Zustände der Gegenwart". These brochures created a profound sensation, for in them Hirscher showed himself hostile to the Catholic Associations' movement, which gave birth to the first general Congress of the German Catholics at Mainz, in 1848; he feared that the movement might lead to imprudent demonstrations by the Catholics. He preferred lay associations to be undenominational, and favoured a synodal organization in which the laity would be represented, and which should be periodically convened by the bishops and presided over by them.

He showed himself opposed to the preaching of missions in villages. Several of the bishops were aroused, and attention was drawn to the opinions in Hirscher's pamphlets that had been condemned already by Pope Pius VI in his Constitution "Auctorem fidei". The canonist George Phillips, the future Bishop Fessler, and Fathers Amberger of Ratisbon and Heinrich of Mainz, refuted Hirscher. He was condemned by the Congregation of the Index, and submitted with sincerity, for which Hettinger praises him; but he defended himself against his adversaries in another brochure.

== Works ==
In homiletics, also, Hirscher's books marked a reaction against the half-rationalistic books of meditation written by the Swiss Heinrich Zschokke, which were then widely read. Hirscher drew a distinction between false Aufklärung, which is purely negative and confined to combating superstition, and true Aufklärung, which is based on the Gospel. He published commentaries on the Gospels of Lent (1829), on the Gospels of each Sunday (1837), and on the Epistles of each Sunday.

His work on catechetics, published in 1840, was followed, in 1842, by a catechism, which was introduced into the Diocese of Freiburg and gave rise to lively discussions. To defend his catechism, Hirscher published "Zur Verständigung über den von mir bearbeiteten und demnächst erscheinenden Katechismus der christkatholischen Religion" (1842), and "Nachträge zur Verständigung" (1843).

When eighty years of age, he published a brochure entitled "Besorgnisse hinsichtlich der Zweckmässigkeit unseres Religionsunterrichtes" (1863). He regarded the catechism as the history of the Kingdom of God. The first two books treat of God, the Creation, and the Redemption; the next three, of the individualization of the Kingdom of God in souls and of its coming within and without us, that is to say, of justification, sanctification, and the Church; the sixth book treats of the Kingdom of God in the other life. Kleutgen criticized Hirscher for insisting too exclusively on the work of education that God works within us, and neglecting to emphasize the gratuitous creation of the new man by grace. However, such as it was, Hirscher's catechetical work, with Alban Stolz's commentaries on it, helped to advance the teaching of religion in Germany.

In 1862 after collaborating with Ignaz von Döllinger in drawing up the programme of the famous congress of Catholic scientists to be held at Munich, the following year, he quietly withdrew, judging that the time was not ripe for such a meeting. In the First Chamber of the Baden Diet Hirscher fought vigorously for the liberties of the Church. In 1848 he proposed a motion that the grand duke should be asked to employ "every means to preserve genuine Christianity, active and living, among all classes of society, especially among the young". In 1850 he asked that the grand duke should attend to the wants of the Church, and that he should grant without delay the establishment of three or four petits séminaires, where future clerics should be trained during the time of their gymnasium studies. In November, 1853, he drew up the address by which the chapter of Freiburg allied itself with Archbishop Vicari in his struggle against the bureaucracy of the State, and defended Vicari in his brochure, "Zur Orientirung über den derzeitigen Kirchenstreit" (1854).

Hirscher was an excellent priest whom many of his contemporaries, according to the testimony of Adam Franz Lennig, venerated as a patriarch, and for whom Johann Baptist Orbin had a real devotion. He aroused some to enthusiasm: the celebrated publicist, Alban Stolz, who did so much towards the Catholic revival in Germany, collaborated with Hirscher, with whom he spent an evening each week, and on one occasion wrote a vehement letter to a bishop who had forbidden his theologians to study at Freiburg, for fear of their falling under the influence of Hirscher; he asserted even that at first he had placed the writings of Hirscher above those of the Fathers. Hirscher's misfortune was to have known too little of Christian antiquity and especially of the Middle Ages. What he criticized under the name of Scholasticism in his pamphlet of 1823, on the relations of the Gospels with Scholastic theology, were formulæ of a handbook more impregnated with the philosophy of Wolff than with that of Thomas Aquinas. Finally, the sometimes too bitter attacks of which he was the object prevented the diffusion of certain of his ideas; but, on the other hand, his zeal as a catechist, his exalted piety, his personal influence, the purity of his intentions, the ardour he displayed in his defence of Vicari, the part he played in the religious awakening in Baden, recognized by the "Historisch-politische Blätter" in 1854, won for Hirscher the gratitude of German Catholics.

- "Geschichte Jesu Christi, des Sohnes Gottes und Weitheilandes" (1839)
- "Erörterungen über die grossen religiösen Fragen der Gegenwart" (1846)
- "Leben der seligsten Jungfrau und Gottesmutter Maria" (1854)
- "Hauptstücke des christlichen Glaubens" (1857).

== Sources ==
- Friedrich Lauchert, Revue internationale de théologie (1894), 627-56; (1895), 260-80, 723-38; (1896) 151-74;
- Hermann Rolfus, Preface to Hirscher's Nachgelassene kleinere Schriften (Freiburg, 1868);
- Kossing in Weech, Badische Biographieen, I (Karlsruhe, 1881), 372-7;
- Schleyer, Hirscher und seine Ankläger (Augsburg, 1843);
- Heinrich Hurter, Hurter und seine Zeit (2 vols., Graz, 1876);
- Kleutgen, Theologie der Vorzeit (Paderborn, 1853);
- Thalhofer, Entwicklung des katholischen Katechismus in Deutschland von Canisius bis Deharbe (Freiburg, 1899);
