= Bühl (Baden) =

- Town
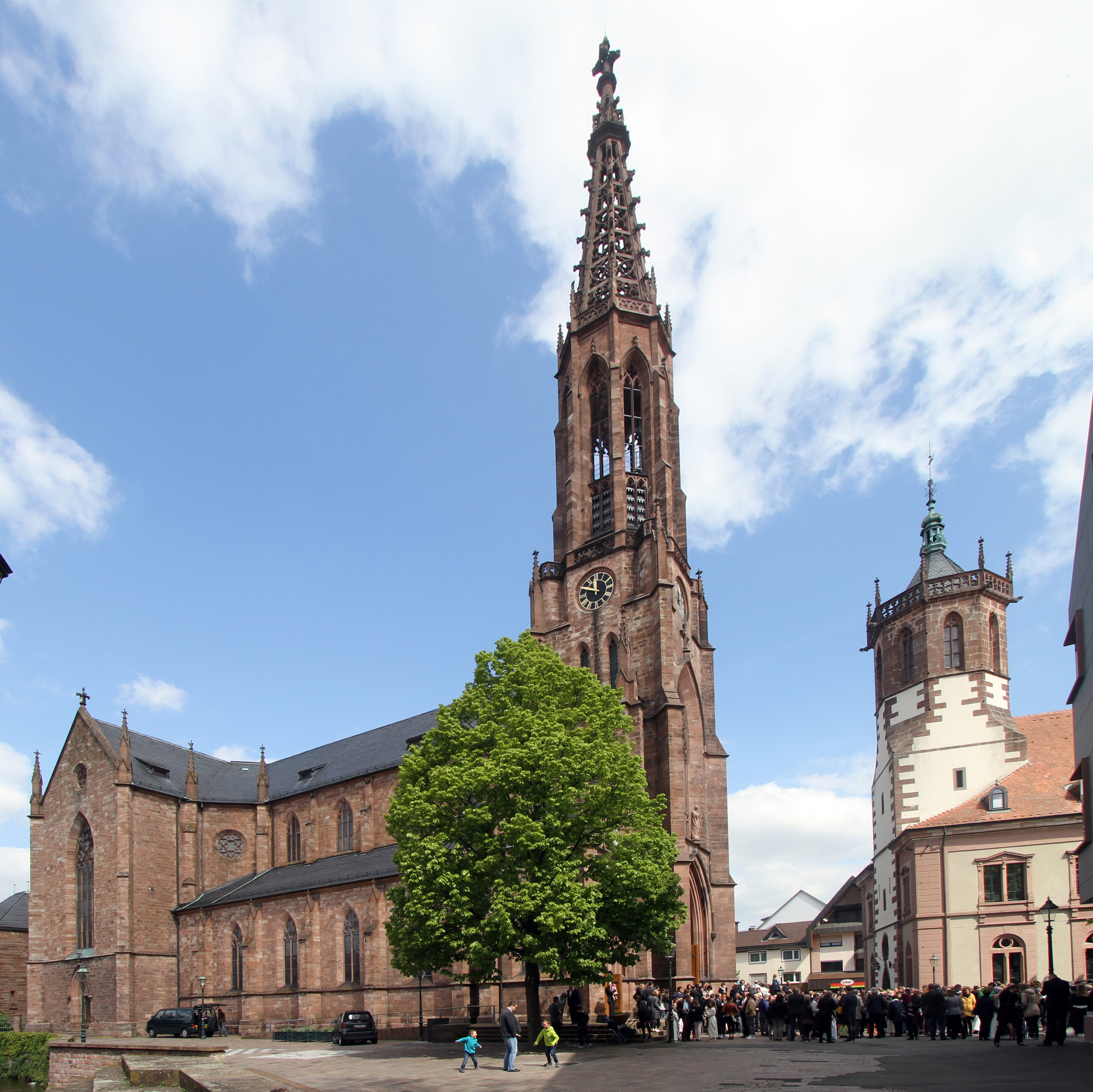
- Church of Saints Peter and Paul

- Coat of arms

- Location of Bühl within Rastatt district
- Interactive map of Bühl
- Location within Germany Location within Baden-Württemberg
- Coordinates: 48°41′43″N 8°8′6″E
- Country: Germany
- State: Baden-Württemberg
- Admin. region: Karlsruhe
- District: Rastatt
- Subdivisions: 11

Government
  - Mayor (2025 - Current): Matthias Bauernfeind (CDU)

Area
  - Total: 73.18 km^{2} (28.25 sq mi)
- Elevation: 138 m (453 ft)

Population (2025-12-31)
  - Total: 28,433
  - Density: 388.5/km^{2} (1,006/sq mi)
- Time zone: UTC+01:00 (CET)
  - Summer (DST): UTC+02:00 (CEST)
- Postal codes: 77801–77815
- Dialling codes: 07223
- Vehicle registration: RA, BH
- Website: www.buehl.de

The city of Bühl (German pronunciation: [byːl]; Low Alemannic: Bihl) is part of the district of Rastatt in the southwestern state of Baden-Württemberg, Germany. It has a history reaching back to the twelfth century and was formerly an agricultural town, especially famous for its plums. Bühl has a population of about 29,000, and is in the region between the Rhine Valley and the Black Forest.

Today it is mainly an industrial town, especially in the car manufacturing supply industry. Yet it still has preserved its character and is also renowned for its good restaurants.

Bühl is a town in the southwestern state of Baden-Württemberg, Germany, about 10 km (6.2 mi) South of Baden-Baden. Bühl is the third largest town in Rastatt County (Landkreis), after Rastatt itself and Gaggenau. Due to its location, size and importance it has become a central place for numerous towns, townships and villages in the neighbourhood. Bühl was proclaimed a major district town (Große Kreisstadt) on 1 January 1973, after it lost its status as an independent county seat during municipal reforms in Baden-Württemberg. The following villages form the district town of Bühl: Altschweier, Balzhofen, Eisental, Kappelwindeck, Oberbruch, Oberweier, Moos, Neusatz, Rittersbach, Vimbuch, Weitenung. Bühl forms a joint administrative community with the municipality of Ottersweier.

== History ==
=== Etymology ===
The word Bühl is derived from Old German "puhil" and Middle German "buhel", meaning "hill". The three yellow hills on blue ground seen on the coat of arms (already displayed in the court seal of Bühl in 1324) confirm this interpretation.
To distinguish Bühl from other towns named Bühl, not only in Germany, but other German-speaking countries like Switzerland and Austria, the town used the denominator Bühl (Baden) or Bühl/Baden, clearly identifying Bühl in the Margravate of Baden (Baden) and later in the Grand Duchy and the State of Baden. With the unification of Baden, Hohenzollern and Württemberg in 1952 forming the state of Baden-Württemberg and later the introduction of postal codes there was no need anymore for the denominator Baden. However, it is still used frequently.

== Notable people ==
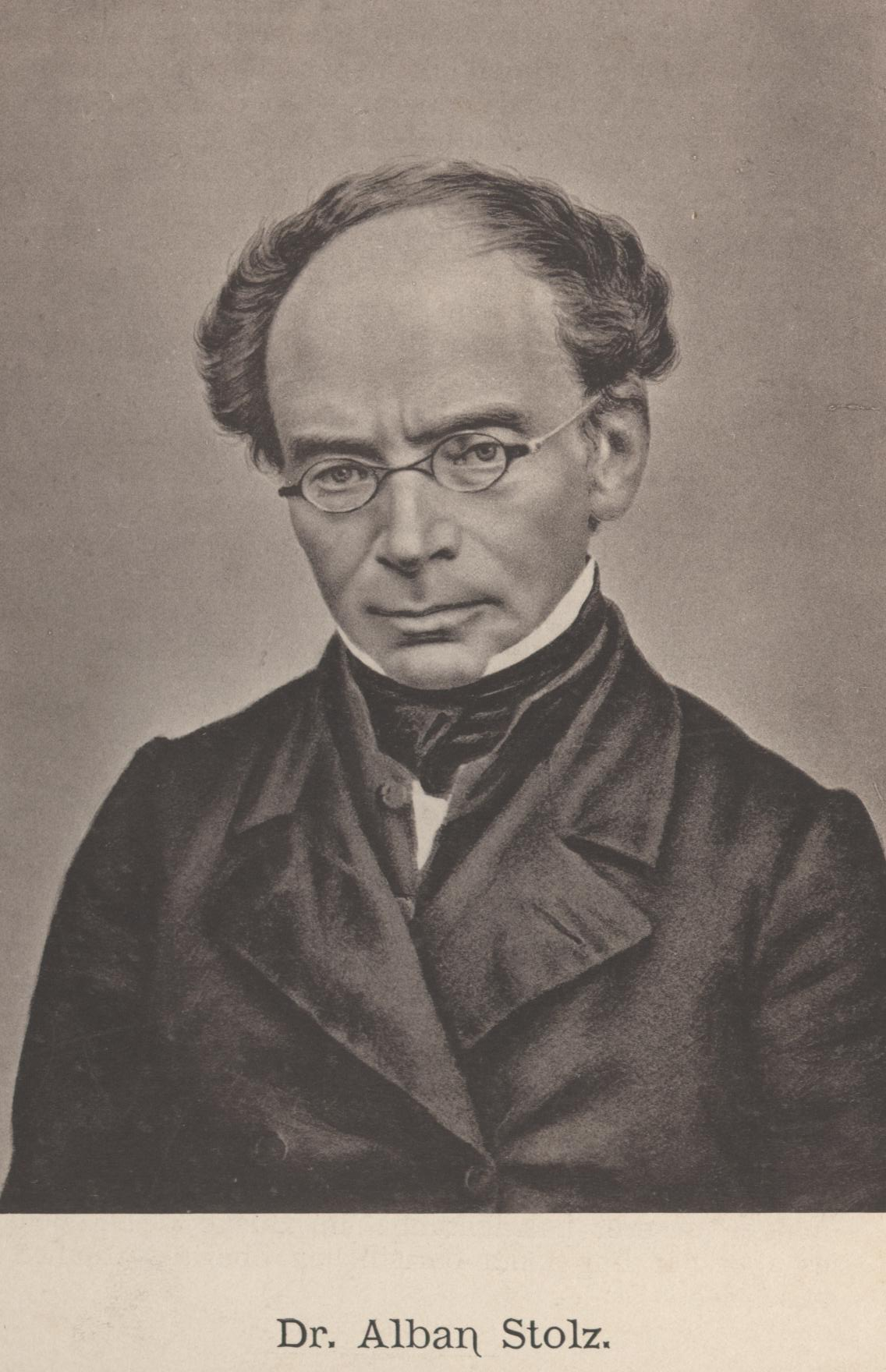
Alban Stolz, 1865

- Alban Stolz (1808–1883), professor of theology.
- Julius Ruska (1867–1949), orientalist and historian of science
- Haim Ernst Wertheimer (1893–1978), biochemist
- Herbert J. Bloch (1907-1987), philatelist and stamp dealer.
- Dominik Moll (born 1962), film director and screenwriter
- Odile Kennel (born 1967), writer of poetry and prose,

=== Sport ===
- Ralf Dujmovits (born 1961), mountaineer, climbed all 8.000m. mountains
- Christian Lusch (born 1981), sport shooter, silver medallist at the 2004 Summer Olympics
- Stefan Kneer (born 1985), handball player, played 73 games for Germany
