= Alban Stolz =

German Roman Catholic theologian and author

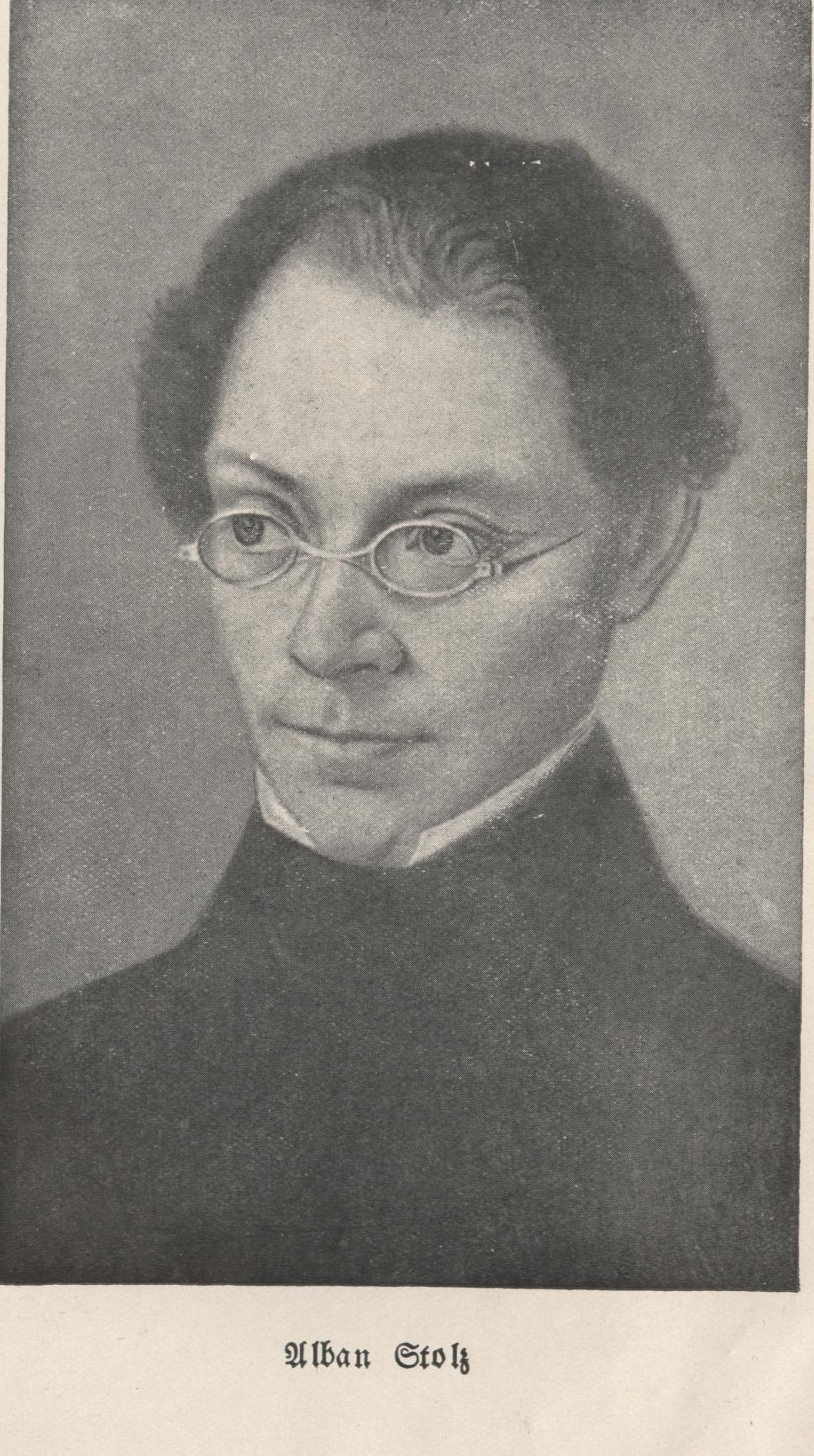
Alban Stolz, 1850

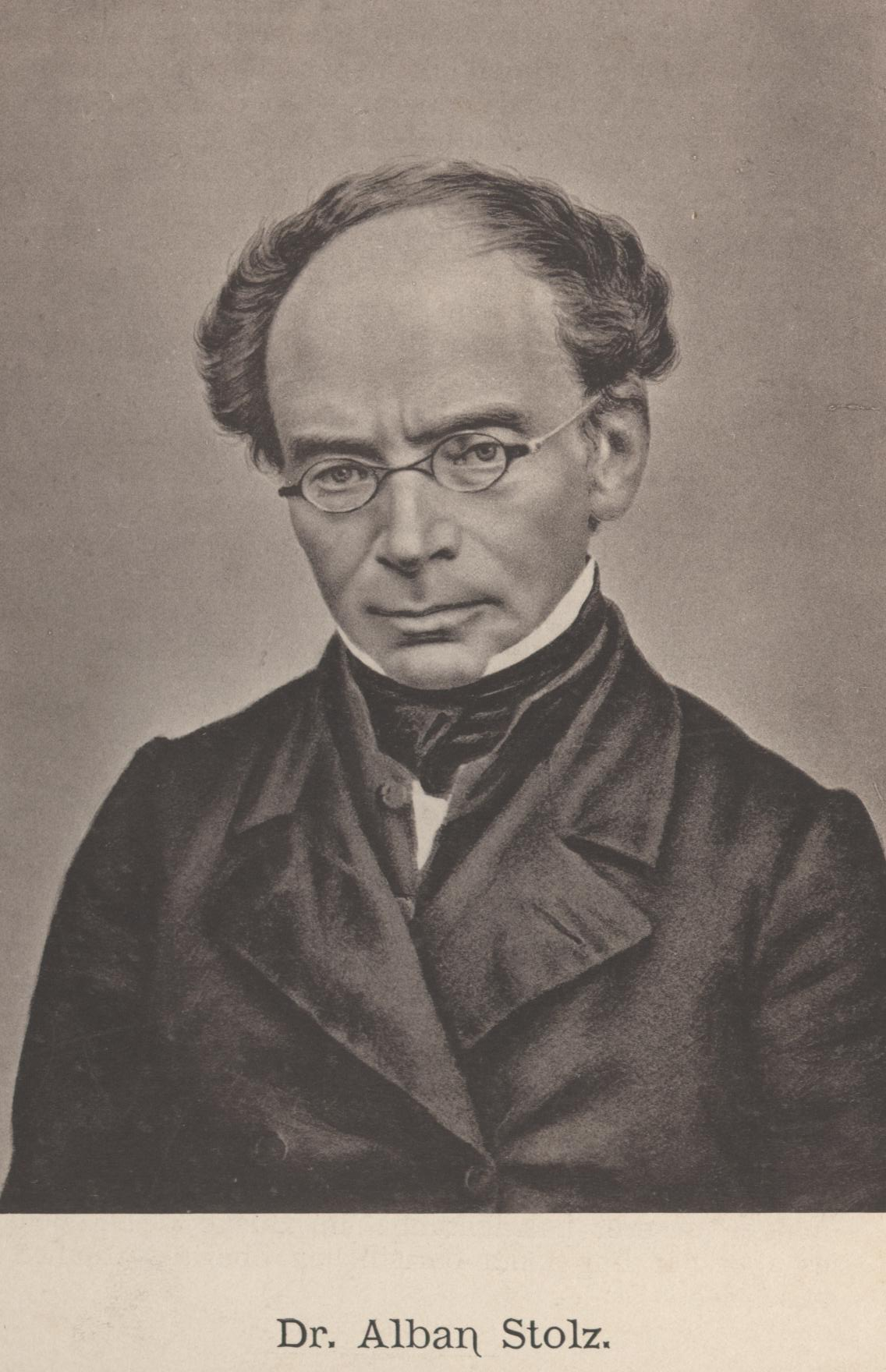
Alban Stolz, 1865

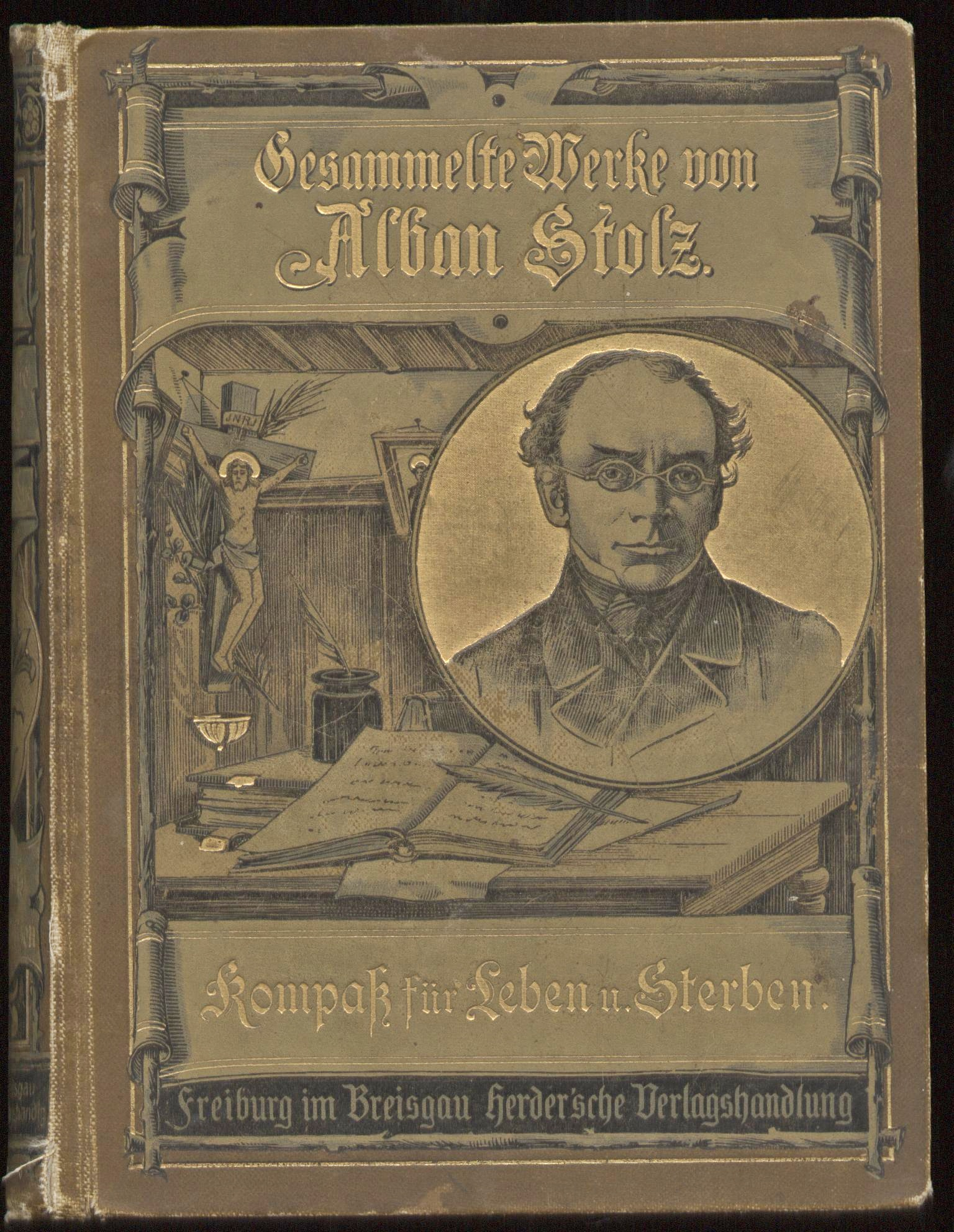
Contemporary bookcover

Alban Isidor Stolz (3 February 1808, Bühl, Grand Duchy of Baden – 16 October 1883) was a German Roman Catholic theologian and popular author.

== Life ==
Stolz was born at Bühl, Baden. He first studied at the gymnasium at Rastatt (1818–27), and then proceeded to the University of Freiburg. After attending lectures in jurisprudence for a brief period, he devoted himself to the study of theology (1827–30). He fell into scepticism; but after studying philology at the University of Heidelberg from 1830 to 1832 he regained his former Catholic faith.

Having determined to embrace the clerical state, he entered the ecclesiastical seminary at Freiburg in the autumn of 1832, and in August, 1833, was ordained to the priesthood. During the following eight years he was engaged in pastoral work, being curate first at Rothenfels in the Murgthal, and from June, 1835, at Neusatz, in the district of Bühl.

In the autumn of 1841 he was appointed instructor in religion at the gymnasium of Bruchsal, and on 1 March 1843, teacher of moral and pastoral theology at the theological college of Freiburg. From May, 1845 he was temporary director of this institution, but his appointment as permanent director was prevented by opponents holding Liberal views. Stolz launched polemical attacks on dissenting Catholics in a number of tracts published in 1845.

In 1845 he became doctor of theology, and in the autumn of 1847, despite continued Liberal opposition to his appointment, he was made professor of pastoral theology and pedagogics at the university. On 13 October 1848, he was named ordinary professor, and during 1859-60 he was rector of the university. For the German Revolutions of 1848, he blamed an alleged Jewish-Masonic conspiracy.

He was made honorary doctor of the theological faculty of the University of Vienna in 1865, and in 1868 archiepiscopal spiritual counsellor. Stolz was active in the charitable and social fields. In 1851 he founded at Freiburg the Catholic Journeymen's Association after the model of Kolping's, and conducted it as director and later as diocesan president. He also introduced into Freiburg the Society of St. Vincent de Paul, of which he remained director until his death. He devoted all the income from his writings to charity, to the Catholic Church, and to both the foreign and domestic missions. He died at Freiburg im Breisgau.

== Works ==
As a theologian Stolz was opinionated. Johann Baptist von Hirscher's writings, for which he had an unbounded veneration, were his chief authority.

Among his theological writings were:

- "Katechetische Auslegung des Freiburger Diöcesan-Katechismus (Hirscher's Katechismus) für Geistliche, Lehrer und Eltern" (3 vols., Freiburg, 1844–47);
- "Ueber die Vererbung sittlicher Anlagen" (University Report, Freiburg, 1859);
- "Erziehungskunst" (Freiburg, 1873; 7th ed. by Julius Mayer, 1910);
- "Homiletik als Anweisung den Armen das Evangelium zu predigen", published by Jakob Schmitt after the author's death (Freiburg, 1885; 2nd ed., 1899).

In the domain of popular religious literature, Stolz united a broad sense of humour and effective satire with religious feeling. His "Kalendar für Zeit und Ewigkeit", written for the years 1843-47, 1858–59, 1864, 1873–81, and 1884, was widely read. These discourses were collected and issued in four volumes under the titles "Kompass für Leben und Sterben" (1861 and frequently); "Das Vaterunser und der unendliche Gruss" (1861); "Wachholder-Geist gegen die Grundübel der Welt: Dummheit, Sünde und Elend" (1879); "Die Nachtigall Gottes" (1888).

Also very popular was his Butleresque "lives of the saints"; "Legende oder der christliche Sternhimmel" (in parts, 1851–60; 12th ed. in 1 quarto vol., 1904; 10th ed. in 4 octavo vols., 1894).

With this must be associated another ascetico-religious work, "Die heilige Elisabeth" (St. Elizabeth") (1865; 16th ed., 1909), which many consider the ripest work of Stolz. As the fruits of his travels in Spain in 1850 he published (1853) the humorous work "Spanisches für die gebildete Welt" (12th ed., 1908); his pilgrimage to the Holy Land in 1855 resulted in "Besuch bei Sim, Cham und Japhet, oder Reise in das Heilige Land" (1857; 10th ed., 1909). The works "Witterungen der Seele" (1867; 7th ed., 1910, "Wilder Honig" (1870; 4th ed., 1908), and "Dürre Kräuter" (1877; 4th ed., 1908), consist of excerpts from his diaries.

Stolz also wrote a number of pamphlets and brochures, some of polemical and some of moral and ascetical contents, collected under the title of "Kleinigkeiten" (2 collections, 1868 and 1887; 4th ed., 1909). His works were issued in nineteen volumes in Freiburg (1871–95), exclusive of the "Legende" and the explanation of the catechism; a popular edition of his works appeared in twelve volumes (1898–1909).

From his papers were edited an autobiography, "Nachtgebet meines Lebens. Nach dem Tode des Verfassers herausgegeben und durch Erinnerungen an Alban Stolz ergänzt von Jakob Schmitt" (Freiburg, 1885; 2nd ed., 1908), and "Predigten" (ed. Julius Mayer, Freiburg, 1908). Another source is the correspondence of Stolz with the convert, Julie Meineke, edited by Mayer under the title "Fügung und Führung" (Freiburg, 1909). Extracts from the writings of Stolz are given in the works "Edelschöner Stellen aus den Schriften von Alban Stolz. Ausgewählt von Heinrich Wagner" (Freiburg, 1905; 3rd ed., 1910), and "Bilder zur christkatholischen Glaubens- und Sittenlehre, aus den Schriften von Alban Stolz, Geistlichen und Lehrern sowie dem christlichen Volke gewidmet von Karl Telch" (Freiburg, 1909).
