= Franz Seraph Streber =

German numismatist

Franz Seraph Streber (26 February 1805 – 21 November 1864) was a German numismatist.

Streber was born in Deutenkofen, Lower Bavaria. The nephew of Franz Ignaz von Streber, he first studied theology and philosophy, then archaeology and numismatics, and in 1830 wrote as his dissertation for obtaining the degree of Doctor of Philosophy at the University of Erlangen, a paper on the genealogy of the Burgraves of Nuremberg. In 1854, he became a member of the Academy of Munich. In 1835, he was made professor of archaeology at the Ludwig-Maximilians-Universität München, of which he was twice rector. In 1827, he was made clerk, in 1830 assistant, and in 1841 curator of the royal cabinet of coins. He also worked on the numismatic collection of Vienna and prepared a critical catalogue of 18,000 Greek coins and a numismatico-iconographic lexicon with drawings of about 6000 Greek coins belonging to the Viennese and Munich collections.

In 1834, he published the work Numismata nonnulla græca, which corrected false and inexact designations of coins; this was crowned with a prize by the Academy of Paris as was also his important investigation concerning what are called the rainbow patina, which he was the first to recognize as Celtic. Further papers on Celtic, Greek, and medieval coins, also on archaeology, mythology, and the history of art, appeared chiefly in the publications of the Munich Academy. He also drew up a Promemoria that is preserved among the records of the royal cabinet of coins, as to the expenses and the plan of a monumental work covering the entire field of Greek numismatics that was to take the place of the old work by Eckhel and be about one-half larger. Streber was also prominent in politics as a strong supporter of the ecclesiastico-conservative party. He founded the association for a constitutional monarchy and religious freedom, and wrote many political memorials at its request. He died in Munich.

== Sources ==
Attribution

- - Transactions of the Academy of Munich, I (1865), 2661 sq.;
  - Histor.-politische Blátter, LV (1865), 85 sq.
