= Franz Hettinger =

German theologian

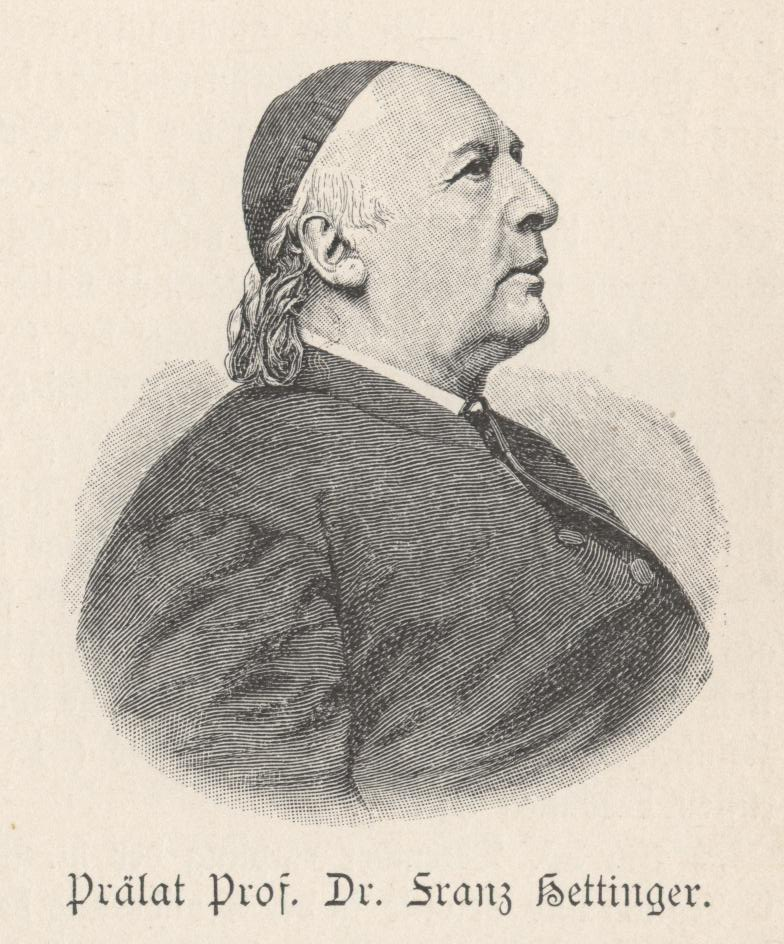
Franz Hettinger.

Franz Hettinger (13 January 1819, at Aschaffenburg – 26 January 1890, at Würzburg) was a German Catholic theologian.

== Life ==
He attended the gymnasium in his native city and afterwards, from 1836 to 1839, the academy in the same city, where he finished philosophy and began theology. As the teaching of the latter science was discontinued in this academy in 1839, he entered the ecclesiastical seminary at Würzburg and continued his studies there from the autumn of 1839 to that of 1841.

Acting on the advice of Bishop Georg Anton Stahl of Würzburg, who had taught him Christian doctrine in the gymnasium of Aschaffenburg, and had then been his professor of dogmatic theology at Würzburg until 1840, he went to Rome in the fall of 1841 for a four years' course in the German College. Here he was ordained on 2 September 1843, by Cardinal Patrizi, and upon the completion of his studies, in 1845, he received the degree of Doctor of Theology. In the first volume of his work, Aus Welt und Kirche, Hettinger gives an account of his student days in Rome.

After his return home, he was made chaplain at Alzenau, 3 October 1845. On 25 October 1847, he was appointed assistant, and on 20 May 1852, subregent, in the ecclesiastical seminary of Würzburg. On 1 June 1856, he became extraordinary professor, and on 16 May 1857, ordinary professor, of patrology and propaedeutics in the University of Würzburg.

He took up the teaching of apologetics and homiletics, with the direction of the homiletic seminary, on 1 January 1867. From 1871 he lectured on dogmatic theology in the place of Denzinger, whose health had failed, and after the latter's death, he became ordinary professor of dogmatic theology (16 Dec., 1884).

In 1859 he received the honorary degree of Doctor of Philosophy from the philosophical faculty of Würzburg. Twice, 1862–63 and 1867–68, he was rector of the university. The Catholic Encyclopedia describes Hettinger and his colleagues Joseph Hergenröther and Denzinger as "a brilliant constellation to which the theological faculty of Würzburg owed the high repute which it enjoyed for many years." Hettinger was made an honorary member of the college of doctors of the theological faculty of the University of Vienna in 1866, honorary doctor of theology of Louvain in 1884, and, in 1885, honorary member of the Academia Religionis Catholicæ of Rome.

He was called to Rome with Hergenröther in 1868 to assist in the preliminary work of the First Vatican Council, and appointed consultor to the theologico-dogmatic commission. On 21 November 1879, he was appointed a domestic prelate by Pope Leo XIII.

== Works ==
He was a distinguished scholar and writer of wide culture. His Apologie des Christenthums was published in 2 vols. in 5 parts (Freiburg im Br., 1863–67; 2nd ed., 1815–67; 3rd ed., 1867–69; 4th ed., 1871–73; 5th ed., 1875–80; 6th ed., 1885–87). After the death of Hettinger, his pupil, Professor Eugen Müller, of Strasburg, prepared the further editions in 5 vols.; 7th ed., 1895–98; 8th ed., 1899–1900; 9th ed., 1906–8. It was translated into French, English, Portuguese, and Spanish. This work was not intended for theologians alone, but also for circulation among people of culture generally. It is an important production of apologetic literature.

This was followed by the more strictly scientific "Lehrbuch der Fundamental-Theologie oder Apologetik" (2 parts, Freiburg, 1879; 2nd ed. in 1 vol., 1888). Aside from the "Apologie des Christenthums", the work "Aus Welt und Kirche; Bilder und Skizzen" had the widest circulation of any of Hettinger's writings (2 vols., Freiburg, 1885; 2nd ed., 1887; 3rd ed., 1893; 4th ed., 1897; 5th ed., 1902). It was the fruit of time in Italy, and particularly Rome, and of his other vacation trips through various parts of Germany, Austria (especially Tyrol), Switzerland, and France. Some of the sketches of travel from which this work was compiled appeared first in various issues of the "Historisch-politische Blätter" (1874–84).

His study of Dante inspired the following productions:

- "Grundidee und Charakter der göttlichen Komödie von Dante Alighieri" (Bonn, 1876);
- "Die Theologie der göttlichen Komödie des Dante Alighieri in ihren Grundzügen dargestellt" (Cologne, 1879);
- "Die göttliche Komödie des Dante Alighieri nach ihrem wesentlichen Inhalt und Charakter dargestellt. Ein Beitrag zu deren Würdigung und Verständniss" (Freiburg, 1880; 2nd ed., 1889, tr. by Father Sebastian Bowden as "Dante's Divina Commedia, Its Scope and Value", London, 1887);
- "De theologiæ speculativæ ac mysticæ connubio in Dantis præsertim trilogiâ" (Würzburg, 1882);
- "Dante und Beatrice" (Frankfort, 1883);
- "Dantes Geistesgang" (Cologne, 1888).

To the domain of practical theology belong:

- "Aphorismen über Predigt und Prediger" (Freiburg, 1888; 2nd ed., edited by P. Hüls, 1907)
- "Timotheus. Briefe an einen jungen Theologen" (Freiburg, 1890; the following editions prepared by Albert Ehrhard: 2nd ed., 1897; 3rd ed., 1909; also tr. into Spanish and English, Freiburg, 1901 and 1902).

Lesser writings:

- "Das Priesterthum der katholischen Kirche. Primizpredigten" (Ratisbon, 1851; 2nd ed. edited by Eugen Müller, 1897);
- "Die kirchlichen und socialen Zustände von Paris" (Mainz, 1852);
- "Die Idee der geistlichen Uebungen nach dem Plane des hl. Ignatius von Loyola" (Ratisbon, 1853; 2nd ed. prepared by Rudolf Handmann, S.J., 1908);
- "Herr, den du liebst, der ist krank. Ein Kranken- und Trostbuch" (Würzburg, 1855, 3rd ed., 1878; 5th ed., 1904);
- "Die Liturgie der Kirche und die lateinische Sprache" (Würzburg, 1856);
- "Der Organismus der Universitätswissenschaften und die Stellung der Theologie in demselben" (rectoral discourse, Würzburg, 1862);
- "Die Kunst im Christenthum" (rectoral discourse, Würzburg, 1867);
- "Die kirchliche Vollgewalt des apostolischen Stuhles" (Freiburg, 1873; 2nd ed., 1887);
- "Der kleine Kempis, Brosamen aus den meist unbekannten Schriften des Thomas von Kempis" (Freiburg, 1874; 2nd ed., 1900);
- "David Friedrich Strauss. Ein Lebens- und Literaturbild" (Freiburg, 1875);
- "Thomas von Aquin und die europäische Civilisation" (Frankfort, 1880);
- "Die 'Krisis des Christenthums', Protestantismus und katholische Kirche" (Freiburg, 1881);
- "Dreifaches Lehramt. Gedächtnissrede auf Denzinger" (Freiburg, 1883).

Numerous treatises and some longer essays, which were partly preparations for his great works, were published by Hettinger in various reviews: "Katholische Wochenschrift" (Würzburg, 1853–56); "Katholik" (1860–62); "Chilianeum" (Würzburg, 1862–69); "Oesterreichische Vierteljahresschrift für katholische Theologie" (1865); "Historisch-politische Blätter" (1874–90); "Theologisch-praktische Quartalschrift" (Linz, 1881–87, 1889–90). "Gutachten der theologischen Facultät der k. Julius-Maximilians-Universität in Würzburg über fünf ihr vorgelegte Fragen das bevorstehende ökumenische Concil in Rom betreffend" (printed in "Chilianeum", New Series, Vol. II, 1869, pp. 258–307; and separately, Würzburg, 1870) was written jointly by Hettinger and Hergenröther, the former being the author of the parts concerning dogma, and the latter, of the historico-canonical matter.
