= Wetzer-Welte Kirchenlexikon =

Encyclopedic work of Catholic biography, history, and theology

Wetzer and Welte's Kirchenlexikon is an encyclopedic work of Catholic biography, history, and theology, first compiled by Heinrich Joseph Wetzer and Benedict Welte. The first edition in 12 volumes was published from 1847 to 1860, by Verlag Herder.

Another edition, edited by Joseph Hergenröther and Franz Philip Kaulen and subtitled Encylopädie der katholischen Theologie und ihrer Hülfswissenschaften, was published in Freiburg from 1882 through 1903.

== Bibliography ==
- Holweck, F. G., A Biographical Dictionary of the Saints. St. Louis, MO: B. Herder Book Co. 1924.
