= Heinrich Joseph Wetzer =

German scholar

- Born: 19 March 1801; Anzefahr, Hesse-Kassel, Holy Roman Empire
- Died: 5 November 1853 (aged 52); Freiburg im Breisgau, Baden

Academic work
- Discipline: Orientalism

Heinrich Joseph Wetzer (Anzefahr, Hesse-Kassel (or Hesse-Cassel), 19 March 1801 – Freiburg, Baden, 5 November 1853) was a German Orientalist. His greatest achievement was the part he took in the production of the first edition of the Kirchenlexikon for which he drew up the Nomenclator and which he edited with Benedict Welte.

He studied theology and Semitic languages at the universities of Marburg (1820-3), Tübingen (1823), and Freiburg (1824), and graduated as doctor of theology and philosophy at Freiburg in 1824. He continued the study of Arabic, Persian and Syriac for eighteen months at the University of Paris, under the Orientalists De Sacy and Etienne Marc Quatremère.

== Career ==
At the royal library of Paris he discovered an Arabian manuscript containing the history of the Coptic Christians in Egypt from their origin to the fourteenth century, which he afterwards edited in Arabic and Latin: "Taki-eddini Makrizii historia Coptorum Christianorum in Ægypto" (Sulzbach, 1828).

In 1828, Wetzer became professor-extraordinary, and in 1830 professor-ordinary, of Oriental philology at the University of Freiburg. Wetzer's interest in preserving the Catholic character of Freiburg, which had been founded and endowed as a Catholic university, incurred for him the odium of the Protestant professors, who, in the majority from 1846, excluded him from all academic positions. In 1850, Wetzer was appointed chief librarian of the university library.

Wetzer composed anonymously the little work "Die Universität Freiburg nach ihrem Ursprunge..." (Freiburg, 1844). He had also begun a history of the controversy between Arianism and the Catholic Church in the fourth century, but only a small part of it was completed and published as "Restitutio verae chronologiae rerum ex controversiis Arianis, inde ab anno 325 usque ad annum 350 exortarum..." (Frankfort, 1827).
