= Benedict Welte =

German Catholic exegete

Benedict Welte (Ratzenried, Württemberg, 25 November 1825 – 27 May 1885, Rottenburg am Neckar) was a German Catholic exegete.

After studying at Tübingen and Bonn, where he made special studies in the exegesis of the Old Testament and in Semitic languages, he was ordained priest when twenty-eight years old. Soon after this he became assistant lecturer at Tübingen, and in 1840 regular professor of Old Testament exegesis.

== Works ==
He published at Freiburg, in 1840, Historisch-kritische Enleitung in die hl. Schriften des alten Testamentes. Much of the material for this work had been gathered by his predecessor, Johann Georg Herbst, who left a request that Welte should finish and edit his notes. Welte was not in fact in sympathy with the method of Herbst; and at times found it necessary to append his own views and arguments. The second part of the same work began to appear in 1842. Two years later, a third volume, completing the task, published as Specielle Einleitung in die deutero-canonischen Bucher des alten Testamentes came from the pen of Welte alone.

Before this, in 1841, the translation of Gorium's Armenian biography of St. Mesrob appeared in the university annual publication. In the same year he wrote Nachmosaisches im Pentateuch, contending that there was no post-Mosaic matter in the Pentateuch. His explanation and translation of the Book of Job was published at Freiburg, 1849.

Meanwhile, in company with the orientalist Heinrich Joseph Wetzer, he had begun his real life-work. Together they edited the 12 volumes of the Kirchenlexikon, an encyclopedia of Catholic theology and its allied sciences. To this work Welte himself contributed 200 articles, and his literary activity closed with the completion of the encyclopedia. This was due partly to the duties of a canon's office which he assumed, 22 May 1857, at the cathedral of Rottenburg am Neckar, and partly to an incurable disease of the eyes.
