= List of Catholic philosophers and theologians =

This is a list of Catholic philosophers and theologians whose Catholicism is important to their works. Their names are ordered chronologically from earliest to latest in time based on their dates of birth.

To make for easier reading, this list of philosophers are subdivided into various philosophical movements and time periods based on the dates they were philosophically active (For example: Nicholas Malabranche is categorized here as a "1660-1914 Enlightenment and Colonial era philosopher" as he wrote his seminal work "Concerning the Search after Truth" in 1674) in order to give a rough sense of influence between thinkers.

== Patristic Philosophers (c. 30-476) ==
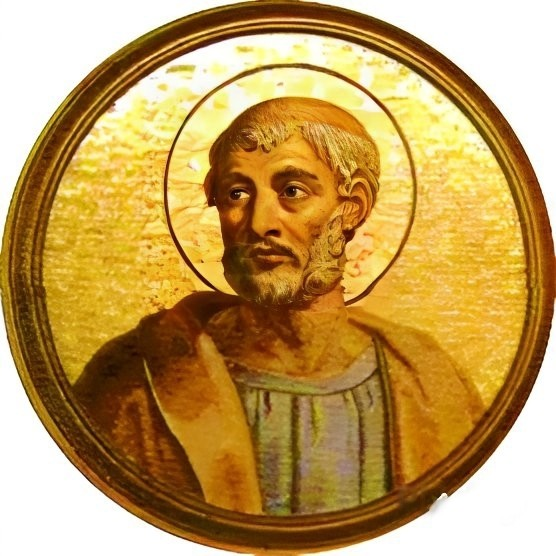
Clement of Rome

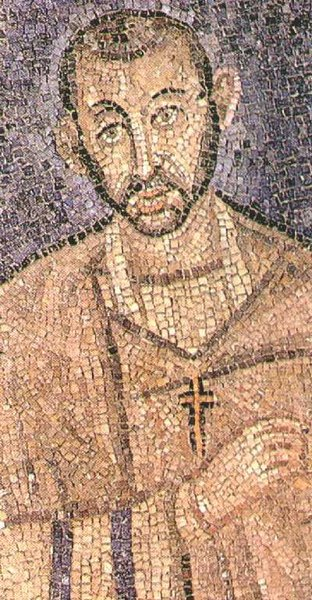
Ambrose of Milan

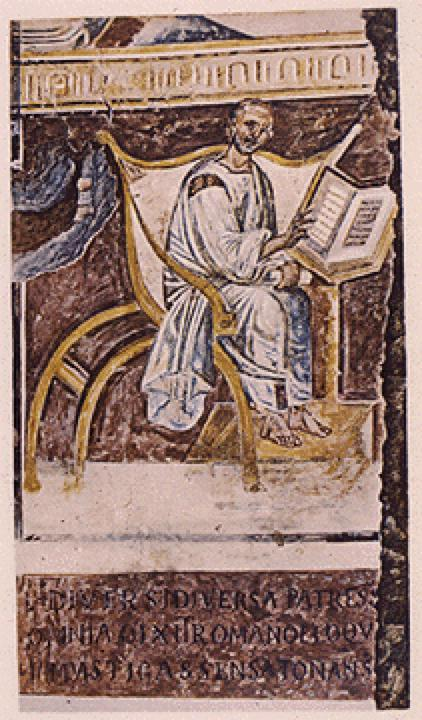
Augustine of Hippo

- Ignatius of Antioch (c. 35/50 – between 98 and 110)
- Papias of Hierapolis (c. 60 – c. 163)
- Polycarp of Smyrna (c. 69 – c. 155)
- Justin Martyr (100–165)
- Irenaeus (130–202)
- Clement of Rome (died 99)
- Clement of Alexandria (150–215)
- Tertullian (155–222)
- Origen of Alexandria (184–253)
- Cyprian of Carthage (200–258)
- Aphrahat (270–345)
- Athanasius of Alexandria (296–373)
- Hillary of Poitiers (300–368)
- Ephrem the Syrian (306–373)
- Basil of Caesarea (329–379)
- Gregory Nazianzus (329–390)
- Gregory of Nyssa (335–395)
- Ambrose (340–397)
- Jerome (347–420)
- John Chrysostom (347–407)
- Augustine of Hippo (354–430)
- Cyril of Alexandria (378–444)
- Isaac of Antioch (451–452)

== Early Medieval Philosophers (c.476-1000) ==
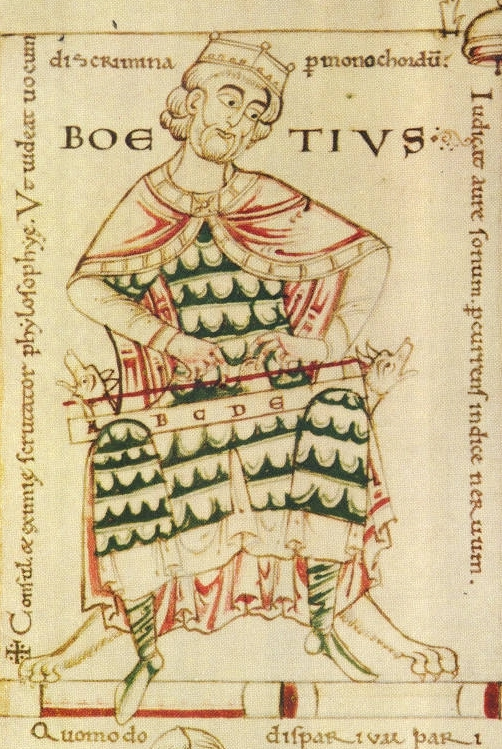
Boethius

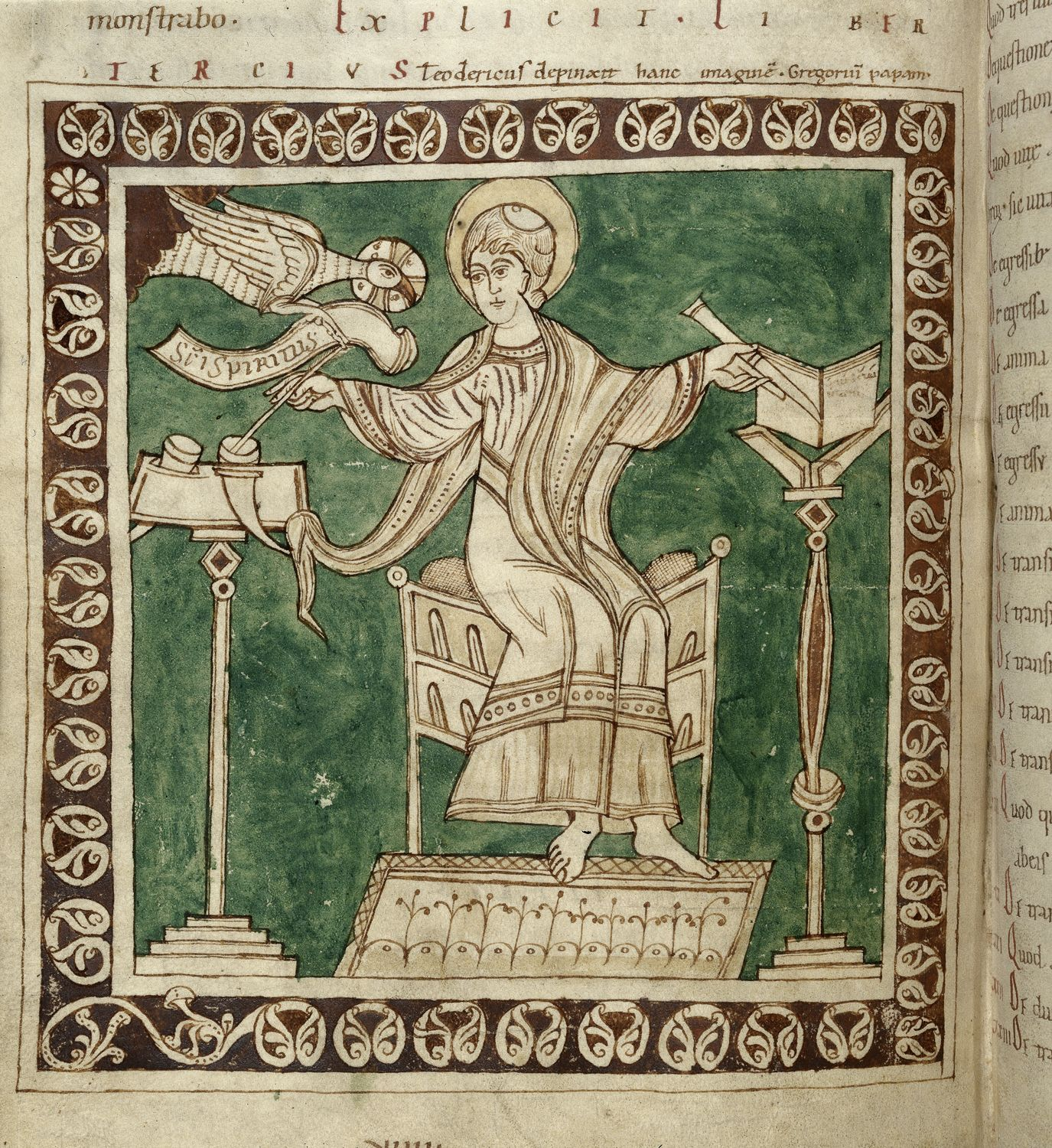
Gregory the Great

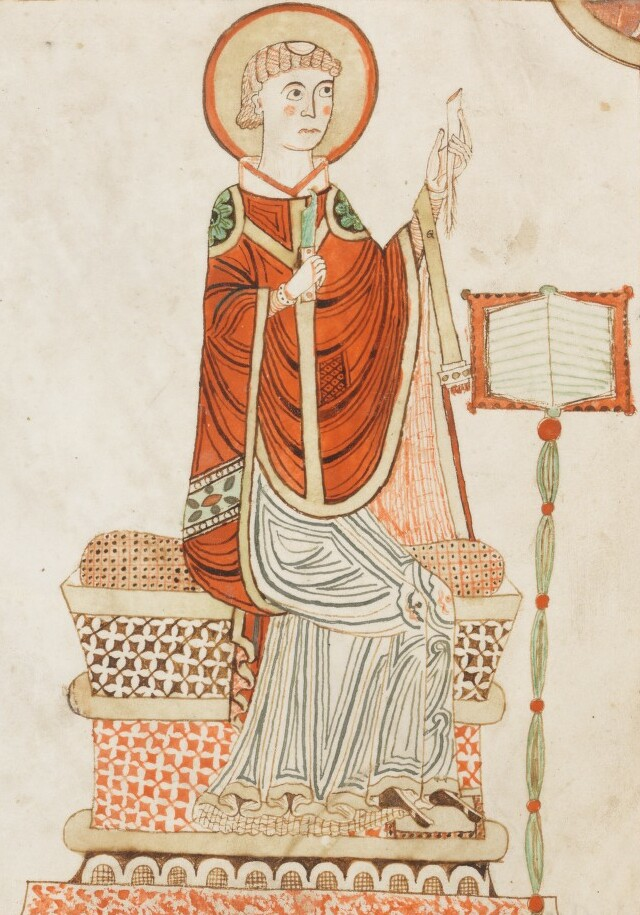
Bede the Venerable

- Boethius (477–524)
- Pope Gregory I (540–604)
- Isidore of Seville (560–636)
- Maximus the Confessor (580–662)
- Bede (672/3–735)
- John of Damascus (675/6–749)
- Radbertus (785–865)
- John Scotus Eriugena (800–877)

== Scholastic Philosophers (c.1000-1492) ==
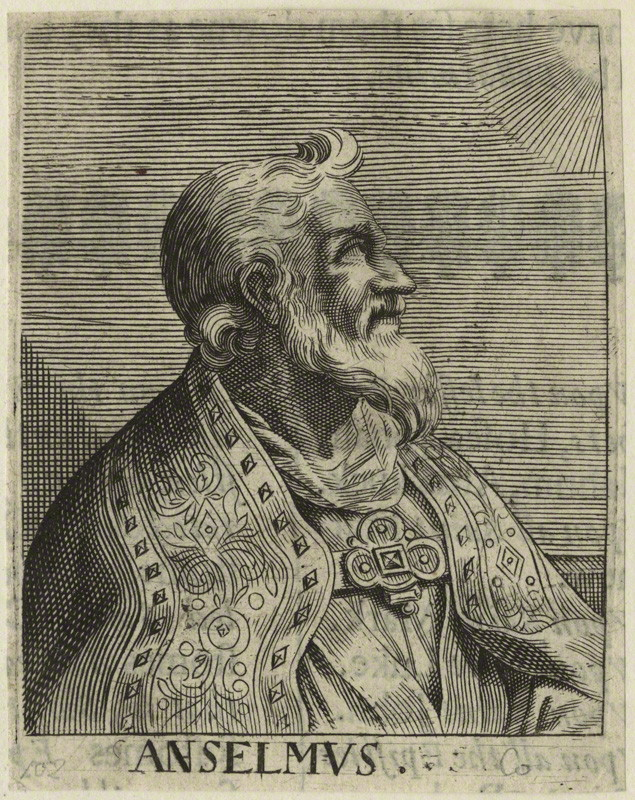
Anselm

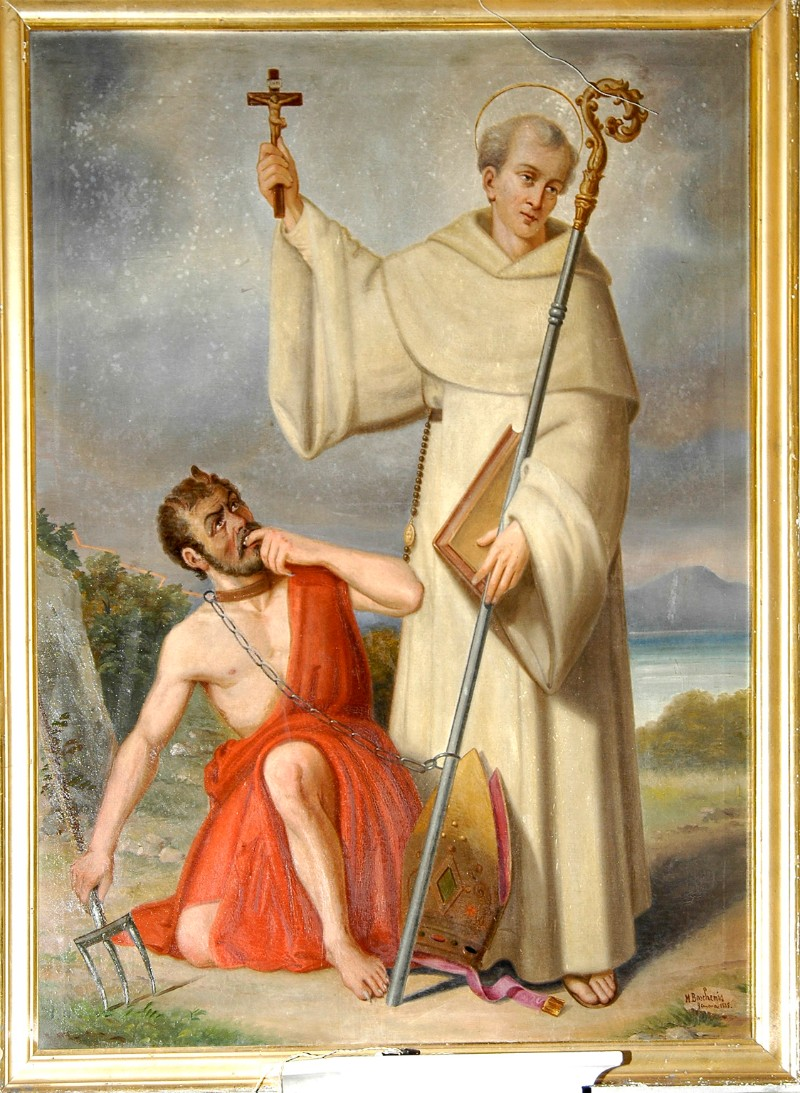
Bernard of Clairvaux

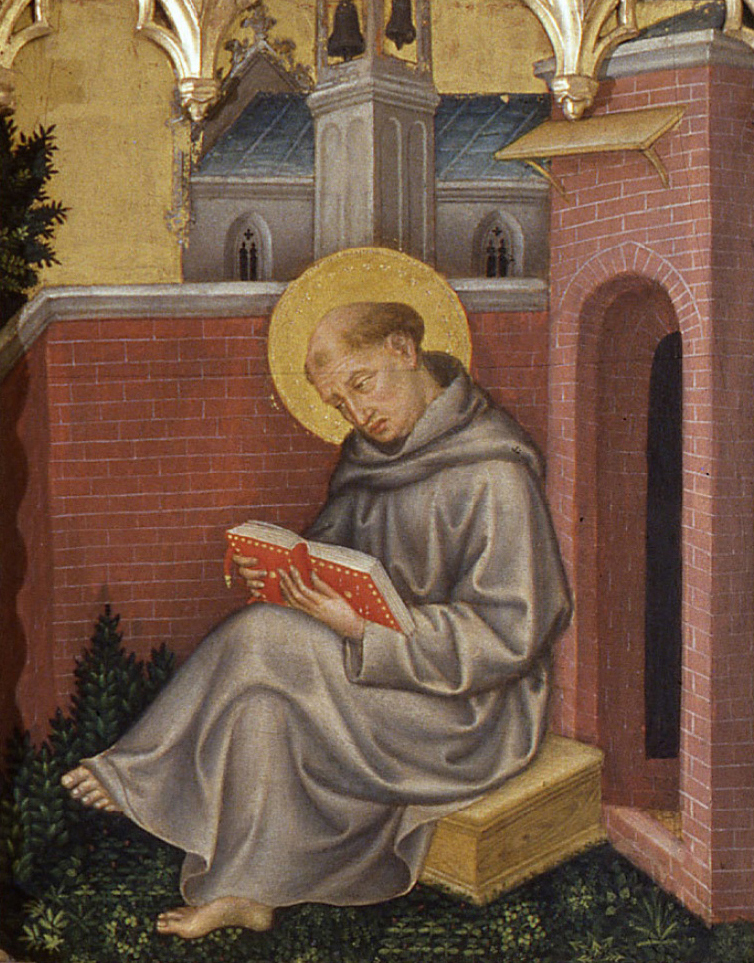
Thomas Aquinas

- Anselm of Canterbury (1033/4–1109)
- Peter Abelard (1079–1142)
- Adelard of Bath (1080–1152)
- Bernard of Clairvaux (1090–1153)
- Hugh of Saint Victor (1096–1141)
- Peter Lombard (1096–1160)
- Hildegard of Bingen (1098–1179)
- Héloïse (1100/1–1163/4)
- John of Salisbury (c. 1110–1180)
- Robert Grosseteste (1175–1253)
- Francis of Assisi (1181/2–1226)
- Alexander of Hales (1185–1245)
- Albertus Magnus (1193–1280)
- Henry of Ghent (1217–1293)
- Roger Bacon (1219/20–1292)
- Bonaventure (1221–1274)
- Thomas Aquinas (1225–1274)
- Ramon Llull (1232–1315)
- Giles of Rome (1243–1316)
- Godfrey of Fontaines (1250–1306/9)
- James of Viterbo (1255–1307)
- Gertrude of Helfta (1256–1302)
- Meister Eckhart (1260–1328)
- Dante Alighieri (1265–1321)
- John Duns Scotus (1266–1308)
- William of Alnwick (1275–1333)
- William of Ockham (1287–1347)
- William of Ware (1290–1305)
- Henry Suso (1295–1366)
- Jean Buridan (1300–1358/61)
- Bridget of Sweden (1303–1373)
- Albert of Saxony (1320–1390)
- Nicole Oresme (1325–1382)
- Catherine of Siena (1347–1380)
- Jean Gerson (1363–1429)
- John Capreolus (1380–1444)

== Renaissance and Counter Reformation Philosophers (c.1492-1660) ==
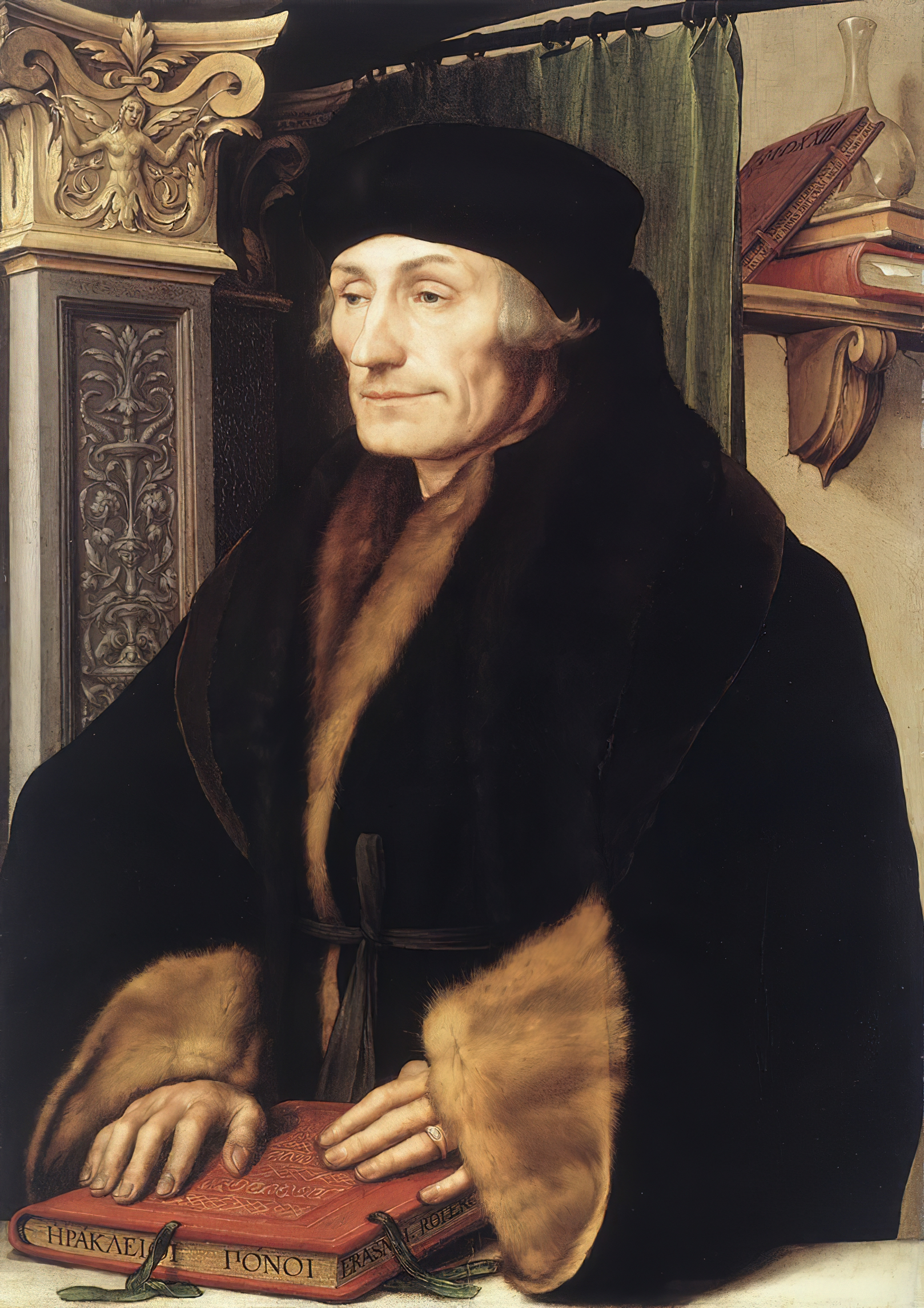
Erasmus

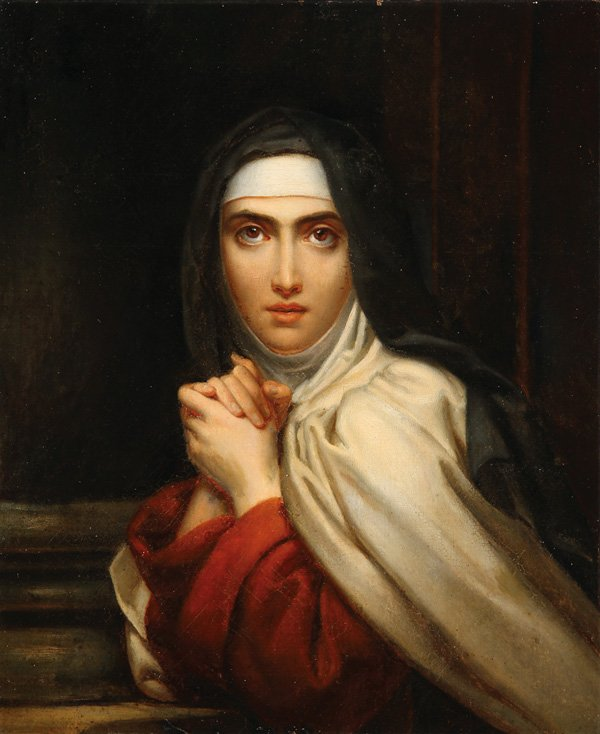
Theresa of Ávila

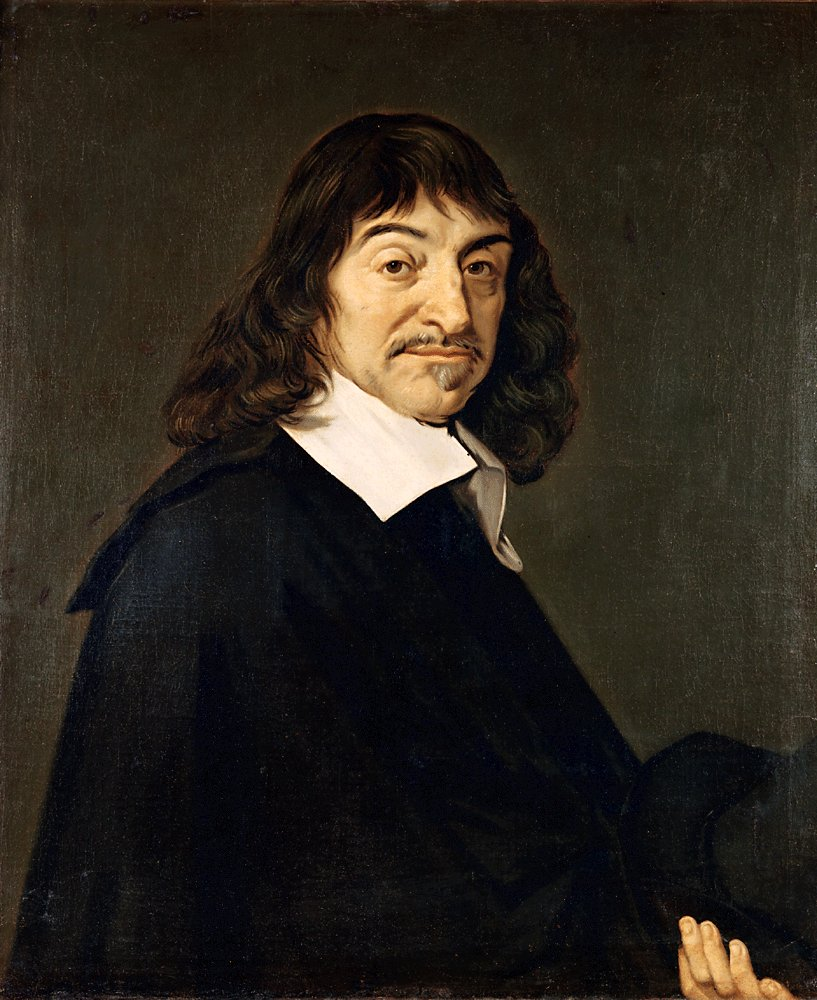
René Descartes

- Sylvester Mazzolini (1456/7–1527)
- Giovanni Pico della Mirandola (1463–1494)
- Desiderius Erasmus (1466–1536)
- John Mair (1467–1550)
- Thomas Cajetan (1469–1534)
- Francesco Silvestri (1474–1528)
- Thomas More (1478–1535)
- John Fisher (1469–1535)
- Nicolaus Copernicus (1473–1543)
- Francisco de Vitoria (1483–1546)
- Ignatius of Loyola (1491–1556)
- Peter Faber (1506–1546)
- Teresa of Ávila (1515–1582)
- Michel de Montaigne (1533–1592)
- Domingo Báñez (1528–1604)
- Franciscus Patricius (1529–1597)
- Luis de Molina (1535–1600)
- John of the Cross (1542–1591)
- Robert Bellarmine (1542–1621)
- Justus Lipsius (1547–1606)
- Francisco Suárez (1548–1617)
- Lawrence of Brindisi (1559–1619)
- Francis de Sales (1567-1622)
- Péter Pázmány (1570–1637)
- John of St. Thomas (John Poinsot) (1589–1644)
- Michael Wadding (1591–1644)
- René Descartes (1596–1650)
- Blaise Pascal (1623–1662)
- Matthias Tanner (1630–1692)

== Enlightenment and Colonial Era Philosophers (c.1660-1914) ==
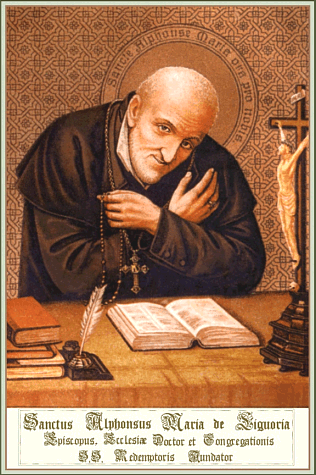
Alphonsus Liguori

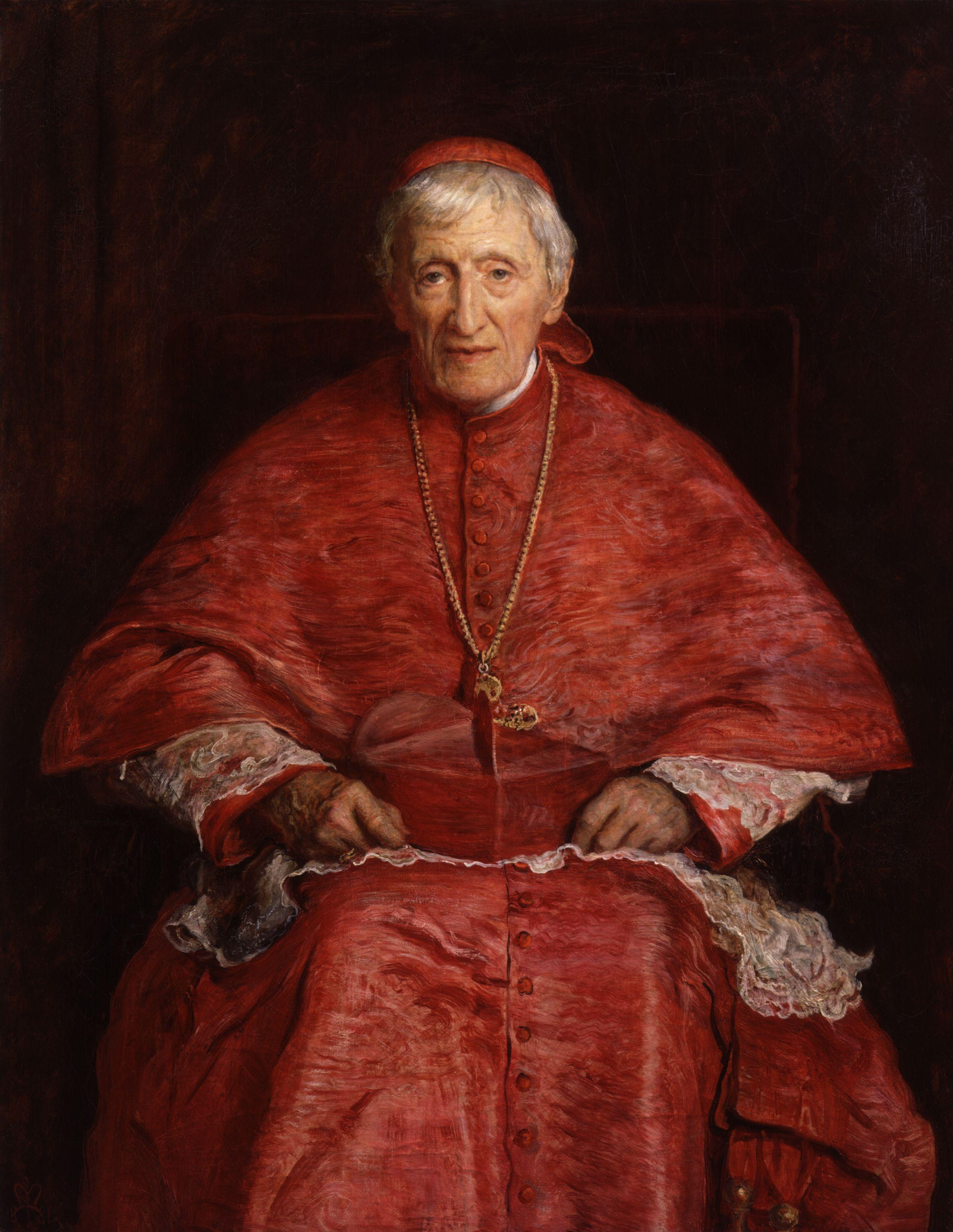
Portrait of Newman by John Everett Millais, 1881

Max Scheler

- Nicolas Malebranche (1638–1715)
- Noel Alexandre (1639–1724)
- Giambattista Vico (1668–1744)
- Giovanni Battista Scaramelli (1687–1752)
- Peter Dens (1690–1775)
- Alphonsus Liguori (1696–1787)
- Febronius (Johann Nikolaus von Hontheim) (1701–1790)
- Francesco Antonio Zaccaria (1714–1795)
- Patrick Benedict Zimmer (1752–1820)
- Joseph de Maistre (1753–1821)
- Franz Xaver von Baader (1765–1841)
- Georg Hermes (1775–1831)
- Hughes Felicité Robert de Lamennais (1782–1854)
- Anton Günther(1783–1863)
- Izidor Guzmics (1786–1839)
- Gioacchino Ventura di Raulica (1792–1861)
- Luigi Taparelli (1793–1862)
- Antonio Rosmini-Serbati (1797–1855)
- Francis Xavier Patrizi (1797–1881)
- Franz Anton Staudenmaier (1800–1856)
- John Henry Newman (1801–1890)
- Nicholas Wiseman (1802–1865)
- Félix Dupanloup (1802–1878)
- Jean-Baptiste Henri Lacordaire (1802–1861)
- Orestes Brownson (1803–1876)
- Alexis de Tocqueville (1805–1859)
- Auguste Joseph Alphonse Gratry (1805–1872)
- Giuseppe Pecci (1807–1890)
- Karl Josef von Hefele (1809–1893)
- Jaime Balmes (1810–1848)
- Pope Leo XIII (Vincenzo Gioacchino Raffaele Luigi Pecci) (1810–1903)
- Joseph Kleutgen (1811–1883)
- Louis Veuillot (1813–1883)
- Frederick William Faber (1814–1863)
- Franz Jakob Clemens (1815–1862)
- Valentin Gröne (1817–1882)
- John Dobree Dalgairns (1818–1876)
- Gregor Mendel (1822–1884)
- Augusta Theodosia Drane (1823–1894)
- Nicholas-Joseph Laforêt (1823–1872)
- Albert Stöckl (1823–1895)
- Joseph Hergenröther (1824–1890)
- Charles Émile Freppel (1827–1891)
- Constantine von Schäzler (1827–1880)
- Ernest Hello (1828–1885)
- Henry Nutcombe Oxenham (1829–1888)
- Tommaso Maria Zigliara (1833–1893)
- Franz Brentano (1838–1917)
- Léon Ollé-Laprune (1839–1898)
- Caspar Isenkrahe (1844–1921)
- Henry Denifle (1844–1905)
- Aloisio Galea (1851–1905)
- Marcelino Menéndez y Pelayo (1856–1912)
- Maurice Blondel (1861–1949)
- Antonin Sertillanges (1863–1948)
- Miguel de Unamuno (1864-1936)
- Henri Brémond (1865–1933)
- Maurice De Wulf (1867–1947)
- Paul Claudel (1868–1955)
- Aleš Ušeničnik (1868–1952)
- Hilaire Belloc (1870–1953)
- Charles Peguy (1873–1914)

== Modern Philosophers (c.1914-present) ==
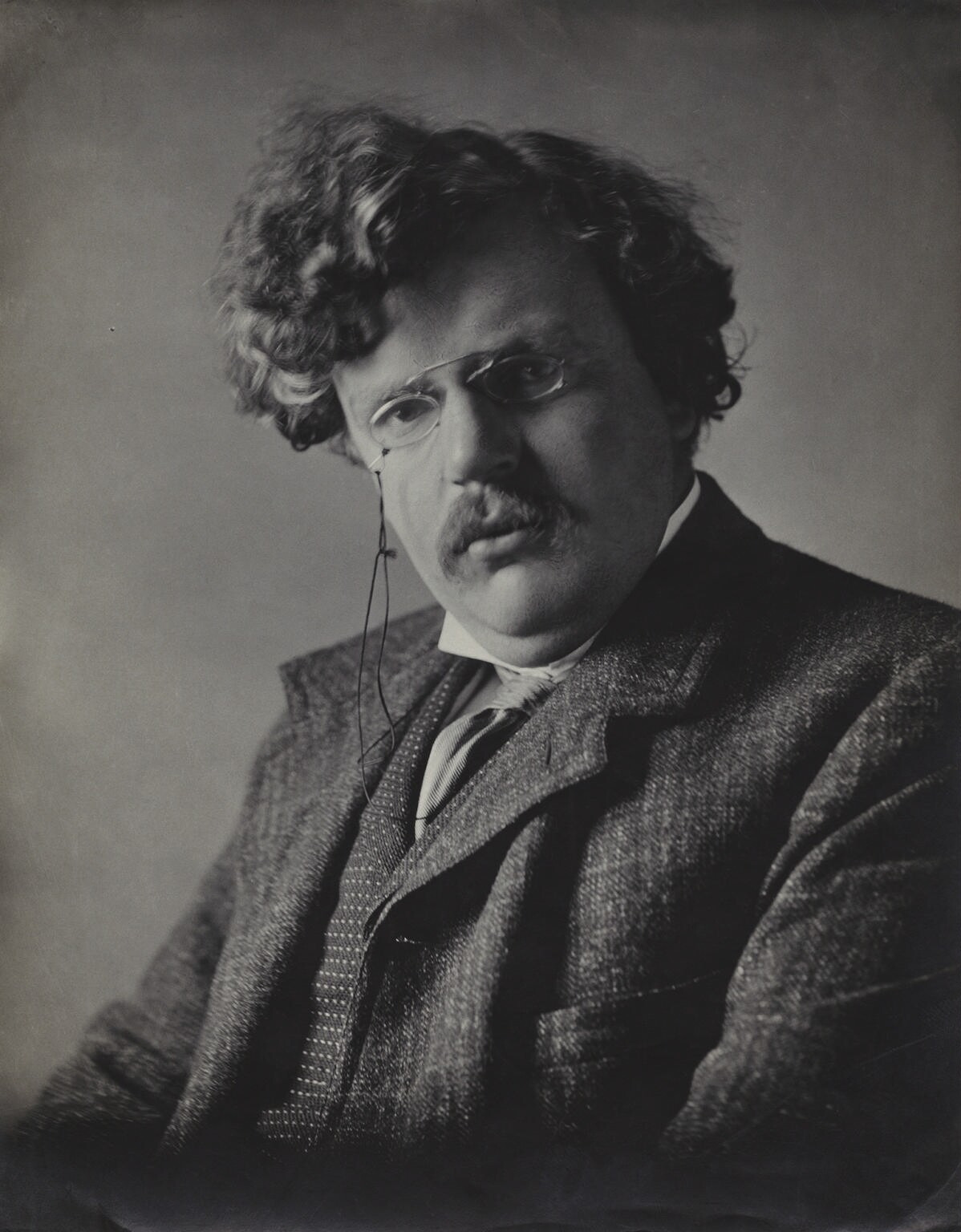
G.K Chesterton

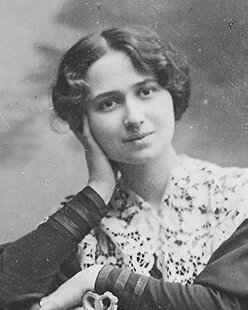
Raïssa Maritain

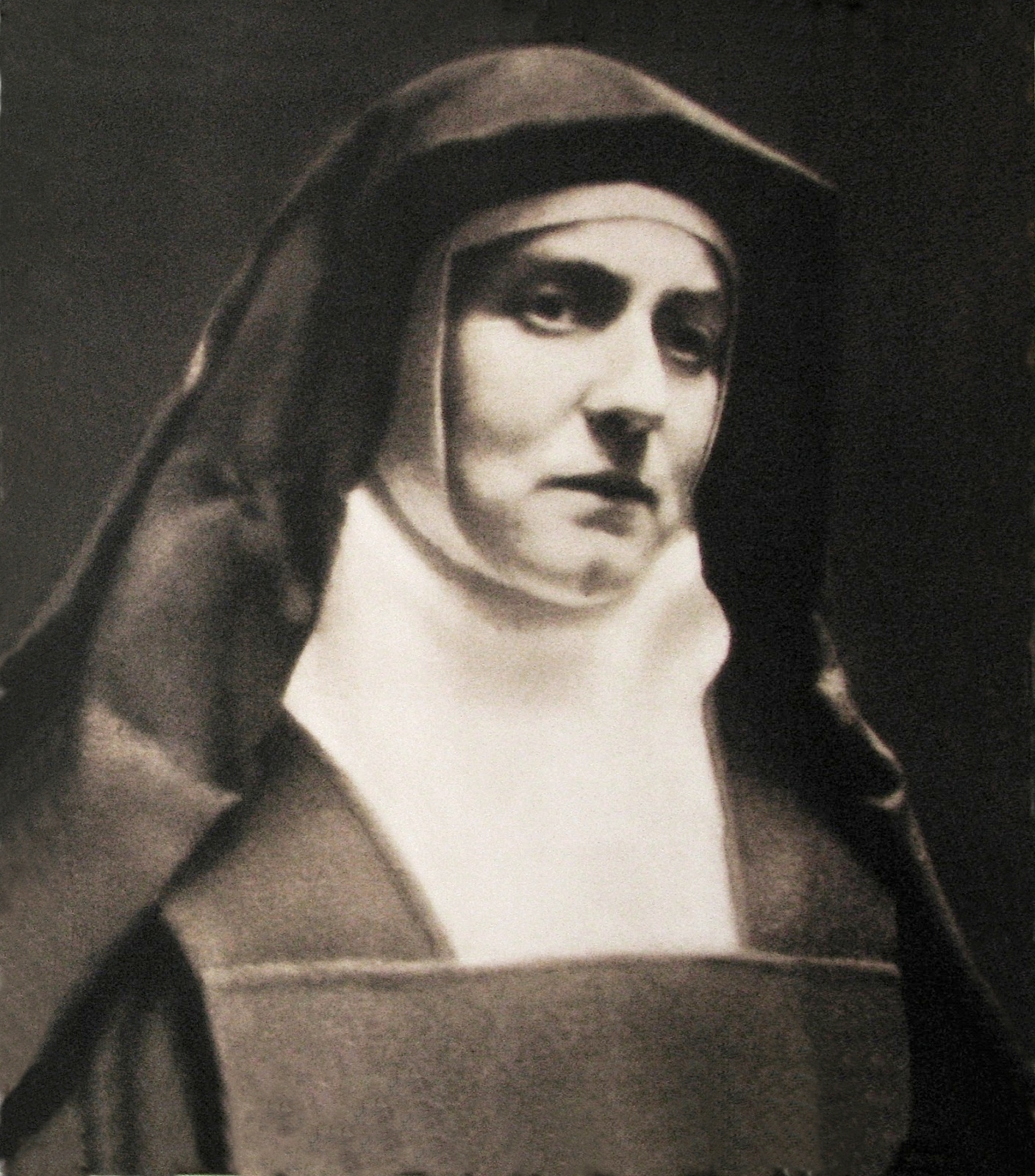
Edith Stein

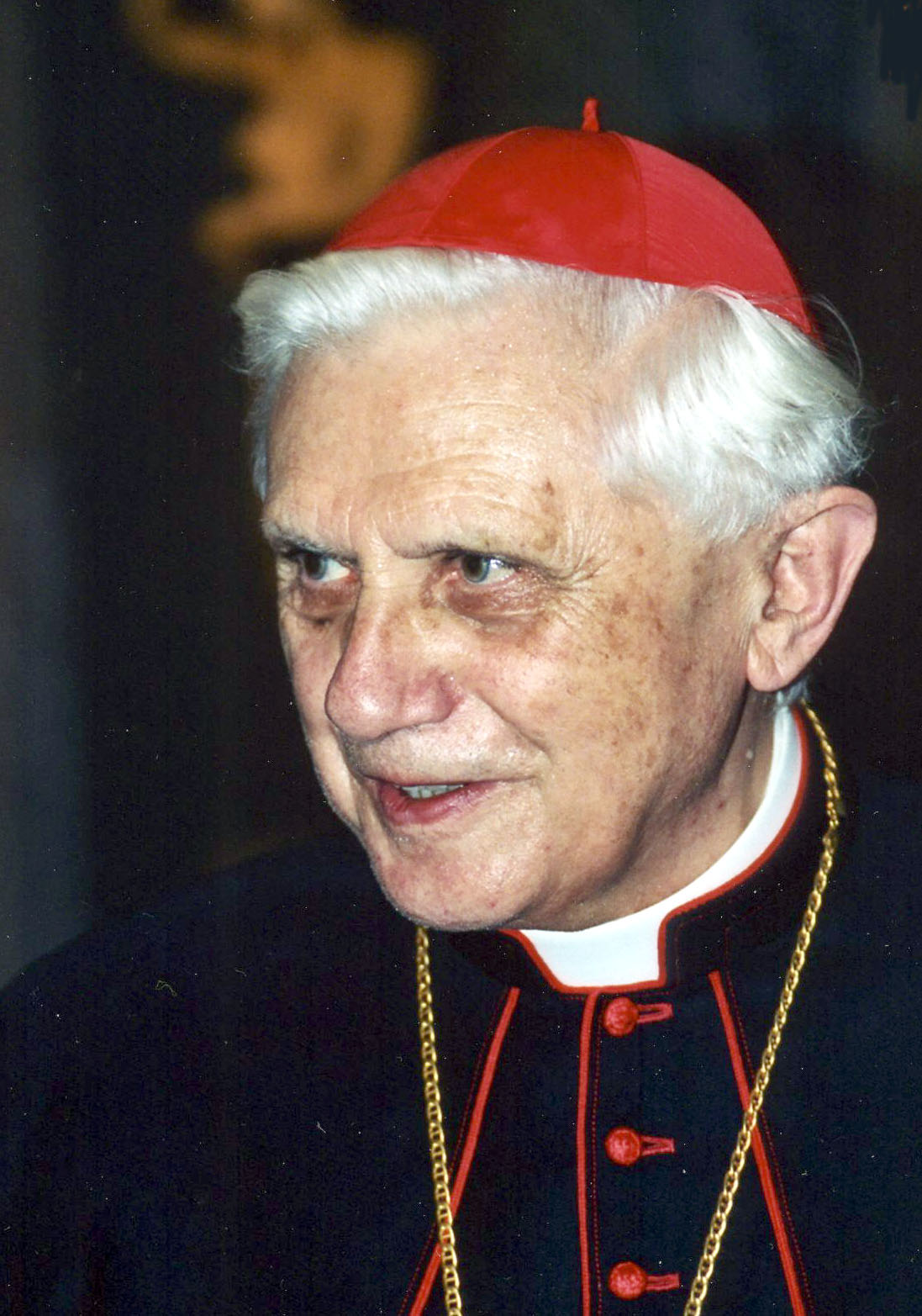
Benedict XVI

- Vyacheslav Ivanov (1866–1949)
- G.K. Chesterton (1874–1936)
- Max Scheler (1874–1928)
- Reginald Garrigou-Lagrange (1877–1964)
- Pierre Teilhard de Chardin (1881–1955)
- Jacques Maritain (1882–1973)
- Rudolf Allers (1883–1963)
- Raïssa Maritain (1883–1960)
- Étienne Gilson (1884–1978)
- Romano Guardini (1885–1968)
- François Mauriac (1885-1970)
- Ronald Knox (1888–1957)
- Erich Przywara (1889–1972)
- Gabriel Marcel (1889–1973)
- Martin Heidegger (1889–1976)
- Ludwig Wittgenstein (1889-1951)
- Dietrich von Hildebrand (1889–1977)
- Oswald von Nell-Breuning (1890–1991)
- Charles Journet (1891–1975)
- Edith Stein (1891–1942)
- Michael Polanyi (1891–1976)
- Fulton Sheen (1895–1979)
- Henri de Lubac (1896–1991)
- Xavier Zubiri (1898–1983)
- Austin Woodbury (1899–1979)
- František Tomášek (1899–1992)
- Heinrich Schlier (1900–1978)
- Jean Guitton (1901–1999)
- Mortimer Jerome Adler, converted to Catholicism in 2000 (1902–2001)
- Christopher Butler (1902–1986)
- Józef Maria Bocheński (1902–1995)
- Malcolm Muggeridge (1903–1990)
- Yves Simon (1903–1961)
- Evelyn Waugh (1903–1966)
- Graham Greene (1904–1991)
- Josef Pieper (1904–1997)
- John Courtney Murray (1904–1967)
- Karl Rahner (1904–1984)
- Yves Congar (1904–1995)
- Osvaldo Lira (1904–1996)
- Bernard Lonergan (1904–1984)
- Jean Danielou (1905–1974)
- Emmanuel Mounier (1905–1950)
- Hans Urs von Balthasar (1905–1988)
- Friedrich-Carl Henckel von Donnersmarck (1905–1989)
- Charles De Koninck (1906–1965)
- Frederick Copleston (1907–1994)
- Bernard Philip Kelly (1907–1958)
- Bernard O'Brien (1907–1982)
- Olivier Messiaen (1908–1992)
- Plinio Corrêa de Oliveira (1908–1995)
- Hélder Câmara (1909–1999)
- Augusto Del Noce (1910–1989)
- Cornelio Fabro (1911–1995)
- Marshall McLuhan (1911–1980)
- E. F. Schumacher (1911–1977)
- Anna Terruwe (1911–2004)
- George Duggan (1912–2012)
- Karel Vladimir Truhlar (1912–1977)
- Walter J. Ong (1912–2003)
- Nicolás Gómez Dávila (1913–1994)
- R. C. Zaehner (1913–1974)
- Louis Bouyer (1913–2004)
- Edward Schillebeeckx (1914–2009)
- John Hardon (1914–2000)
- Thomas Berry (1914–2009)
- W. Norris Clarke (1915–2008)
- Thomas Merton (1915–1968)
- Vincent Miceli (1915–1991)
- Peter Geach (1916–2013)
- Walker Percy (1916–1990)
- Avery Dulles (1918–2008)
- G. E. M. Anscombe (1919–2001)
- Conrad Baars (1919–1981)
- Emerich Coreth (1919–2006)
- Karol Wojtyła (Pope St. John Paul II) (1920–2005)
- Joseph Fitzmyer (1920–2016)
- Catharina Halkes (1920–2011)
- Milan Komar (1921–2006)
- Thomas Molnar (1921–2010)
- Xavier Tilliette (1921–2018)
- Michel Henry (1922–2002)
- Leslie Dewart (1922–2009)
- Jean Delumeau (1923–2020)
- Jacques Dupuis (1923–2004)
- Ernest Fortin (1923–2002)
- Vekoslav Grmič (1923–2005)
- René Girard (1923–2015)
- Gregory Baum (1923–2017)
- Alice von Hildebrand (1923–2022)
- Roque Ferriols (1924–2021)
- Michel de Certeau (1925–1986)
- Michael Dummett (1925–2011)
- Louis Dupre (1925–2022)
- Flannery O'Connor (1925–1964)
- Servais Pinckaers (1925–2008)
- Juan Luis Segundo (1925–1996)
- Ivan Illich (1926–2002)
- Leonardo Polo (1926–2013)
- Robert Bork (1927–2012)
- Robert Spaemann (1927–2018)
- Joseph Ratzinger (Pope Benedict XVI) (1927–2022)
- James V. Schall (1928–2019)
- Raymond E. Brown (1928–1998)
- Gustavo Gutiérrez (1928–2024)
- Hans Kung (1928–2021)
- William E. May (1928–2014)
- Jean Vanier (1928–2019)
- Nicholas Rescher (1928–2024)
- Magdalena Villaba (1928–2023)
- Ralph McInerny (1929–2010)
- Alasdair MacIntyre (1929–2025)
- Germain Grisez (1929–2018)
- Ignacio Ellacuría (1930–1989)
- Joseph A. Bracken (1930–2024)
- C. J. F. Williams (1930–1997)
- Wolfgang Smith (1932–2024)
- Charles Taylor (1931–)
- Fergus Kerr (1931–)
- Ferdinand Ulrich (1931–2020)
- Joseph de Torre (1932–2018)
- Henri Nouwen (1932–1996)
- Paul Virilio (1932–2018)
- Walter Kasper (1933–)
- Joan Chittister (1936–)
- Michal Heller (1936–)
- John Rist (1936–)
- Richard John Neuhaus (1936–2009)
- Antonin Scalia (1936–2016)
- Peter Kreeft (1937–)
- Leonardo Boff (1938–)
- Jon Sobrino (1938–)
- Mariano Artigas (1938–2006)
- Elisabeth Schussler Fiorenza (1938–)
- David Tracy (1939–2025)
- Joseph A. Komonchak (1939–)
- John Finnis (1940–)
- Bas van Fraassen (1941–)
- Angelo Scola (1941–)
- Elizabeth A. Johnson (1941–)
- John P. Meier (1942–2022)
- Jacek Salij (1942–)
- Ada Maria Isasi-Diaz (1943–2012)
- Jean-Luc Marion (1946–)
- Thomas Weinandy (1946–)
- Chantal Delsol (1947–)
- Olavo de Carvalho (1947–2022)
- Eleonore Stump (1947–)
- Mary Shawn Copeland (1947–)
- Bruno Latour (1947–2022)
- Tomáš Halík (1948–)
- Aidan Nichols (1948–)
- Martin Rhonheimer (1950–)
- William Desmond (1951–)
- J. Budziszewski (1952–)
- Cyril O'Regan (1952–)
- Catherine LaCugna (1952–1997)
- John Joseph Haldane (1954–)
- Tina Beattie (1955–)
- Robert P. George (1955–)
- William Sweet (1955–)
- Robert C. Koons (1957–)
- Marie-Jo Thiel (1957–)
- Gavin D'Costa (1958–)
- Robert Barron (1959–)
- Byung-Chul Han (1959–)
- Yves-Marie Adeline (1960–)
- David Oderberg (1963–)
- Helen Alford (1964–)
- Hector Zagal (1966–)
- Józef Stala (1966–2025)
- Denis Moreau (1967–)
- Agbonkhianmeghe Orobator (1967)
- Edward Feser (1968–)
- Alexander R. Pruss (1973-)
- Ulrich L. Lehner (1976–)

== See also ==
- List of Catholic authors
- Doctors of the Church
