= Churches Militant, Penitent, and Triumphant =

Traditional divisions of the Christian Church

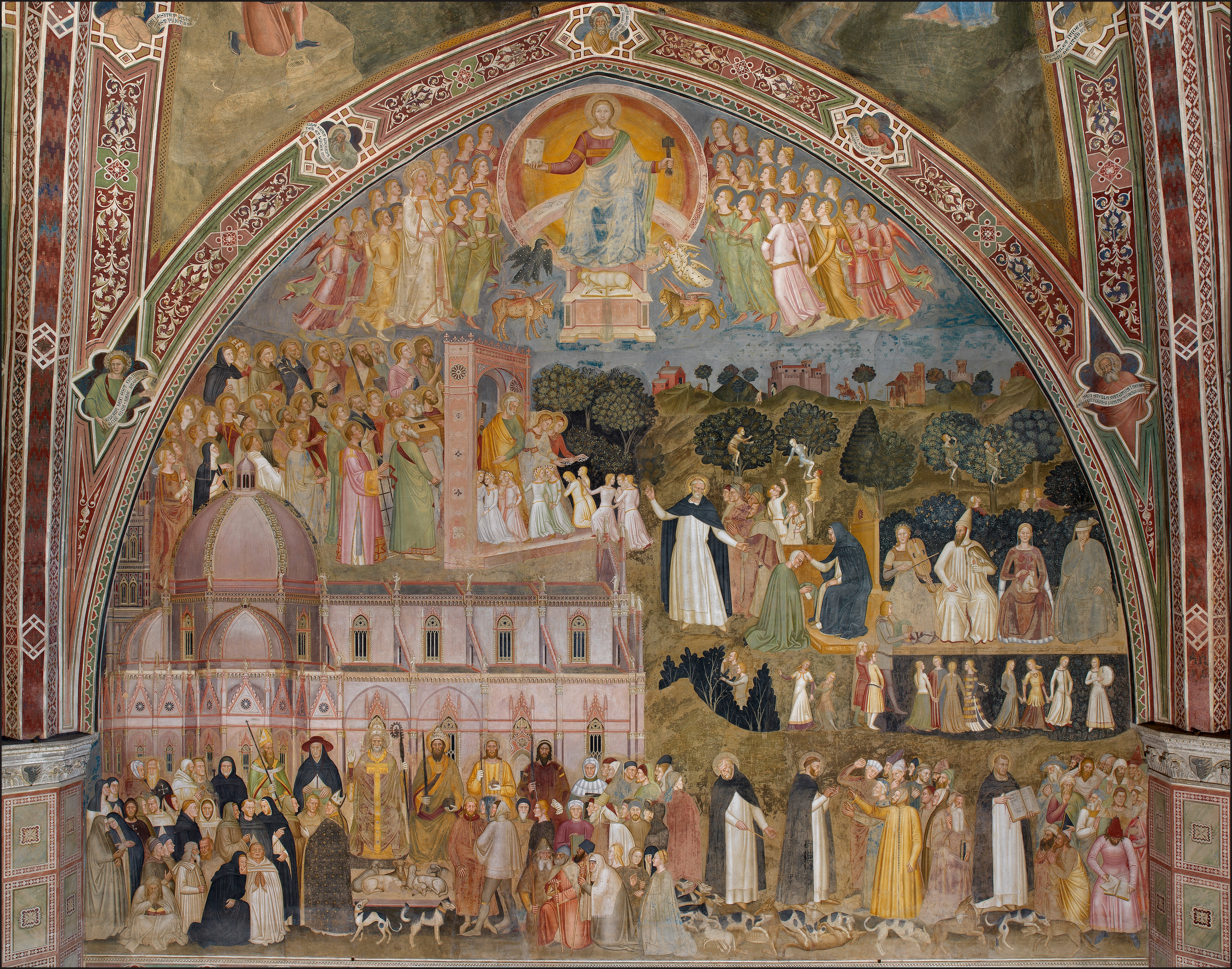
The Church Militant and the Church Triumphant, fresco by Andrea da Firenze in Santa Maria Novella, c. 1365

In some strains of Christian theology, the Christian Church may be divided into:

- the Church Militant (Latin: Ecclesia militans), also called the Church Pilgrim, which consists of Christians on Earth who struggle as soldiers of Christ against sin, the devil, and "the rulers of the world of this darkness, against the spirits of wickedness in the high places";
- the Church Penitent (Latin: Ecclesia poenitens), also called the Church Suffering (Latin: Ecclesia dolens) or the Church Expectant (Latin: Ecclesia expectans), which in the theology of certain churches, especially that of the Catholic Church, consists of those Christians currently in Purgatory; and
- the Church Triumphant (Latin: Ecclesia triumphans), which consists of those who have the beatific vision and are in Heaven.

Within Catholic ecclesiology these divisions are known as the "three states of the Church". The actual language used in the Catechism of the Catholic Church states that "The three states of the Church… at the present time some of his disciples are pilgrims on earth. Others have died and are being purified, while still others are in glory, contemplating 'in full light, God himself triune and one, exactly as he is'."

In Protestant theology, which rejects the doctrine of Purgatory, the Churches Militant and Triumphant are together known as the two states of the Church. These divisions are often discussed in the context of the doctrine of the communion of saints; although Christians may be physically separated from each other by the barrier of death, they nonetheless remain united to each other in one Church, and support each other in prayer.

== Etymology ==
=== Militant ===
The term militant (Latin: militans) has a primary meaning of "being a soldier, performing military service", but it acquired a secondary meaning of "serving, performing service, laboring", with its root milito coming to mean "soldier of Christ or God" in Medieval Latin usage. The members of the Church Militant, i.e. those Christians on earth, are engaged in spiritual warfare against sin in order that, when they die, they might enter heaven and join the Church Triumphant. Failing that directly, those who believe in the existence of Purgatory hope to die in a state of grace and join the Church Penitent, to purify themselves of their imperfections and, ultimately, join the Church Triumphant.

=== Penitent ===
The term penitent (Latin: poenitens or paenitens) means "repenting, being sorry". Those who constitute the Church Penitent are in Purgatory to satisfy whatever portion of the temporal punishment due for their sins was not satisfied before death. They are in a process of purging their imperfections before entering heaven. It is held that all members of the Church Penitent will eventually join the Church Triumphant.

The alternate term suffering (Latin: dolens, lit. 'grieving') emphasizes the nature of souls' experience in Purgatory; they are suffering the temporal consequences of their sins to redemptive effect. The other alternative, expectant (Latin: expectans or exspectans), emphasizes that the souls of Purgatory are awaiting expectantly the beatific vision of heaven.

=== Triumphant ===
The term triumphant (Latin: triumphans) means "exulting, rejoicing exceedingly", taken from a figurative usage of triumphus, originally designating the Roman triumph. Those who constitute the Church Triumphant rejoice eternally in the glory of God, to whom they are united in the beatific vision.

== Usage in different Christian Churches ==
=== Catholic Church ===
The Catholic Church commemorates the Church Triumphant and the Church Penitent in its liturgy on two consecutive days: All Saints' Day on November 1 (the Church Triumphant) and All Souls' Day on November 2 (the Church Penitent).

These terms are not used in the Catechism of the Catholic Church, an authoritative summary of the teaching of the Catholic Church published in 1994. However, the teaching these terms represent is precisely restated, quoting Lumen gentium:

The three states of the Church. "When the Lord comes in glory, and all his angels with him, death will be no more and all things will be subject to him. But at the present time some of his disciples are pilgrims on earth. Others have died and are being purified, while still others are in glory, contemplating 'in full light, God himself triune and one, exactly as he is'."

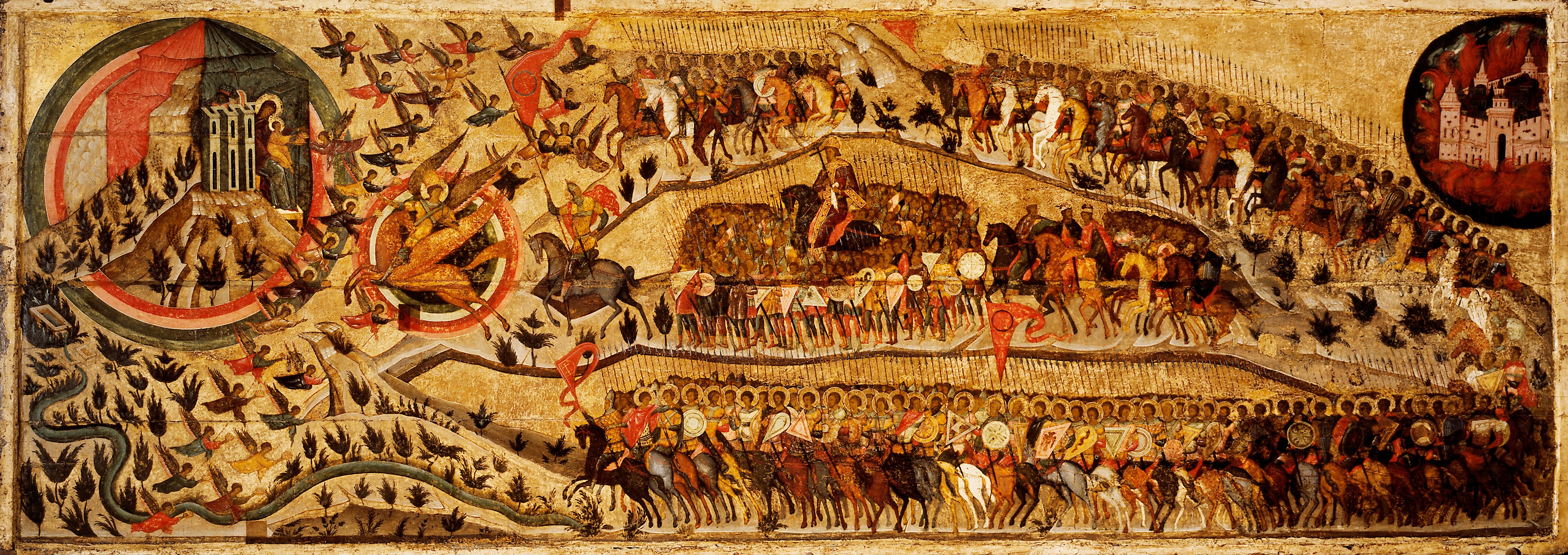
Ecclesia militans, one of the largest icons in existence

=== Anglican Communion ===
Anglicans believe that "…the Church on earth is united with the Church in heaven, ('sanctorum communio'). They speak of the 'Church Militant here on earth' and the Church triumphant in heaven. They worship God together with 'angels and archangels, and with all the company of heaven.'"

=== Lutheran Church ===
Eric Lund, a Lutheran professor, described an analogy relating the Old Testament to the New Testament: "God ordered two altars to be placed in the tabernacle. Fire was transferred from the outer one to the inner one. God also assembled a twofold church: the church militant and the church triumphant. The fire of love will someday be transferred from the church militant to the church triumphant." As such, within Lutheranism, "That is called the Church militant, which in this life is still fighting, under the banner of Christ, against Satan, the world, and the flesh."

Likewise, "That is called the Church triumphant, which, being transferred to heavenly rest, and relieved from the labor of fighting, and the danger of being overcome in heaven against all contending powers." Heinrich Schmid, a Lutheran theologian explains that the Church Militant derives her name from spiritual warfare, citing Ephesians 6:10, 1 Peter 5:8–9, 1 John 5:4, Romans 7:14, and Galatians 5:17; he further states that the Church Triumphant derives her name from spiritual victory, citing Revelation 2:10, Revelation 4:4, and Revelation 7:9.

=== Methodist Churches ===
The African Methodist Episcopal Church, a part of the World Methodist Council, defines the Church Militant as "engaged in constant warfare against the world, the flesh and the devil, and in that respect is distinguished from the Church Triumphant." It defines the Church Militant as inclusive of all Christian denominations, among them Methodism, Presbyterianism, Baptist churches, Congregational churches, Anglicanism, among many others. In the same fashion, it defines the Church Triumphant as existing "in heaven, and consist[ing] of those who have washed their robes and made them immaculate and pure in the blood of the Lamb."

In Methodist theology, "the communion expressed at the Eucharist is not only within the Church Militant, but is between the Church Militant and the Church Triumphant."

=== Seventh-day Adventist Church ===
The Seventh-day Adventist Church defines the terms in the following ways, "While in this world the church is a militant church, daily engaged in the battles of its Lord, and in warfare against satanic agencies. Its members are in constant conflict with the world, the flesh, and the powers of evil (Rom. 7:15–23; Gal. 5:17; 1 Peter 5:8, 9; 1 John 5:4; cf. 1 John 4:4). If this side of the Lord's return the church is the militant church, the church of the New Jerusalem is the triumphant church. It is made up of faithful disciples and conquerors in this worldly battle. They have exchanged the sword for a palm of victory (Rev 7:9) and the cross for a crown (2 Tim. 4:8; 1 Peter 5:4). The battle is over, the mission accomplished (Matt. 25:21, 23) and the redeemed, invited to the wedding feast of the Lamb (Rev. 19:9), eat and drink at Christ's table in His kingdom (Luke 22:28–30) and reign with Him for ever and ever (Rev 22:5)." Thus, the Seventh-day Adventist view is that the church is the Church Militant until the general resurrection at the end of the present age. The church becomes the Church Triumphant only after the second coming of Christ.

== Secular uses ==
The two states account of the church was adapted by Anatoly Lunacharsky to distinguish between a socialistic culture of the future (Ecclesia triumphans) and proletarian culture of the proletariat struggling in the present against capitalism (Ecclesia militans). This theoretical approach was used in the development of Proletkult.

== See also ==
- Baptism by fire
- Book of Common Prayer
- Christian mysticism
  - Catholic spirituality
  - Sacred Heart
  - Immaculate Heart of Mary
  - Marian devotions
  - Eastern Orthodox theology
  - Pietism
- Ecclesiology
  - Catholic ecclesiology
  - Organization of the Eastern Orthodox Church
  - Protestant ecclesiology
- Christian martyr
- Miles Christianus
- Persecution of Christians
- Saint
- Spiritual warfare

== Sources ==
- The Spirit of Catholicism, ch. 7-8 ("The Communion of Saints")] by Karl Adam
- Communion of Saints - article from the Catholic Encyclopedia
- Lumen gentium (Dogmatic Constitution on the Church), n. 49
- The Catholic Church Is The Mystical Body Of Christ by FR. William G. Most
