= Johann Baptist Lüft =

German Catholic theologian

Johann Baptist Lüft (30 March 1801 in Hechtsheim – 23 April 1870 in Darmstadt) was a German Catholic theologian, known for his contributions made to the Catholic elementary school system in Hesse.

He received his education at the episcopal school in Mainz. In 1824 he was ordained as a priest, and later on, he taught classes at the Catholic seminary in Mainz. In 1830 he relocated to Giessen as a pastor and a professor to the theological faculty at the university. In 1835 he became a pastor and superintendent in Darmstadt, then in 1852 was appointed Ehrendomkapitular (honorary canon) at Mainz Cathedral.

== Published works ==
With Johannes von Kuhn, Johann Nepomuk Locherer and Franz Anton Staudenmaier, he was co-editor of the publication "Mitherausgeber der Jahrbücher für Theologie und christliche Philosophie". The following is a list of his noteworthy written efforts:

- Betrachtungen über die neuesten Angriffe auf die Ehre der katholischen Kirche. Epistel an Röhr in Weimar und Zimmermann in Darmstadt, 1839 – Reflections on the latest attacks on the honor of the Catholic Church. Epistle to Johann Friedrich Röhr in Weimar and Karl Zimmermann in Darmstadt.
- Liturgik oder wissenschaftliche Darstellung des katholischen Cultus, 1844–47 – Liturgic or scientific representation of Catholicism.
- Betrachtungen über den christlichen Glauben und das christliche Leben (sermons), 1852 – Reflections on the Christian faith and the Christian life.
