= Karl Adam (theologian) =

German theologian (1876–1966)

- Born: 22 October 1876; Pursruck, Upper Palatinate, Bavaria, German Empire
- Died: 1 April 1966 (aged 89); Tübingen, Baden-Württemberg, West Germany
- Education: Ludwig-Maximilians-Universität München
- Occupation: Theologian
- Notable work: The Spirit of Catholicism (1924); The Christ of Faith (1954)
- Theological work
- Tradition or movement: Tübingen school
- Main interests: Christology, ecclesiology, ecumenism, historical theology, systematic theology

Karl Adam (22 October 1876 – 1 April 1966) was a German Catholic theologian, known for his work in the fields of ecclesiology and Christology. He spent most of his academic career at the University of Tübingen, where he published work influenced by Lebensphilosophie and German Romanticism including The Spirit of Catholicism (1924), which argued for an understanding of the church as a community and for a revitalisation of Christian faith. Following Adolf Hitler's rise to power in 1933, Adam sought a rapprochement between the Nazi regime and the German Catholic Church. In pursuit of this aim, he published work during the Nazi era that sought to reconcile aspects of Catholic and nationalist thought, defended Nazi anti-Jewish legislation and expressed antisemitic sentiments. His later work included The Christ of Faith (1954), a collection of lectures on Christology.

== Life and career ==
=== Early life and education ===
Karl Adam was born in Pursruck, near Regensburg in the Upper Palatinate, Bavaria, on 22 October 1876. He had a brother, August Adam, who would also become a priest and would later in life become a critic of the Nazi regime. Soon after being ordained a priest of the Diocese of Regensburg in 1900, he matriculated at the Ludwig-Maximilians-Universität München, studying historical and systematic theology. He worked on the Latin Fathers in Munich and received his doctorate in 1904, submitting a thesis on the ecclesiology of Tertullian, and received his habilitation in 1908, completing a Habilitationsschrift on the Eucharistic theology of Augustine. In this period Adam's thought was influenced by Ignaz von Dollinger, Albert Ehrhard and Joseph Schnitzer.

=== Early career ===
Adam taught from 1908 until 1917 at the Wilhelmsgymnasium in Munich and was a tutor to the sons of Rupprecht, Crown Prince of Bavaria. In 1910 he published an article critical of Pius X's requirement that priests take the oath against modernism, which he described as "the official death notice regarding all Catholic scholarship" in Germany. This led to an investigation by the Holy Office, which ended when Crown Prince Rupprecht intervened on Adam's behalf. In 1917 he completed monographs on Pope Callixtus I's instruction on penance and on Augustine's account of forgiveness of sins. In the same year he began teaching at the University of Strasbourg, but was required to leave Strasbourg the following year due to a provision of the Treaty of Versailles which prohibited Germans from holding positions in the French civil service. He then moved to the University of Tübingen, where he took up a professorship in systematic theology. His work in the years from 1900 to 1918 focused on historical theology.

From 1919 Adam's work dealt predominantly with systematic theology. In these years he advocated ecumenism and criticised structures and hierarchies in the church that he saw as outmoded. Upon taking the position at Tübingen in 1919 he publicly declared his intention to continue the tradition of the Tübingen school, which emphasised scholarly dialogue between Catholic and Protestant theologians. He would remain at Tübingen for three decades, where his work focused on the critique of the church, the critique of modernity, and the development of a contemporary theology. In this period he also drew on the tradition of Lebensphilosophie, a school of thought rooted in German Romanticism that emphasised the interconnectedness of life. This aspect of his work, along with his use of the German language rather than Latin and his emphasis on the humanity of Jesus, once again drew scrutiny from the Holy Office, and his book The Spirit of Catholicism (1924) was threatened with placement on the Index Librorum Prohibitorum in 1932. Eventually, however, he was informed that neither The Spirit of Catholicism nor Christ Our Brother (1927) or The Son of God (1933) would be condemned provided he made certain revisions to the texts, which he did in 1933.

=== Nazi era ===
Adam was one of several German Catholic theologians who sought rapprochement between the church and Nazi Germany after Adolf Hitler's rise to power. He saw his role as that of a mediator between the church and the Nazi regime, and envisioned a new relationship between the church and state in which the church would exert a greater influence as part of a corporatist or communitarian system. While other Catholic theologians at Tübingen did not publicly oppose the Nazi regime, Adam was unusual in publicly seeking to mediate between the church and the regime. Nonetheless, he never became a member of the Nazi Party.

==== Early 1930s ====
In his 1933 essay "German Nationality and Catholic Christianity" ("Deutsches Volkstum und katholisches Christentum") Adam argued that the German nation should be primarily the domain of Christians of German heritage, rather than being a pluralistic, secular society. The essay examined the relationship between Catholicism and the "German race" in terms of the relationship between nature and grace. Building on an argument made by Karl Eschweiler, Adam argued that Protestantism demands the separation of church and state because it sees nature and grace as opposed, whereas in Catholicism nature and grace are intertwined, and thus so must be the church and state. In this model the state would oversee the natural order while the church would have primacy in matters supernatural. The essay argued that the church is capable of observing "the blood-given determinations of a race or people", such that Catholicism takes different forms in different countries. Adam described the church as "the true mother of all ethnic-racial identity" and declared that nationalism and Catholicism could complement one another. In the same essay, Adam argued that Nazi anti-Jewish legislation was justified by Germans' obligation to strengthen their own racial identity, an obligation he argued originated in the Old Testament, and implicitly endorsed the Nazi boycott of Jewish businesses and the Law for the Restoration of the Professional Civil Service. Nonetheless, Adam also argued that Christians were obliged to treat Jews justly and lovingly, and that it was wrong to deny the Jewishness of Jesus.

Whereas Adam's ecclesiological work in the 1920s had emphasised the universality of the church and its relationship to peoples' common humanity, in 1933 he began to see the unity between Christ and humans in the church as resting on racial and ethnic distinctions. He argued that the church could only flourish among a group of people to the extent that it took on the traits of those people, and that the German-speaking church must encourage the solidification of a German racial and ethnic identity.

In a 1934 speech Adam criticised the Nazi state's support for the German Faith Movement, a neopagan religious movement that called for Germans to reject Christianity. Adam argued that the strength of the German nation depended on the continuing dominance of Christianity, and that the neopagans failed to acknowledge the positive influence of Christianity on German culture over the course of centuries. Immediately following the speech he was denounced in a Nazi newspaper and harassed by the Sturmabteilung. Days later his licence to teach was revoked and his courses cancelled. The following week he was reinstated, having pledged to no longer criticise Nazism.

==== "The Spiritual Situation of German Catholicism" (1939) ====
Adam re-entered the political sphere following the invasion of Poland in 1939. He delivered a lecture entitled "The Spiritual Situation of German Catholicism" ("Die geistige Lage des deutschen Katholizismus"), in which he proposed three ways to foster Christian faith in Germany that he thought would also strengthen the nation and contribute to the blending of Catholicism and German culture: that the church should permit priests to be conscripted into the Wehrmacht, that the church should permit the use of the German language in the Catholic Mass, and that the Pope should canonise more Germans. His aim was to encourage Catholicism to modernise by responding to the "positive" elements of Nazism, and to limit the influence of the German Faith Movement in order to prevent the disintegration of Christianity in the Nazi state. Without naming the German Faith Movement or any other neopagan group, he described "a new Weltanschauung, a non-Christian and anti-Christian faith movement" filling the vacuum left by Christianity's decline. The lecture pleased pro-Nazi Catholics while angering Catholic opponents of Nazism. Joseph Joos accused Adam of watering down Catholic doctrine and failing to emphasise the divergences between Catholicism and Nazism, while Bishop Joseph Kumpfmüller told Adam the lecture had harmed the church and ordered him to cease speaking publicly about the war.

Bernhard Lichtenberg wrote to Adam upon reading the transcript of the lecture, accusing him of offering a "fatal vagueness" under the pretence of a clear delineation of the status of German Catholicism. Lichtenberg criticised Adam's argument that German Catholics ought to obey the Nazi authorities, argued that Adam accepted Nazi efforts to make Catholic doctrine secondary to other Weltanschauungen, and accused Adam of confusing the concept of Weltanschauung itself by treating it as solely a secular phenomenon then later using the term with regard to theological matters. He argued that Adam overlooked Nazism's anti-Christian and anti-Catholic themes, and objected to Adam's formulation of the concepts of original sin and "German nature". In concluding, Lichtenberg observed that the practical proposals Adam made had already, to a large extent, been implemented. Lichtenberg was later arrested, convicted of violating the Pulpit Law and the Treachery Act of 1934 and imprisoned, and died while being taken to the Dachau concentration camp.

==== "Jesus, the Christ, and We Germans" (1943) ====
In 1943 Adam wrote "Jesus, the Christ, and We Germans" ("Jesus, der Christus, und wir Deutsche"), which expressed anti-Semitic sentiments while defending Christianity from neopagan critiques. The essay argued that although Jesus was Jewish, he was not purely so, because he came from Galilee, a region where interracial marriage was common, and because the Immaculate Conception of the Virgin Mary meant he lacked the "ugly dispositions and forces which we condemn in full blooded Jews." The essay also reiterated the strong connection Adam perceived between the spirit of Christianity and that of Nazism. It was Adam's final effort to connect Catholicism and Nazism.

==== Adam's reasons for accommodating Nazism ====
Krieg has argued that Adam's pursuit of accommodation between the church and the Nazi government was due to his belief that the church should play a central and fundamental role in society and the state. Krieg also argues that Adam's political naivety was in large part the result of his dependence on the ideas and categories of German Romanticism, which led him to envision a national community in harmonious relation to the church, and thus to misjudge political realities and fail to realise the incompatibility of Nazi ideology with Christian faith. In addition to his Romanticism, Krieg argues that Adam's political stance was also informed by the view that Germany was threatened by modernity and the tendencies toward democracy, individualism, secularisation and a modern notion of freedom that promoted diversity. These tendencies, Adam thought, required new social and political formations that would restore order and encourage community, tradition and Christian faith. The theologian Klaus Schatz argued that Adam's "predilection for the 'vital' and 'organic'" and his rejection of rationalism and liberalism contributed to his willingness to accommodate Nazism.

Robert Spicer argues that Adam's expression of common themes uniting Catholicism and Nazism can be seen as in keeping with the themes of Tübingen school theology. Whereas his precursors at Tübingen had attempted to situate Christianity within the culture of the day, the specific culture in which Adam operated was one influenced to a great extent by Nazi ideology. Spicer argues that, while Adam's overtures to Nazism were understandable in the early 1930s, by 1939, after Kristallnacht and the Nazis' persecution of the Catholic Church, they became incomprehensible. Spicer claims Adam "allowed himself to be so influenced by the National Socialist milieu that he could not properly discern between what he should accept and reject from the movement's ideology." John Connelly argues that Adam saw Hitler as a figure capable of bridging the divide between German Catholics and Protestants, in keeping with his earlier support for ecumenism.

=== Post-war career and death ===
The University of Tübingen was occupied by the French Army in 1945 as part of the denazification process. Neither Adam nor any of Tübingen's other Catholic theologians were among those imprisoned or banned from teaching for promoting Nazism or the Nazi regime's human rights violations. No work was published in postwar Germany questioning or censuring Adam's support for Nazism. Krieg writes that "it is not clear ... that Adam ... ever acknowledged his own misjudgment about and complicity with the Third Reich."

In the postwar years Adam became involved in the ecumenical movement and stressed the need for co-operation between German Catholics and Protestants. As one of the first German Catholic theologians to contribute to ecumenism, he argued that Protestants and Catholics were united by belief in certain Christian truths, and was motivated in part by his continued belief that Christianity ought to form the foundation of German government and society. Adam retired in 1949, becoming a professor emeritus at Tübingen. He withdrew from public life in the 1950s, and was nominated to be part of a preparatory commission for the Second Vatican Council in 1959, but declined for health reasons. However, Adam later served as a peritus (theological expert) at Vatican II. Adam died in Tübingen on 1 April 1966.

== Works ==
Adam's best-known works include The Spirit of Catholicism (1924), The Son of God (1934), Christ Our Brother (1929) and The Christ of Faith (1954). Krieg names four central concepts in Adam's theology: first, the view of Christ as the sole mediator between God and creation and as the only figure to unite the divine and human worlds; second, the conception of the church as the Body of Christ, existing to make Christ present in the world; third, an account of Christianity as faith specifically within the context of the community of the church; and fourth, a pessimistic evaluation of Western civilisation, which he thought was experiencing a long decline. Adam's books were directed at the general reader, rather than appealing solely to theologians.

=== The Spirit of Catholicism (1924) ===
In The Spirit of Catholicism (1924), Adam critiqued rationalism, which he argued had distanced people from themselves, from their communities and from God; the Enlightenment, which he claimed prioritised intellect over feelings and relationships; and modernity itself. In mounting this critique he drew on the thought of Max Scheler. Arguing along similar lines to Joseph Lortz and Oswald Spengler, Adam diagnosed a centuries-long spiritual and cultural decline in Western civilisation, which he argued had begun in the Late Middle Ages and culminated in the Enlightenment. He argued this decline could be arrested, however, by a revitalisation of belief in Christ and the church.

The account of the church in The Spirit of Catholicism differed from neo-scholastic conceptions of the church as an institution and from Protestant understandings of the church as an assembly of individuals. Adam rejected both the First Vatican Council's juridical account of the church and accounts such as that of Friedrich Heiler, who saw the church as "a complex of opposites" united by papal authority. In their place Adam drew on the work of Johann Adam Möhler in describing the church as first and foremost a community, and on Paul the Apostle's description of the church as the Body of Christ. The book also rejects Adolf von Harnack's emphasis on the historical Jesus, emphasising a kerygmatic Christology akin to that of Johannes von Kuhn.

Karl Heim, a Protestant colleague of Adam's at Tübingen, responded to The Spirit of Catholicism with a series of lectures that were published under the title The Nature of Protestantism in 1925. George Orwell reviewed The Spirit of Catholicism in The New English Weekly in 1932. Orwell differentiated the book from works of "Catholic propaganda", which focus on the basis of Catholic faith and criticisms of its opponents; Orwell praised Adam, by contrast, for his focus on "what goes on inside the Catholic soul". The book's main significance for non-Catholics, Orwell argued, was as an example of the "Hebrew-like pride and exclusiveness of the Catholic mind".

The Spirit of Catholicism has been translated into 13 languages, and was an influence on thinkers including Robert McAfee Brown, Dorothy Day, Thomas Merton, Flannery O'Connor, Alec Vidler, Evelyn Underhill and Pope Paul VI, who drew on it in his papal encyclical Ecclesiam suam. It was one of the most widely read works of German Catholic thought in the first part of the 20th century. Krieg has described The Spirit of Catholicism as "one of the most important studies in Catholic theology during the period between the First Vatican Council (1869–70) and the Second Vatican Council (1962–65)."

=== The Christ of Faith (1954) ===
The Christ of Faith (1954), a collection of lectures, is a comprehensive history of Christology and Adam's final major work. The lectures discuss the sources of Christology and recount the history of controversies in the field, then examine the doctrine of salvation. Here Adam defines Christology as the study of images of Christ, of which he identifies three: the "dogmatic image" found in doctrine, the "reflected image" found in the Bible, and the "living image", formed through the meeting of the other two images and the church.

Juniper Cummings, reviewing the English translation of The Christ of Faith, declined to endorse the book "without reservation", noting that certain statements may lend themselves to misrepresentation, while others suffer from inexactitude, but noted that many of its apparent flaws may in fact be "legitimate differences of theological opinions", while others may stem from insufficient attention to updating the lectures when compiling them. Flannery O'Connor, in her review published in 1958, identified The Christ of Faith as containing an implicit argument against efforts to reconstruct Christianity as a syncretic religion, praised the book's critique of "the errors of liberal theology", and described it as "a master work by one of the Church's greatest living theologians."

=== Other works ===
In the essay "Faith and the Scholarly Study of Faith in Catholicism" ("Glauben und Glaubenswissenschaft im Katholizismus", 1920) Adam developed an account of faith that differed from neo-scholastic and rationalist approaches, in which faith is essentially private, and argued that faith has a communal character, relating to encounters with Christ that occur in the church.

In Christ Our Brother (1927) Adam focuses on the Gospels' accounts of Jesus' life and teachings and argues, again in opposition to neo-scholasticism, for the humanity of Christ: rather than seeing him as passive or weak, Adam describes Christ as embodying humanity's best qualities and achieving its fullest potential. In this reading the incarnation of Christ is seen as the central event in human history, and as representing the meeting of the human and divine not through the ascent of the former but rather through the descent of the latter.

Christ and the Western Mind (1928) again drew on Scheler in critiquing modernity, rationalism and the Enlightenment. Here Adam described a process of secularisation, beginning in the Late Middle Ages and incorporating the Reformation and the Enlightenment. He argued again for the necessity of a return to Christ and the church, which would require a clear presentation of Christian doctrine.

The Son of God (1933) similarly considers the Gospels' accounts of Jesus, and argues for Christ's humanity and the centrality of the incarnation of Christ. The Son of God was also influenced by Friedrich Nietzsche's Lebensphilosophie and was widely translated.

One and Holy (1948), a collection of essays, expressed support for ecumenism.

== Evaluation ==
Krieg describes Adam as both "one of the most creative theologians of the early twentieth century" and, due to his support for Nazism, "one of the most naive". Krieg argues that Adam played a significant role in the renewal of Catholic theology in the first half of the 20th century, but weakened Christian resistance to Hitler by stressing the perceived common ground uniting Nazism and Catholicism. Krieg identifies Adam's pessimistic evaluation of Western civilisation as the fatal flaw in his thought, which led him to seek accommodation with Nazism. Adam's theory of history, Krieg argues, was insufficiently complex and failed to consider the capacity of the church and tradition to adapt.

Krieg argues that, although Adam anticipated insights of the Second Vatican Council in his account of Christ's humanity and the church as a community, he remained within the horizon of the First Vatican Council in his rejection of modern ideas of freedom. Krieg suggests that Adam's life and work provides a lesson in the impossibility of "turn[ing] back the clock in order to restore the relationship that existed between the Church and the state in an earlier epoch." Adam's theology also provides a positive lesson, however, in Krieg's view, insofar as Adam in The Spirit of Catholicism acknowledged that the church would have to adapt to non-European cultures and to diversify.

James Carroll described Adam as "perhaps the most notable Catholic theologian of his generation" and identified this eminence as the reason why Adam's position on Nazism is significant. Writing in Commonweal in 2008, John Connelly argued that Adam's engagement with Nazism indicates "the dangers of speculation, of making judgments about the fulfillment of God's will in history." Connelly also described Adam as "the rare theologian who made the presence of God seem tangible", identifying this as a reason why Adam ought not to be forgotten.

== List of works ==
- "Faith and the Scholarly Study of Faith in Catholicism" (1920)
- The Spirit of Catholicism (1924)
- Christ our Brother (1927)
- Christ and the Western Mind (1928)
- The Son of God (1933)
- "Jesus, the Christ, and We Germans" (1943)
- One and Holy (1948)
- The Christ of Faith (1954)

== See also ==
- Religion in Nazi Germany

== Sources ==
- Carroll, James (2002). Constantine's Sword: The Church and the Jews: A History. Houghton Mifflin. ISBN 061821908-0.
- Connelly, John (14 January 2008). "Reformer & Racialist: Karl Adam's Paradoxical Legacy". Commonweal.
- Connelly, John (2012). From Enemy to Brother: The Revolution in Catholic Teaching on the Jews, 1933–1965. Harvard University Press. ISBN 978-067406488-1.
- Cummings, Juniper (1958). "Review of The Christ of Faith by Karl Adam". The Thomist. 21 (1): 80–84. doi:10.1353/tho.1958.0004.
- Krieg, Robert A. (1984). "Karl Adam's Christology: Toward a Post-critical Method". The Heythrop Journal. 25 (4): 456–474. doi:10.1111/j.1468-2265.1984.tb00559.x.
- Krieg, Robert A. (1999). "Karl Adam, National Socialism, and Christian Tradition" (PDF). Theological Studies. 60 (3): 432–456. doi:10.1177/004056399906000302. Archived from the original (PDF) on 21 March 2017.
- Krieg, Robert A. (2004). Catholic Theologians in Nazi Germany. Continuum. ISBN 978-144119120-5.
- Lehner, Ulrich L. (22 January 2007). "Improper Wisdom: What the Pope Learned from August Adam". Commonweal.
- Misner, P. (2003). "Adam, Karl". New Catholic Encyclopedia. Vol. 1 (2nd ed.). Gale. p. 107.
- O'Connor, Flannery (1983) [First published 1958]. "Review of The Meeting of Love and Knowledge by M. C. D'Arcy and The Christ of Faith by Karl Adam". In Martin, Carter W. (ed.). The Presence of Grace and Other Book Reviews. University of Georgia Press. pp. 54–55. ISBN 978-082030663-6 – via Internet Archive.
- Orwell, George (1968) [First published 1932]. "Review". In Orwell, Sonia; Angus, Ian (eds.). The Collected Essays, Journalism and Letters of George Orwell, Volume 1: An Age Like This 1920–1940. Penguin. pp. 102–105.
- Schwarz, Hans (2005). Theology in a Global Context: The Last Two Hundred Years. William B. Eerdmans. ISBN 978-080282986-3.
- Spicer, Kevin (2001). "Last Years of a Resister in the Diocese of Berlin: Bernhard Lichtenberg's Conflict with Karl Adam and His Fateful Imprisonment". Church History. 70 (2): 248–270. doi:10.2307/3654453. JSTOR 3654453.
