= Gröne =

Gröne or Groene is a German surname. Notable people with the surname include:

- Bernd Gröne (born 1963), German cyclist
- Mike Groene
- Valentin Gröne (1817–1882), German Catholic theologian

== See also ==
- LaGrone
