= Grone =

Grone, Grône, Gröne may refer to:

- Grone, Lombardy, Italian comune in Bergamo province
- Grone (river), German river
- Gröne, German surname
- Grône, Swiss municipality in Valais canton
