= The Spirit of Catholicism =

The Spirit of Catholicism (German: Das Wesen des Katholizismus) is a theological work of Catholic ecclesiology by Karl Adam, first published in 1924. It is considered the main work of the author.

In the book Adam critiqued rationalism, which he argued had distanced people from themselves, from their communities and from God; the Enlightenment, which he claimed prioritised intellect over feelings and relationships; and modernity itself. In mounting this critique he drew on the thought of Max Scheler. Arguing along similar lines to Joseph Lortz and Oswald Spengler, Adam diagnosed a centuries-long spiritual and cultural decline in Western civilisation, which he argued had begun in the Late Middle Ages and culminated in the Enlightenment. He argued this decline could be arrested, however, by a revitalisation of belief in Christ and the church.

The account of the church in The Spirit of Catholicism differed from neo-scholastic conceptions of the church as an institution and from Protestant understandings of the church as an assembly of individuals. Adam rejected both the First Vatican Council's juridical account of the church and accounts such as that of Friedrich Heiler, who saw the church as "a complex of opposites" united by papal authority. In their place Adam drew on the work of Johann Adam Möhler in describing the church as first and foremost a community, and on Paul the Apostle's description of the church as the Body of Christ. The book also rejects Adolf von Harnack's emphasis on the historical Jesus, emphasising a kerygmatic Christology akin to that of Johannes von Kuhn.

Karl Heim, a Protestant colleague of Adam's at Tübingen, responded to The Spirit of Catholicism with a series of lectures that were published under the title The Nature of Protestantism in 1925. George Orwell reviewed The Spirit of Catholicism in The New English Weekly in 1932. Orwell differentiated the book from works of "Catholic propaganda", which focus on the basis of Catholic faith and criticisms of its opponents; Orwell praised Adam, by contrast, for his focus on "what goes on inside the Catholic soul". The book's main significance for non-Catholics, Orwell argued, was as an example of the "Hebrew-like pride and exclusiveness of the Catholic mind".

The Spirit of Catholicism has been translated into 13 languages, and was an influence on thinkers including Robert McAfee Brown, Dorothy Day, Thomas Merton, Flannery O'Connor, Alec Vidler, Evelyn Underhill and Pope Paul VI, who drew on it in his papal encyclical Ecclesiam suam. It was one of the most widely read works of German Catholic thought in the first part of the 20th century. Krieg has described The Spirit of Catholicism as "one of the most important studies in Catholic theology during the period between the First Vatican Council (1869–70) and the Second Vatican Council (1962–65)."

== Contents ==
- Chapter I: Introductory
- Chapter II: Christ in the Church
- Chapter III: The Church the Body of Christ
- Chapter IV: Through the Church to Christ
- Chapter V: The Foundation of the Church in the Light of the Teaching of Jesus
- Chapter VI: The Church and the Peter
- Chapter VII: The Communion of Saints (i)
- Chapter VIII: The Communion of Saints (ii)
- Chapter IX: The Catholicity of the Church
- Chapter X: The Church Necessary for Salvation
- Chapter XI: The Sacramental Action of the Church
- Chapter XII: The Educative Action of the Church
- Chapter XIII: Catholicism in its Actuality
