= Andrew La Grone =

American politician

Member of the Nebraska Legislature from the 49th district
- In office January 9, 2019 – January 6, 2021
- Preceded by: John Murante
- Succeeded by: Jen Day

Personal details
- Born: November 4, 1990 (age 35) Omaha, Nebraska, U.S.
- Party: Republican
- Spouse: Julie Slama (m. 2021)
- Children: 1
- Education: University of Nebraska–Lincoln; University of Nebraska College of Law

Andrew La Grone (born November 4, 1990) is a lawyer and a former member of the Nebraska Legislature.

== Early life ==
La Grone was born in Omaha, Nebraska.

== Education ==
La Grone graduated from Millard South High School in 2009. La Grone earned a B.A. from the University of Nebraska–Lincoln in 2012 and a J.D. with high distinction from the University of Nebraska College of Law in 2015.

== Career ==
La Grone is a lawyer and a member of the Nebraska State Bar Association. Between his undergraduate years and law school, La Grone served as a staff assistant in the Washington, D.C. office of U.S. Congressman Adrian Smith in 2013.

On January 9, 2019, La Grone was appointed by the governor to the Nebraska Legislature after his predecessor, John Murante, was elected as Treasurer of Nebraska. La Grone represented the 49th district from his appointment to January 2021. La Grone is a Republican.

La Grone ran for election to a full term in the 2020 election. He lost the primary election to business owner and Democrat Jen Day 53.1% to 46.9%. His campaign sent out a mailer criticizing Day featuring a photo of a volunteer and not the candidate herself. La Grone was defeated by Day in the November 2020 general election.

== Personal life ==
La Grone is Catholic. He married fellow state senator Julie Slama in December 2021. She converted to Catholicism before their marriage. Slama and La Grone have a son.
