= August Adam =

German Catholic priest and theologian (1888–1965)

- Born: 14 April 1888; Pursruck, Germany
- Died: 5 February 1965 (aged 76)
- Education: University of Tübingen; University of Freiburg
- Occupations: Theologian, teacher
- Notable work: The Primacy of Love (1931)
- Theological work
- Main interests: Love, sexuality, chastity, morality

August Adam (14 April 1888 – 5 February 1965) was a German Catholic priest and theologian. He is known for The Primacy of Love (1931), a theological study of love which argued for a rethinking of Catholic approaches to sexuality, chastity and morality.

== Early life and career ==
August Adam was born on 14 April 1888 in Pursruck, Upper Palatinate, Germany. His older brother Karl Adam was also a priest and theologian. August Adam was ordained a priest in the Diocese of Regensburg in 1911, and studied first under his brother at the University of Tübingen, then under Otto Schilling at the University of Freiburg. He received his doctorate in 1924 with a thesis entitled Arbeit und Besitz nach Ratherius von Verona (Work and Property after Ratherius of Verona). He was denied permission to pursue the necessary qualifications to teach at the university level for reasons that were never explained but likely had to do with his progressive views. Instead, he became a teacher in Straubing, first at a secondary school then at a Gymnasium from 1928 until 1953.

== The Primacy of Love ==
Adam's best-known work, The Primacy of Love, was published in 1931. In its theological account of love, the book is distinctive for treating love as synonymous with passion, and for its argument that eros is a manifestation of love. Love, Adam argues, should be at the core of Christian morality. Adam argues that sexuality can be a source of spiritual power, and that sins against the commandment "Thou shalt not commit adultery" are not necessarily more egregious than those against the others of the Ten Commandments. Adam did not downplay the importance of chastity, but saw chastity as the product of love rather than a route to love. Adam argued that morality and immorality cannot be reduced to chastity and unchastity, and that chastity is not the greatest of virtues, nor unchastity the greatest of sins. Adam argues that the question of sexuality should be understood as one part of a broader question: that of the place of Christ in the world. The book was praised in German theological journals and translated into several languages.

In a review in Theological Studies, Dietrich von Hildebrand praised The Primacy of Love's account of morality and of the history of the connection between impurity and immorality. Hildebrand criticised Adam, however, for failing to identify love as fundamental in the sexual sphere, despite his emphasis on the primacy of love in morality.

The Primacy of Love was controversial in its time: Adam was denied a professorship at the University of Passau by church leaders who were critical of his "modernist views on sexuality", and the book was only saved from being listed on the Index Librorum Prohibitorum after Karl Adam intervened in his brother's favour. Later, however, Pope Benedict XVI described The Primacy of Love as a "revolutionary" work that influenced him in his youth, and drew on themes from Adam's work in his discussion of eros in the encyclical Deus caritas est (2005).

== Nazi period ==
Adam belonged to the Bavarian People's Party and was an early critic of the Nazi Party, arguing that its ideology ran counter to Christian teachings, and so became a target of the Nazi regime. His book The Sixth Commandment was denied publication and he was scheduled to be executed in the event of a Nazi victory in the Second World War. During the Nazi period he grew estranged from his brother Karl, who supported the regime.

== Other work ==
In works including Tension and Harmony: About the Value of Dogma for Personal Life (1940) Adam criticises "proper" (korrekt) Christians who lack spiritual depth and do not practice Christian virtues in everyday life, and argued that Christians ought not to prioritise conformity to social conventions over the necessity of love. Ulrich L. Lehner argues that this too informed Benedict's Deus caritas est, which warns against becoming "proper Christians". Tension and Harmony described the tensions and harmonies shaping religious life (for example involving the body and soul, or the natural and supernatural), and argued for the necessity of not overemphasising either side of such dichotomies. In The Virtue of Freedom (1947), Adam argued that in the aftermath of World War II a new conception of freedom, closely associated with virtue and epikeia, was required to overcome totalitarianism. Christ and the Woman (1954) discussed the role of women in the Church.

== Influence ==
Along with von Hildebrand, Adam contributed to the development of the theology of the body. Lehner argues that Pope Paul VI drew on Adam's work in the encyclical Humanae vitae (1968), as did Pope John Paul II in Theology of the Body (1979–84), though neither mention him by name. Writing in 2007, Lehner described Adam as "a prescient moral theologian who, while popular in his own time, is little known today outside academic circles." Lehner elsewhere noted that, while Karl Adam is still widely read in the 21st century, "his brother August has been largely elided from the history of theology."

== Death ==
Adam died on 5 February 1965 and is buried at St. Michael's Cemetery in Straubing.

== List of works ==
- The Primacy of Love (1931)
- Tension and Harmony: About the Value of Dogma for Personal Life (1940)
- The Virtue of Freedom (1947)
- Christ and the Woman (1954)

== See also ==
- Catholic theology of sexuality
