= LaGrone =

LaGrone or La Grone is a surname. Notable people with the surname include:

- Andrew La Grone (born 1990), American politician
- Edward Lagrone (1957–2004), American serial killer
- John LaGrone (born 1944), Canadian football player
- Oliver LaGrone (1906–1995), African-American sculptor, poet, educator, and humanitarian
