= Nebraska State Bar Association =

Bar Association

- Type: Legal Society
- Headquarters: Lincoln, Nebraska, NE
- Location: United States
- Members: 9,200 in 2012 (3,200 out of state)
- Website: www.nebar.com

The Nebraska State Bar Association (NSBA) is the integrated (mandatory) bar association of the US state of Nebraska.

== History ==
In 1937, the Nebraska State Bar Association was created by order of the Nebraska Supreme Court. Its predecessor was a voluntary organization, the Nebraska Bar Association, which was founded in 1899.

== Mission ==
The association works to help Nebraska attorneys achieve the highest standards of competence, ethics, and professionalism and to protect and promote the administration of and access to justice.

== Structure ==
The NSBA is governed by a policy-making House of Delegates, whose members are elected; an Executive Council, consisting of one delegate elected from each of Nebraska's six Supreme Court districts; a chair and chair-elect, elected by the House of Delegates; and a president, president-elect, president-elect designate and immediate past president elected by active NSBA members.

The Bar requires Nebraska lawyers to complete 10 continuing education credits each year.

NSBA publishes Nebraska Lawyer Magazine, a monthly publication.
