= Constantine von Schäzler =

German Jesuit theologian

Constantine von Schäzler (b. at Ratisbon, 7 May 1827; d. at Interlaken, 9 September 1880) was a German Jesuit theologian.

== Life ==
By birth and training a Protestant, he was a pupil at the Protestant gymnasium St. Anna of Ratisbon; took the philosophical course at the University of Erlangen from 1844 to 1845; then studied law at the Ludwig-Maximilians-Universität München from 1845 to 1847, and at Heidelberg University from 1847 to 1848. After this he decided to enter military life and became a Bavarian officer; in 1850, however, he left the army, received the degree of Doctor of Laws at the University of Erlangen, and took up the practice of law.

He entered the Catholic Church at Brussels on 10 October 1850, and began the study of theology. At Leuven in 1851, he entered the Society of Jesus. After completing the studies, he was ordained to the priesthood at Liège on 11 September 1856. In 1857, he left the Jesuits and went on with his studies at the Ludwig-Maximilians-Universität München where in 1859 he took the degree of Doctor of Theology.

In 1861, he became a tutor in the seminary at Osnabrück; in 1862 privatdozent in the history of dogma at the University of Freiburg; in 1866 archiepiscopal councillor. During the First Vatican Council (1869–1870) he was at Rome as theologian to Bishop Josef Fessler; in 1873 he settled at Rome; in 1874 he was made a domestic prelate and was employed as consultor to various congregations. Shortly before his death he re-entered the Society of Jesus.

== Works ==
Schäzler was a prominent representative of Thomism. He was the author of the following works:

- "Die Lehre von der Wirksamkeit der Sakramente ex opere operato in ihrer Entwicklung innerhalb der Scholastik und ihrer Bedeutung für die christliche Heilslehre dargestellt" (Munich, 1860);
- "Natur und Uebernatur. Das Dogma von der Gnade und die theologische Frage der Gegenwart. Eine Kritik der Kuhn'schen Theologie" (Mainz, 1865);
- "Neue Untersuchungen über das Dogma von der Gnade und das Wesen des christlichen Glaubens" (Mainz, 1867) (these last two works belong to the controversy that Schäzler carried on with Johannes von Kuhn);
- "Das Dogma von der Menschenwerdung Gottes, im Geiste hes hl Thomas dargestellt" (Freiburg, 1870);
- "Die päpstliche Unfehlbarkeit aus dem Wesen der Kirche bewiesen. Eine Erklärung der ersten dogmatischen Constitution des vaticanischen Conncils über die Kirche Christi" (Freiburg, 1870);
- "Divus Thomas Doctor angelicus contra Liberalismum invictus veritatis catholicae assertor" (Rome, 1874);
- "Introductio in s. theologiam dogmaticam ad mentem D. Thomae Aquinatis", a posthumous work ed. by Thomas Esser (Ratisbon, 1882);
- "Die Bedeutung der Dogmengeschichte vom katholischen Standpunkt aus erortert", ed. Thomas Esser (Ratisbon, 1884).

== Sources ==
- Bruck, Geschichte der kathol. Kirche in Deutschland im XIX. Jahrhundert, III (Mainz, 1896), 329–31;
- Hugo von Hurter, Nomenclator, III (1895), 1226 sq.;
- Allgemeine deutsche Biographie, XXX, 649–51.
