= Johannes von Kuhn =

German Catholic theologian

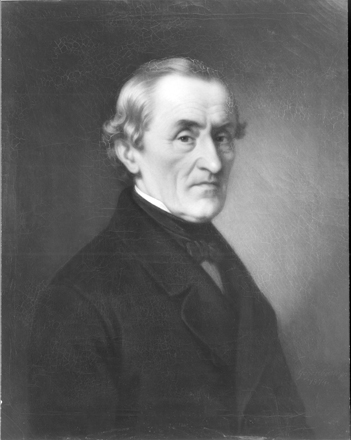
Johannes von Kuhn (Portrait by Josef Anton Gegenbauer, 1874)

Johannes Evangelist von Kuhn (19 February 1806 – 8 May 1887) was a German Catholic theologian. With Franz Anton Staudenmaier he occupied the foremost rank among the speculative dogmatists of the Catholic Tübingen school.

== Life ==
Kuhn was born in Wäschenbeuren in the Kingdom of Württemberg. He pursued his classical studies at Schwäbisch Gmünd, Ellwangen, and Rottweil, and courses in philosophy and theology from 1825 to 1830 at Tübingen; entered the seminary at Rottenburg in the autumn of 1830, and was there ordained on 14 September 1831. In the autumn of 1832, he became professor of New Testament exegesis in the Catholic theological faculty then attached to the University of Giessen. At Easter, 1837, he was called in the same capacity to the University of Tübingen, where, in 1839, he was appointed to the chair of dogmatic theology. He retired in 1882, dying five years later in Tübingen.

== Works ==
His first important work was the result of his research into the new philosophy Jacobi und die Philosophie seiner Zeit. Ein Versuch das wissenschaftliche Fundament der Philosophie historisch zu erörtern (Mainz, 1834). During the years he taught at Giessen, his literary activity in the domain of New Testament studies resulted in a series of articles which he published in the Jahrbücher für Theologie und christliche Philosophie (Frankfurt, 1834–6), edited by him and by his colleagues, Johann Nepomuk Locherer, Johann Baptist Lüft, and Franz Anton Staudenmaier. His work in this field closed with the important, though unfinished work, Das Leben Jesu wissenschaftlich bearbeitet (Mainz, 1838), in which he opposed the critical tendencies of David Strauss.

After he had taken the chair of dogmatic theology at Tübingen, he made the study of speculative dogma his life work. His most important work is the Katholische Dogmatik, an undertaking of wide scope which was never completed. The following parts appeared:

- Vol. I, part I: Einleitung in die katholische Dogmatik (Tübingen, 1846, 2nd ed., 1859);
- Vol. I, part II: Die dogmatische Lehre von der Erkenntniss, den Eigenschaften und der Einheit Gottes (1849; 2nd ed., 1862);
- Vol. II: Die christliche Lehre von der göttlichen Dreieinigkeit (1857).

Kuhn had already outlined his work in the paper "Über Princip und methode der speculativen Theologie" (University programme, Tübingen, 1840). Among his other works which were issued in part independently, and in part in the Tübingen "Theologische Quartalschrift," many bear a polemical character. His treatment of the fundamental questions on the relation of faith and knowledge, of philosophy and theology, brought about a controversy first with the Hermesians, and in later years with the advocates of the neo-Scholastic philosophy (Franz Jakob Clemens, Constantine von Schäzler). To the analysis of Hermesanism the work: "Über Glauben und Wissen, mit Rücksicht auf extreme Ansichten und Richtungen der Gegenwart" (Tübingen, 1839), is partly devoted. The "Philosophie und Theologie" (Tübingen, 1860) was directed against the philosopher Franz Jacob Clemens of Bonn, as was also the essay, "Das Verhältniss der Philosophie zur Theologie nach modern-scholastischer Lehre" (Theologische Quartalschrift," 1862, pp. 541–602; 1863, pp. 3–83).

In 1863 and the subsequent years, Kuhn was engaged in a controversy with Constantine von Schäzler, first in regard to a free Catholic University and later on the dogmatic question of the relation of nature and grace, of the natural and the supernatural. On the former question he wrote "Die Historisch-politischen Blätter über eine freie katholische Universität Deutschlands und die Freiheit der Wissenschaft" (Tübingen, 1863); on the latter he wrote "Das Natürliche und das Übernatürliche" (Tübingen, 1864). Schäzler then published his important work, "Natur und übernatur. Das Dogma von der Gnade und die theologische Frage der Gegenwart. Eine Kritik der Kuhn'schen Theologie" (Mainz, 1865), and later "Neue Untersuchungen über das Dogma von der Gnade" (Mainz, 1867). It was especially against these two works that Kuhn directed his last important book, "Die christliche Lehre von der goettlichen Gnade. Erster und allgemeiner Theil: Die urspruengliche Gnade und die damit zusammenhaengenden Untersuchungen über den Begriff und das Wesen der Gnade überhaupt, mit besonderer Beziehung auf die Scholastik und deren neueste Umdeutung" (Tübingen, 1868). A prospective second volume, in which the grace of Redemption was to be set forth from a positive and theoretical standpoint, never appeared.

Kuhn's works against contemporary philosophy included:

- "Die moderne Speculation auf dem Gebiet der christlichen Glaubenslehre" ("Theologische Quartalschrift," 1842, pp. 171–225; 1843, pp. 3–75; 179–226; 405–67);
- "Die Schelling'sche Philosophie und ihr Verhältniss zum Christenthum" ("Theologische Quartalschrift," 1844, pp. 57–88; 179–221; 1845, pp. 3–39).

Kuhn also opposed Hegel's philosophy of religion in the above-mentioned "Über Glauben und Wissen" (1839).
