= Hans Schwarz (theologian) =

German Lutheran theologian (born 1939)

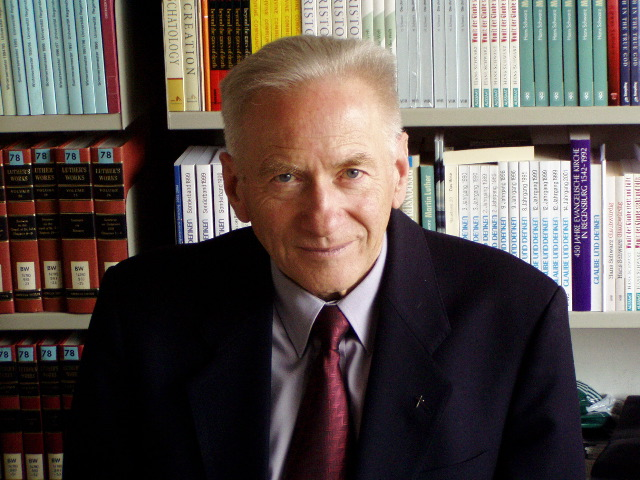
Hans Schwarz

Hans Schwarz (born January 5, 1939, in Schwabach, Germany) is a German Lutheran theologian.

== Life and career ==
After graduation from the Gymnasium (high school) in Schwabach, Schwarz studied theology and English literature at the Universities of Erlangen and Göttingen. In 1963 he passed the entrance exam of the Lutheran Church of Bavaria and obtained his Dr. theol. degree (summa cum laude) from the University of Erlangen. His thesis was on Das Verständnis des Wunders bei Heim und Bultmann (The Concept of Miracles in the Theologies of Karl Heim and Rudolf Bultmann; Stuttgart: Calwer Verlag, 1966). 1963-1964 he served as vicar at the church seminary in Nuremberg. The following year he obtained a WCC scholarship and a Fulbright Travel Grant to study at the Oberlin Graduate School of Theology in Oberlin, Ohio, US. After a brief vicarage at Sts. Peter and Paul in Erlangen-Bruck he was ordained into the Lutheran Church of Bavaria (1966). Then he started his Habilitation (second thesis) on Luther's understanding of nature facilitated by a research grant of the German Research Society (DFG).

In 1967 he accepted a call to the Evangelical Lutheran Theological Seminary in Columbus, Ohio, US, now Trinity Lutheran Seminary, first as Instructor for Systematic Theology, then Assistant and Associate Professor and finally as the first Edward C. Fendt Professor of Systematic Theology, a newly endowed chair. In 1981 he followed a call to the Chair of Protestant Theology (Systematic Theology and Contemporary Theological Issues) at the University of Regensburg, Germany. In 2004 he was named Emeritus but continues to be active at the Institute of Protestant Theology at the same university especially supervising doctoral students and maintaining contacts with foreign universities.

Schwarz has been invited to various visiting professorships: 1973/74 at the Augustana Hochschule in Neuendettelsau, Germany, 1974 at the Pontifical Gregorian University in Rome, Italy, and 2008 at the Charles University in Prague, Czech Republic, as well as 1985–2008 at the Lutheran Theological Southern Seminary in Columbia, SC, US, where he taught every second year for one semester. His intensive contacts with his former doctoral students on five continents led him to many lecture trips presenting nearly 600 lectures. In his book publications he covered the whole range of systematic theology. His special interest lies in the relationship between theology and the natural sciences, the history of theology especially of the 19th century, and the theologies of the Reformers. For more than forty years he has been a member of the American Academy of Religion where he has served numerous times on steering committees especially of the 19th Century Theology Group and the Lutheran Theologies and Global Lutheranism Group. He was also the president of the Karl Heim Society 2000–2014. Since church and theology belong together for him he has served for more than thirty years as a member of the church council of the Regensburg Neupfarrkirche which is also the university church. He preaches there regularly. He is the sole author of forty books, has edited another 25 books, and published more than 500 contributions to books and journals He has been the advisor of more than fifty doctoral students who teach in many theological institutions.

Schwarz is on the clergy roster of the Evangelical Lutheran Church in America and past president of Redeemer Lutheran Church in Columbus, Ohio.

== Honors ==
- Medal of Merit: Comenius University, Bratislava, Slovakia (1999)
- Dr. h. c. Orthodox Faculty, University of Oradea, Romania (2001)
- Silver Medal: Monastery Hosios Loukas, Greece (2001)
- Great Cross of the Patriarch: Romanian Orthodox Church (2003)
- Dr. h. c. Reformed University Debrecen, Hungary (2006)
- Medal of Merit: Hussite Theological Faculty, Charles University. Prague (2014)
- Honorary President: Karl-Heim-Gesellschaft (2018)

Writings done in his honour

- Glaube und Denken: Special Edition 1999 - On the Occasion of the 60th Birthday of Hans Schwarz. Theologie zu Beginn des 3. Jahrtausends im globalen Kontext – Rückblick und Perspektiven. Theology at the Beginning of the 3rd Millennium in a Global Context – Retrospect and Perspectives, ed. David C. Ratke, Frankfurt: Peter Lang, 1999. 340 pp.
- Glaube und Denken: Special Edition 2004 - Occasion of the 65th Birthday of Hans Schwarz. Die Bedeutung der Theologie für die Gesellschaft. The Significance of Theology for Society, ed. Anna M. Madsen, Frankfurt: Peter Lang, 2004. 485 pp.
- Doing Theology in a Global Context., ed. Craig L. Nessan and Thomas Kothmann, Bangalore, India: Asian Trading Corporation, 2009. 382 pp. Tribute to Rev. Prof. Dr. Hans Schwarz.
- Theology in Engagement with Church and Politics, ed. Matthias Heesch, Thomas Kothmann and Craig L. Nessan, Frankfurt: Peter Lang, 2014, 664 pp. Hans Schwarz on the Occasion of this 75th Birthday.

== Bibliography ==
- Theology in a Global Context: The Last Two Hundred Years. Grand Rapids, MI (USA), Cambridge (UK): Eerdmans, 2005. XVIII, 597 pp.
- The Theological Autobiography of Hans Schwarz. A Multi-Cultural and Multi-Denominational Ministry, Vorwort: Craig Nessan, Lewiston, NY: Edwin Mellen Press, 2009. 256 pp.
- Martin Luther. Einführung in Leben und Werk (revised and expanded third edition), Auflage, Neuendettelsau: Freimund-Verlag, 2010. 253 pp.
- Der christliche Glaube aus lutherischer Perspektive, Erlangen: Martin-Luther-Verlag, 2010. 273 pp.
- The God Who Is. The Christian God in a Pluralistic World, Eugene; OR: Cascade Books, 2010, 288 pp.
- 400 Jahre Streit um die Wahrheit – Theologie und Naturwissenschaft, Göttingen: Vandenhoeck & Ruprecht, 2012, 211 pp.
- "Planting Trees", in: Derek R. Nelson, Joshua M. Moritz, and Ted Peters, eds., Theologians in Their Own Words (Minneapolis: Fortress, 2013), pp. 233–246.
- The Human Being: A Theological Anthropology, Grand Rapids: Eerdmans, 2013, xiv, 401 pp.
- The Future of the Church, Eugene, OR: CASCADE Books, 2024, 193 pp.
- Luther for Everyone. Who He Was & Why He Still Matters, Minneapolis: Fortress, 2024, xv, 210 pp.
- “How My Mind Has Changed. On the Boundary”, in: Lutheran Quarterly (39/1 Spring 2025), pp. 58-66.
