= Robert A. Krieg =

American theologian (born 1946)

Robert Anthony Krieg (born February 8, 1946) is an American Catholic theologian and professor emeritus of theology at the University of Notre Dame. His scholarship examines modern Catholic theology, Christology, and the relationship between German Catholic thought and political history. His books include Karl Adam: Catholicism in German Culture (1992), Romano Guardini: A Precursor of Vatican II (1997), and Catholic Theologians in Nazi Germany (2004). He received the Henry Luce III Fellowship and the University of Notre Dame's Kaneb Teaching Award.

== Biography ==
Krieg was born in Hackensack, New Jersey in 1946, and grew up in Westport, Connecticut, from 1951 to 1964. He graduated from Stonehill College in 1969 and completed Master of Divinity studies at the University of Notre Dame from 1969 to 1971. He received a PhD in theology from Notre Dame in 1976. His doctoral dissertation examined the work of theologian Karl Barth, particularly his use of narrative.

Krieg was ordained a Catholic priest in the Congregation of Holy Cross in 1973. He resigned from the priesthood and was laicized in 2002.

== Career ==
Krieg began his academic career as an assistant professor of theology at King's College in Wilkes-Barre, Pennsylvania, where he taught from 1975 to 1977. He joined the University of Notre Dame in 1977, serving in its Department of Theology until his retirement in 2016. He progressed through the ranks of visiting assistant professor, assistant professor, associate professor, and professor, which he became in 1997. At Notre Dame, Krieg held several administrative positions in theological education. He directed field education for the Master of Divinity program from 1979 to 1985 and directed the program from 1985 to 1991. He later served as director of graduate studies and coordinated the systematic theology area of the doctoral program. From 2010 to 2016, he chaired the teaching committee of the PhD program.

Krieg became professor emeritus in 2016. He has continued to publish and contribute to scholarship on Catholic theology, including work on the German theologian Romano Guardini.

== Research ==
Krieg's research focuses on modern Catholic theology, Christology, and the history of German Catholic thought. His work on Christology examines how narratives shape theological interpretations of Jesus Christ. In Story-Shaped Christology: The Role of Narratives in Identifying Jesus Christ (1988), he explored the role of narrative in identifying and interpreting Jesus.

Krieg's writings on German Catholic theologians began with the 1980 essay "Kardinal Ratzinger, Max Scheler und eine Grundfrage der Christologie," translated into German by Josef Meyer zu Schlochtern and published in Theologische Quartalschrift, volume 160, no. 2 (1980), pp. 106–122. An English version, titled "Cardinal Ratzinger, Max Scheler and Christology," was subsequently published in The Irish Theological Quarterly, volume 47, no. 3 (1981), pp. 205–219. The essay led to ongoing scholarly exchanges with Cardinal Walter Kasper, Thomas F. O'Meara, O.P., and Hermann J. Pottmeyer, among other theologians. Krieg later co-edited and translated Cardinal Walter Kasper: Spiritual Writings with Patricia C. Bellm, published by Orbis Books in 2016.

Krieg has also written extensively on Romano Guardini, a German Catholic priest and theologian whose work influenced Catholic thought before and after the Second Vatican Council. In Romano Guardini: A Precursor of Vatican II (1997), Krieg examined Guardini's theological ideas and their relationship to developments associated with the council. His related scholarship has addressed Guardini's understanding of the human person, his engagement with modernity, and Jewish–Catholic relations.

His other theological interests include salvation, ecumenism, the development of doctrine, and the relationship between Christian theology and contemporary culture. He has contributed articles to academic journals and edited collections and has written for religious publications, including America and Commonweal.

He co-authored Christ the Savior: Historical Models for an Ecumenical Future (2026) with Brandon R. Peterson, examining historical models of Christology in relation to ecumenical theology. He also translated and provided commentary, with Fred R. Dallmayr, for Romano Guardini’s Narratives of My Life: Autobiographical Notes (2021), published by ATF Press.

== Awards and honors ==
- 1996: First-place award from the U.S. Catholic Press Association for his contributions to the Encyclopedia of Catholicism.
- 1997: Madden Teaching Award for teaching first-year undergraduates at the University of Notre Dame.
- 2003: Henry Luce III Fellowship for research on Catholic theologians and Nazism.
- 2005: Third-place award in history from the U.S. Catholic Press Association for Catholic Theologians in Nazi Germany.
- 2006: Kaneb Teaching Award for teaching undergraduates at the University of Notre Dame.
- 2010–2011: Louisville Institute Research Fellowship for research on Christ and Judaism.

== Selected publications ==
=== Books ===
- Krieg, Robert Anthony (1988). Story-shaped Christology: the role of narratives in identifying Jesus Christ. Theological inquiries. New York: Paulist Press. ISBN 978-0-8091-2941-6.
- Krieg, Robert Anthony (December 31, 1992). Karl Adam. University of Notre Dame Press. ISBN 978-0-268-08450-9.
- Krieg, Robert Anthony (1997). Romano Guardini : a precursor of Vatican II. Internet Archive. Notre Dame, Ind. : University of Notre Dame Press. ISBN 978-0-268-09150-7.
- Krieg, Robert (2004). Catholic Theologians in Nazi Germany. New York: Bloomsbury Publishing. ISBN 978-1-4411-9120-5.
- Krieg, Robert Anthony (2013). Treasure in the field: salvation in the Bible and in our lives. Collegeville, Minn: Liturgical Press. ISBN 978-0-8146-8068-1.
- Kasper, Walter; Colberg, Kristin; Krieg, Robert A., eds. (2014). The theology of Cardinal Walter Kasper: speaking truth in love. Collegeville, Minnesota: Liturgical Press. ISBN 978-0-8146-8315-6.
- Christ the Savior: Historical Models for an Ecumenical Future.
- Grün, Anselm (2019). Becoming new: finding God within us and in creation. Translated by Krieg, Robert A. Maryknoll, New York: Orbis Books. ISBN 978-1-62698-331-1.
- Guardini, Romano; Dallmayr, Fred R.; Krieg, Robert A. (2023). Romano Guardini : Narratives of My Life: Autobiographical Notes. Translated by Krieg, Robert A. ATF Press. ISBN 978-1-922737-84-7.
- Jägerstätter, Franz; Putz, Erna; Krieg, Robert Anthony (2009). Letters and writings from prison. Translated by Krieg, Robert A. Maryknoll, N.Y: Orbis Books. ISBN 978-1-57075-826-3.

=== Selected journal articles and book chapters ===
- Krieg, Robert A. (1998). "Romano Guardini's Theology of the Human Person". Theological Studies. 59 (3): 457–474. doi:10.1177/004056399805900305. ISSN 0040-5639.
- Krieg, Robert A. (1999). "Karl Adam, National Socialism, and Christian Tradition". Theological Studies. 60 (3): 432–456. doi:10.1177/004056399906000302. ISSN 0040-5639.
- Krieg, Robert A. (2000). "Case study in Jewish-Catholic dialogue". In Signer, Michael Alan (ed.). Humanity at the limit: the impact of the Holocaust experience on Jews and Christians. Bloomington: Indiana University Press. ISBN 978-0-253-33739-9.
- Krieg, Robert A. (2003). "The conflict between Engelbert Krebs and the Third Reich". In Dietrich, Donald J. (ed.). Christian responses to the Holocaust: moral and ethical issues. Religion, theology, and the Holocaust (1st ed.). Syracuse, N.Y: Syracuse University Press. ISBN 978-0-8156-3029-6.
- Krieg, Robert A. (2007). "German Catholic views of Jesus and Judaism, 1918–1945". In Spicer, Kevin (ed.). Antisemitism, Christian Ambivalence, and the Holocaust. Indiana University Press. ISBN 978-0-253-34873-9.
- Krieg, Robert A. (2021). "Romano Guardini's Berichte über mein Leben (1945): A constructive, yet critical dialogue with modernity". In Lerch, Magnus; Stoll, Christian (eds.). Gefährdete Moderne. Verlag Herder GmbH. ISBN 978-3-451-83753-1.
- Krieg, Robert A (March 1, 2023), "'Living in the Paschal Mystery: The Life, Work, and Sanctity of Romano Guardini'", Romano Guardini, ATF Press, pp. 103–142, ISBN 978-1-922737-87-8
