= Franz Jakob Clemens =

German Catholic philosopher and layman

Franz Jacob Clemens (4 October 1815 – 24 February 1862) was a German Catholic philosopher, a layman who defended the Catholic Church even on theological questions.

== Life ==
Clemens was born in Koblenz. After spending some time in an educational institution in Metz, he entered, at the age of sixteen, the Jesuit College of Fribourg, Switzerland, attended the Gymnasium at Koblenz, and thence passed to the University of Bonn. In 1835 he matriculated at the University of Berlin, where he devoted special attention to the study of philosophy and received the doctorate in philosophy in 1839 with a dissertation titled De philosophia Anaxagorae Clazomenii (On the Philosophy of Anaxagoras of Clazomenae).

At the end of a literary journey through Germany and Italy, he became, in 1843, instructor in philosophy at the University of Bonn, and taught there until 1856. In 1848 he was elected a member of the Frankfurt Parliament, and attended, at Mainz, the first Congress of the German Catholics, at which he suggested the foundation of the St. Vincent de Paul Society in Germany. In 1856 he was appointed professor of philosophy in the Academy of Münster.

So great was his popularity as a teacher at Bonn that, when he removed to the University of Münster, he was followed by some seventy students. The attendance at his lectures in the Westphalian capital was an extraordinarily large one; but his health failed after a few years. In 1861, upon the advice of his physicians, he sought relief in a southern climate; he died in Rome at the beginning of the following year and was buried at the Gesù.

== Works ==
He published his first major work, Giordano Bruno und Nikolaus von Cusa, in 1847, at Bonn. He also wrote in defence of the Holy Coat of Trier, Der heilige Rock zu Trier und die protestantische Kritik (1845), against Johann Gildemeister and Heinrich von Sybel.

His other principal writings were connected with two controversies in which he became involved. His book, Die speculative Theologie A. Günthers (Cologne, 1853), a clear demonstration of the contradiction between Catholic doctrine and the views of Anton Günther, elicited answers from Johann Baptista Baltzer and Franz Peter Knoodt, to which Clemens replied.

His De Scholasticorum sententia, philosophiam esse theologiae ancillam, commentatio (Münster, 1856) treated of the subordinate position which philosophy should occupy in regard to theology. It brought him into conflict with Professor Johannes von Kuhn of Tübingen, against whom he published, in defence of his position: Die Wahrheit in dem Streit über Philosophie und Theologie (Münster, 1860) and Ueber des Verhältniß der Philosophie zur Theologie (Mainz, 1860).
