= Valentin Gröne =

German theologian (1817–1822)

Valentin Gröne (7 December 1817 – 18 March 1882) was a Catholic theologian. He obtained a Doctor of Theology from the Ludwig-Maximilians-Universität München in 1848. In 1868, he became the dean of Irmgarteichen, within Netphen.

== Known works ==
- "Tetzel und Luther oder Lebensgeschichte und Rechtfertigung des Ablasspredigers und Inquisitors Dr. Johann Tetzel aus dem Predigerorden (Soest and Olpe, 1853, 2nd ed. 1860, abridged popular ed., "Tetzel und Luthur", Soest, 1862)
- "Die Papst-Geschichte" (2 vols., Ratisbon, 1864–66, 2nd ed., 1875)
- "Sacramentum oder Begriff und Bedeutung von Sacrament in der alten Kirche bis zur Scholastik" [Brilon (Soest), 1853]
- "Glaube und Wissenschaft" (Schaffhausen, 1860)
- "Der Ablass, seine Geschichte und Bedeutung in der Heilsokonomie" (Ratisbon, 1863)
- "Compendium der Kirchengeschichte" (Ratisbon, 1870)

=== Minor writings ===
- "Zustand der Kirche Deutschlands vor del Reformation" in the "Theologische Quartalschrift" (Tübingen, 1862), 84-138
- "Papst und Kirchenstaat" (Arnsberg, 1862)
