= Johann Nepomuk Locherer =

German Catholic theologian

Johann Nepomuk Locherer (August 21, 1773 – February 26, 1837) was a German Catholic theologian born in Freiburg im Breisgau.

From 1790 he studied theology in Freiburg, and furthered his education at the seminary in Meersburg. In 1798 he received his ordination in Breisach, and subsequently served in parishes in Rottenburg am Neckar (from 1799) and Endingen (from 1805). At Endingen he strove for educational reforms. In 1830 he became a professor to the Catholic theological faculty at the University of Giessen.

Locherer is remembered for publication of a major work on church history called Geschichte der christlichen Religion und Kirche. It contained nine volumes and was published from 1824 to 1836. He was also the author of textbooks on Christian church archaeology (Lehrbuch der christlich-kirchlichen Archäologie, 1832) and patristics (Lehrbuch der Patrologie, für akademische Vorlesungen bestimmt, 1837).
