= Franz Anton Staudenmaier =

German theologian

Franz Anton Staudenmaier (11 September 1800 - 19 January 1856) was a Catholic theologian. He was a major figure in the Catholic theology of Germany in the first half of the nineteenth century.

== Life ==
Born at Donzdorf, Württemberg, he was a pupil at the Latin school of Schwäbisch Gmünd between 1815 and 1818 and at the Gymnasium at Ellwangen from 1818 to 1822. During the years 1822–1826, he studied theology and philosophy at the University of Tübingen, where Johann Sebastian von Drey, Johann Georg Herbst, Johann Baptist von Hirscher, and Möhler were his teachers.

In the autumn of 1826 he entered the seminary at Rottenburg am Neckar, where he was ordained as a priest on September 15, 1827. After performing the duties of a parish priest for a year he became, in the autumn of 1828, a tutor in the Catholic theological seminary, "Wilhelmsstift" at Tübingen.

In 1830 he was made regular professor of dogmatic theology in the newly established Catholic theological faculty of the University of Giessen, which owed its brief period of prosperity largely to Staudenmaier and his colleague Johannes von Kuhn. In the autumn of 1837 he became the regular professor of dogmatic theology at the University of Freiburg. From 1843 he was also a cathedral canon.

Staudenmaier was a major figure in the Catholic theology of Germany in the first half of the nineteenth century and one of the most important writers on dogmatics of the Catholic Tübingen school. He was reported as a scholar of far-reaching knowledge, of great productive energy, and at the same time a philosopher with a talent for speculation. His service consisted in securing a deep speculative foundation for Christian truth and in attempting to defend against other perspective like Hegelian philosophy. He criticized Hegel's Absolute Spirit for its implied pantheism and determinism.

In addition he did much for two theological periodicals which he aided in founding and on which he collaborated. With his colleagues at Giessen he established the Jahrbücher für Theologie und christliche Philosophie (three yearly series in seven volumes, Frankfort am Main, 1834–35; Mainz, 1836). And in conjunction with his colleagues at Freiburg he established the Zeitschrift für Theologie (21 volumes, Freiburg im Breisgau, 1839–49). Both periodicals came into existence greatly through his efforts and attained high scholarly reputation through his contributions.

== Works ==
- Geschichte der Bischofswahlen (Tübingen, 1830)
- Johannes Scotus Erigena und die Wissenschaft seiner Zeit (1 pt. only, Frankfort, 1834)
- Encyklopädie der theologischen Wissenschaften als System der gesammten Theologie (Mainz, 1834; 2nd ed. 1 vol. only, Mainz, 1840), at the time of its publication an epoch-making work in the domain of Catholic theology
- Der Pragmatismus der Geistesgaben oder das Wirken des göttlichen Geistes im Menschen und in der Menschheit (Tübingen, 1835)
- Der Geist des Christenthums dargestellt in den heiligen Zeiten, in den heiligen Handlungen und in der heiligen Kunst (2 pts., Mainz, 1835; 5th ed., 1855; 8th ed., 1880), an introduction to the understanding of Catholic Christianity and its worship, based on a presentation of the Catholic Church year, and expressed in language that can be understood by all educated Christians, the most widely circulated book of Staudenmaier
- Geist der göttlichen Offenbarung, oder Wissenschaft der Geschichtsprincipien des Christenthums (Giessen, 1837)
- Die Philosophie des Christenthums oder Metaphysik der heiligen Schrift als Lehre von den gottlichen Ideen und ihrer Entwicklung in Natur, Geist, und Geschichte: Vol. I, Die Lehre von der Idee (Giessen, 1840)
- Darstellung und Kritik des Hegel'schen Systems. Aus dem Standpunkt der christlichen Philosophie (Mainz, 1844)
- Die christliche Dogmatik (vols. I-IV, i, Freiburg im Br., 1844–52). This is Staudenmaier's principal work, but was never finished.
- Das Wesen der katholischen Kirche, mit Rücksicht auf ihre Gegner dargestellt (Freiburg im Br., 1845)
- Zum religiösen Frieden der Zukunft, mit Rücksicht auf die religiös-politische Aufgabe der Gegenwart 3 pts., (Freiburg im Br., 1846–51).
