= Lesser sign of the cross =

Variant of the sign of the cross

A Catholic cleric demonstrating the lesser sign of the cross performed at the reading of the Gospel

The lesser, (Note: This article follows the practice of the Encyclopædia Britannica calling it the "lesser sign of the cross".) small or little sign of the cross is a variant of the sign of the cross. It is a liturgical gesture made by members of some Christian denominations, especially Catholicism and Anglicanism.

The ancient gesture is made with the thumb of the right hand on the forehead, lips, and breast (heart). It is commonly made by the celebrant and the attending worshipers before the reading of the Gospel during celebrations of the Eucharist.

== Description ==
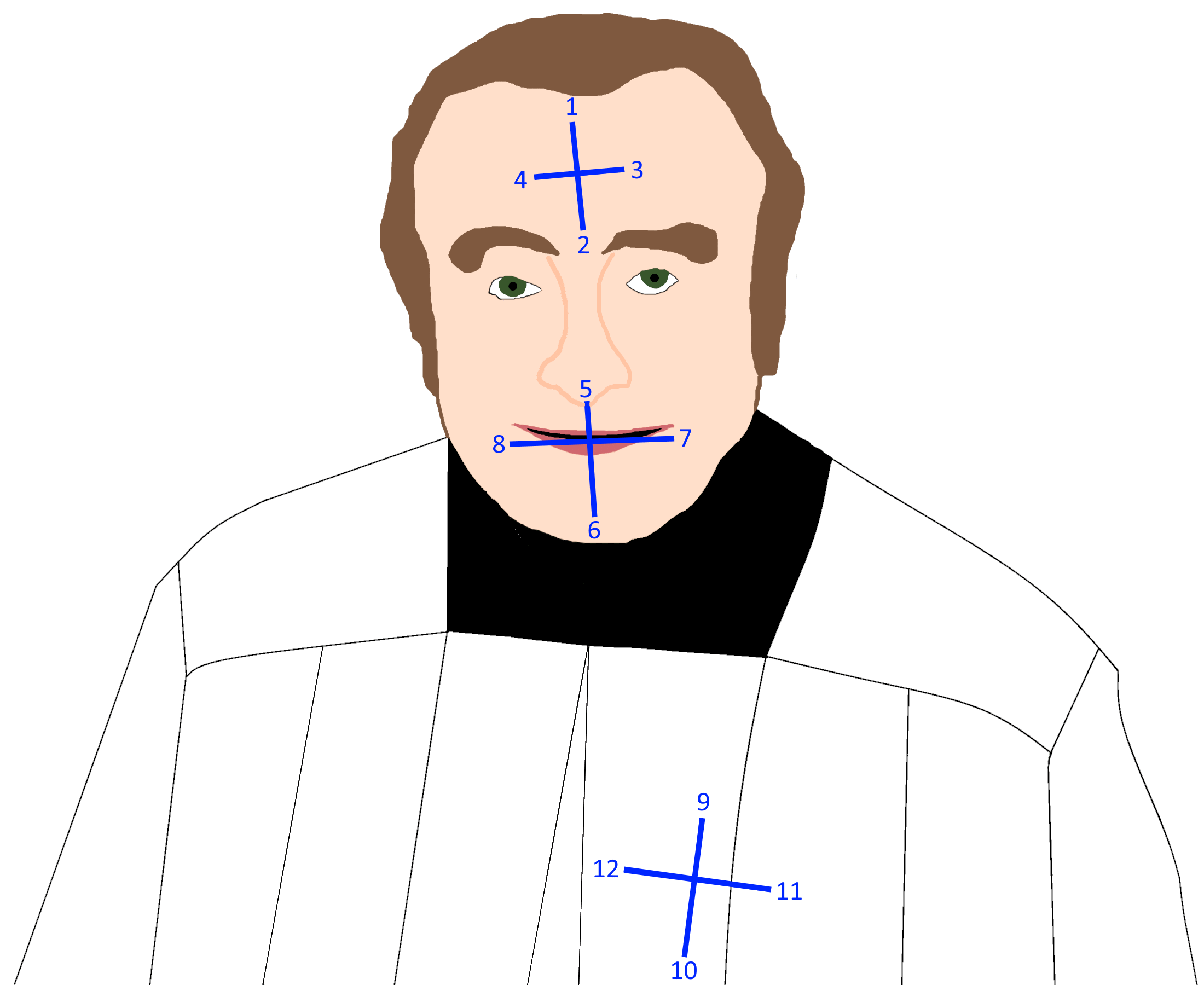
Visualisation of the lesser sign of the cross

The lesser sign of the cross is made before the reading of the Gospel at Eucharist with the thumb of the right hand on the forehead, on the lips and on the breast, just over the heart. In Western Christianity, the horizontal line is done from the left to the right. Before doing the lesser sign of the cross during Eucharist, the celebrant usually makes a cross with his thumb on the Bible.

=== History ===
According to the German theologian Klemens Richter the crossing of the congregation when the Gospel is announced is "one of the oldest folk customs attached to the Eucharistic celebration". He traces the origin of crossing forehead, lips, and breast to the 11th century and sees it as "common practice since the 12th century". He references Jean Beleth (fl. 1135–1182), who said that he was "not ashamed of the gospel [whereby the forehead is regarded as the locus of shame]; I confess it with my lips and my heart." Fellow Catholic theologian Valentin Thalhofer shares this view and references Sicard of Cremona (1155–1215) and Durandus of Saint-Pourçain (1275–1332/1334) as further evidence for the firm establishment of this practise in the 12th century.

Valentin Thalhofer additionally references Sicard of Cremona and his work Mitrale as evidence for the – now abolished – practise of using thumb, middle and index finger for making the lesser sign of the cross in Western Christianity in the Middle Ages. This practise was used to signify the Trinity. That the right hand was always used for making the lesser sign, Thalhofer sees confirmed by Pseudo-Justin.

=== Interpretation ===
Richter gives two interpretations of the small sign of the cross: He explains that medieval commentators referenced Luke 8:12 and thus saw the crossing as a form of protection against the devil who tries to take away the word of God from the hearts of the believers. A more modern interpretation referenced is that given by Josef Andreas Jungmann (1889–1975), a Jesuit liturgist: Having in mind Romans 1:16 ("For I am not ashamed of the gospel"), the small sign of the cross is seen as a courageous confession of faith.

Michael Johnston, an Episcopalian rector, connects the sign to laying tefillin, denoting that the word of God will take residence within the person making the sign. Furthermore, he connects it with the prayer that God will be "in my mind, on my lips, and in my heart". The Anglican theologian Claude Beaufort Moss (1888–1964) sees the lesser sign as an "ancient practice, signifying that we belong to Christ". Valentin Thalhofer provides an interpretation that links the lesser sign with the trinity: God the Father is invoked by signing the forehead, Jesus by signing the lips and the Holy Spirit by signing the breast (heart).

== Usage ==
The small sign of the cross is used in Catholicism. The Roman Missal, the primary Roman Rite liturgical book for celebrating Mass, expounds in its general instruction that the lesser sign should be made before the Gospel reading:

134. At the ambo, the Priest opens the book and, with hands joined, says, The Lord be with you, to which the people reply, And with your spirit. Then he says, A reading from the holy Gospel, making the Sign of the Cross with his thumb on the book and on his forehead, mouth, and breast, which everyone else does as well. The people acclaim, Glory to you, O Lord. The Priest incenses the book, if incense is being used (cf. nos. 276-277). Then he proclaims the Gospel and at the end pronounces the acclamation The Gospel of the Lord, to which all reply, Praise to you, Lord Jesus Christ. The Priest kisses the book, saying quietly the formula Per evangelica dicta (Through the words of the Gospel).

— The Roman Missal, 3rd edition, p. 47 (recital 134)

In Anglicanism, the lesser sign of the cross is also used before the reading of the Gospel. While its use is widespread within the Episcopal Church, an Anglican denomination in the United States, making the sign is purely a matter of custom and personal piety and – as all signs of the cross in the Episcopal Church – not liturgically prescribed to the congregation by the 1979 Book of Common Prayer.
