= Faculty of Roman-Catholic Theology, University of Tübingen =

Coordinates: 48.5256631°N 9.0553935°E

Faculty of Roman-Catholic Theology Tübingen
- Katholisch-Theologische Fakultät Tübingen
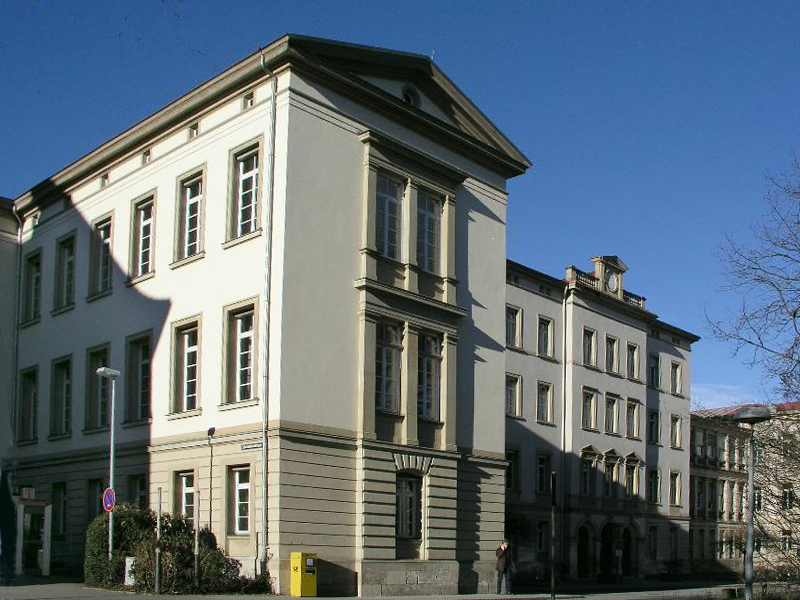
- Aula The Faculty is located in the Theologicum
- Established: 1817
- Parent institution: University of Tübingen
- Dean: Prof. Dr. Johanna Rahner
- Students: 232 (WS 2016/17)
- Location: Tübingen, Baden-Württemberg, Germany
- Website: Website of the Faculty

The Faculty of Roman-Catholic Theology (German: Katholisch-Theologische Fakultät) is one of the seven faculties of the University of Tübingen located in Tübingen, Baden-Württemberg in Germany. The faculty was founded in 1812 as the University of Ellwangen, but this newly-founded university was dissolved in 1817 and incorporated as a faculty of the University of Tübingen.

== History ==
Frederick I, Duke of Württemberg decided Ellwangen should be the site of a new Roman Catholic diocese, after the Bishopric of Constance had been dissolved in the course of German Mediatisation, and the Ellwangen Prince-Provostry was secularized. Hence a seminary, a diocesan chancery and Friedrich's University were founded in Ellwangen in 1812. After Frederick's death in 1816, his successor William I, King of Württemberg discarded the establishment of a Roman-Catholic diocese in Ellwangen, and decided Rottenburg should be the site of the new diocese. Therefore, the University of Ellwangen was closed and incorporated as a Faculty into the University of Tübingen in 1817.

Rottenburg had been an exclave of Austria for more than 400 years, until it became part of Württemberg by the Treaty of Pressburg in 1805. While the Reformation succeeded in Württemberg and Tübingen became Protestant, Rottenburg remained Catholic, and when Rottenburg became a part of Württemberg, it was the town with the highest Catholic population. The diocesan chancery was moved from Ellwangen to Rottenburg in 1817. In the same year, a seminary was founded in Rottenburg. In 1821, the Roman Catholic Diocese of Rottenburg was founded by Papal bull De salute animarum. As a part of the foundation of the Faculty of Roman-Catholic Theology, a hall of residence for theology students had to established. Therefore, the Wilhelmsstift was founded in 1817. It took the building of the former Collegium illustre.

Since its foundation in 1817, the Faculty of Roman-Catholic Theology has given rise to a number of important Catholic theologians. Among these were Johann Sebastian von Drey and Johann Adam Möhler, who founded the Catholic School of Tübingen, and Johann Baptist von Hirscher, who was a teacher at the School of Tübingen who had great influence in the domain of moral theology.

More recent professors within the faculty have included Joseph Ratzinger (later Pope Benedict XVI) and Hans Küng, who was withdrawn from the canonical mission because of his rejection of the doctrine of papal infallibility.

== See also ==
- Catholic Tübingen school
