= Patrizius Wittman =

Patrizius Wittman (b. at Ellwangen, Württemberg, 4 January 1818; d. at Munich, 3 October 1883) was a Catholic journalist.

Patrizius was the son of Johann Wittmann, a stonemason, and his wife Maria Anna Hirschle. His standing as a pupil in the Latin school of his native town gained him a free scholarship in the convictus attached to the Ehinger gymnasium, and eventually led to a similar scholarship in the Wilhelmsstift at Tübingen. Wishing to become a priest, he devoted his time at the university (1838–40) to theological and philosophical studies, gained three prizes, and passed a brilliant examination.

Wittman's strictly orthodox Catholic views, however, soon brought him into conflict with the Liberal tendencies then prevailing, and he was dismissed from the Wilhelmsstift. Through Caspar Riffel, professor at Giessen, he obtained employment on the journal "Sion", published at Augsburg under the editorship of Ferdinand Herbst, pastor of the town church. Johann Joseph Ignaz von Döllinger induced Wittmann to issue his "Die Herrlichkeit der Kirche in ihren Missionen seit der Glaubensspaltung" (2 vols., Augsburg, 1841), which was very well received. In 1841 he obtained the degree of Doctor of Philosophy and settled at Augsburg, becoming editor-in-chief of the periodical "Sion", and increasing its circulation. His marriage with a rich widow, Caroline Munding, of Dinkelscherben, bound him more closely to the city, and he remained there for thirty years. His "Allgemeine Geschichte der katholischen Missionen" (1846 and 1850) was the first treatment of this subject in German; the second volume of the work treats mainly of the conversion of Native Americans.

Wittmann was also largely instrumental in the founding of a motherhouse of the Sisters of Charity and of a hospice and home for workmen under the direction of the Capuchins. He was a noted speaker at conventions and other assemblies, and an active worker for churches and benevolent societies, and in many instances served as the guardian of widows and orphans. He was also a generous patron of young students.

After the death of his wife in 1869, Wittmann lived for ten years with his only son, first at Munich, then at Bamberg, and returning, in 1883, with his son to Munich, died there of apoplexy. He was buried in the Catholic cemetery at Augsburg. In recognition of his services Pope Pius IX gave him the Order of St. Gregory. The general board of managers of the Bonifatiusverein established at Merseburg an annual commemoration in perpetuity for him and his descendants.
