= Sign of the cross =

Ritual blessing made by members of some branches of Christianity

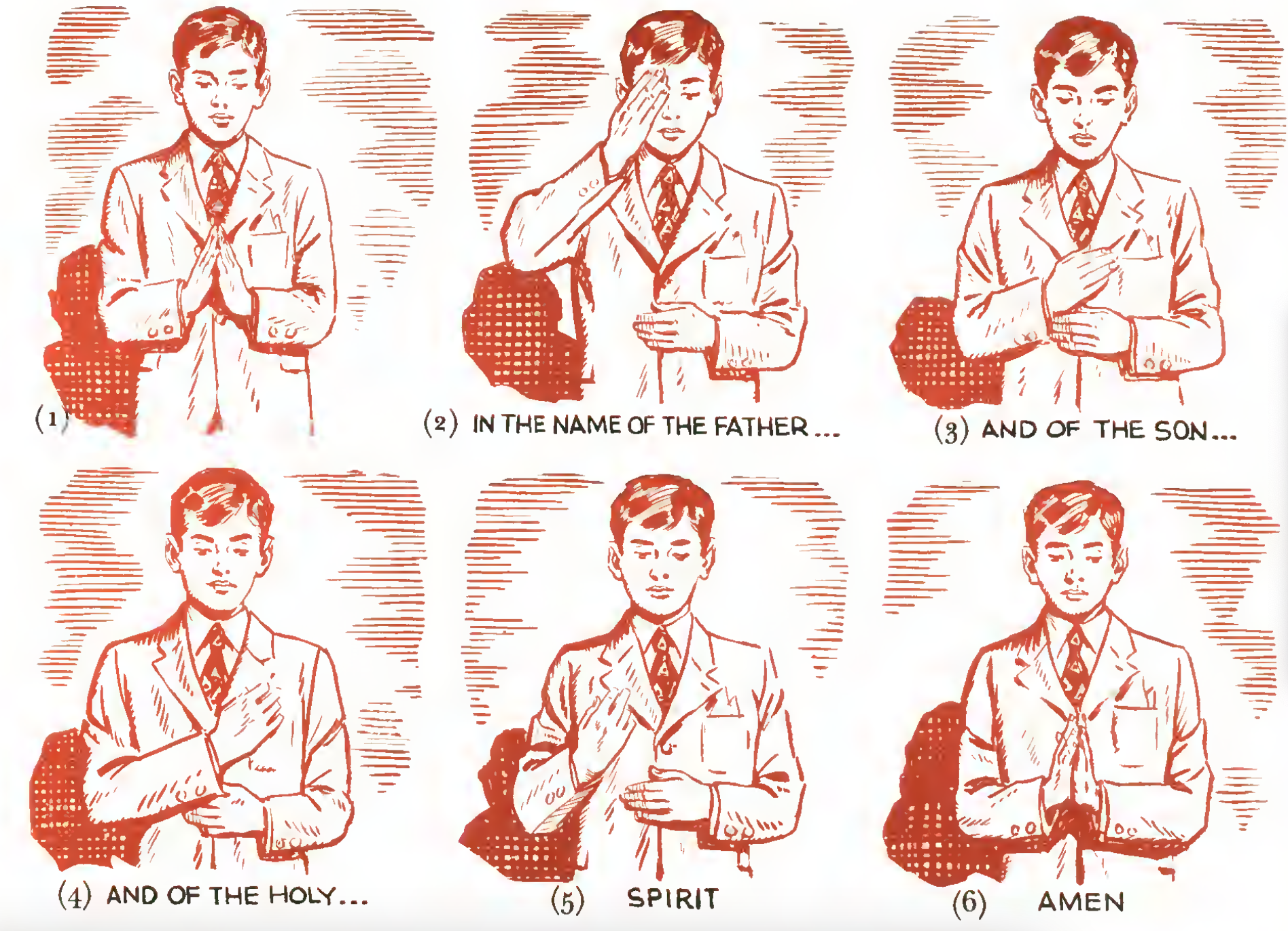
The steps for making the large sign of the cross in Latin Catholic and Protestant rites

An Evangelical-Lutheran priest makes the sign of the cross, along with the bride and groom being wed, during a Nuptial Mass in the Church of Sweden

Making the sign of the cross (Latin: signum crucis), also known as blessing oneself or crossing oneself, is both a prayer and a ritual blessing made by members of some branches of Christianity. It is a very significant prayer because Christians are acknowledging their belief in the triune God, or the Holy Trinity: God the Father, God the Son and God the Holy Spirit. There are three variants of the sign of the cross, including a large sign of the cross made across the body, a small sign of the cross traced on the forehead or objects, as well as a lesser sign of the cross made over the forehead, lips and heart.

The use of the sign of the cross traces back to early Christianity, with the third-century treatise Apostolic Tradition directing that it be used during the minor exorcism of baptism, during ablutions before praying at fixed prayer times, and in times of temptation.

The large sign of the cross is made by the tracing of an upright cross or Greek cross across the body with the right hand, often accompanied by spoken or mental recitation of the Trinitarian formula: "In the name of the Father, and of the Son, and of the Holy Spirit (or traditionally in English, Holy Ghost). Amen." The movement is the tracing of the shape of a cross in the air or on one's own body, echoing the traditional shape of the cross of the crucifixion of Jesus. Where this is done with fingers joined, there are two principal forms: one—three fingers (to represent the Trinity), right to left—is exclusively used by Christians who belong to the Eastern Orthodox Church, the Church of the East, Eastern Lutheran churches and the Eastern Catholic Churches in the Byzantine and Syriac Christian traditions; the other—left to right to middle, other than three fingers—used by Christians who belong to the Latin Church of the Catholic Church, Lutheranism, Anglicanism and Oriental Orthodoxy. The large sign of the cross is used in some denominations of Methodism and within some branches of Reformed Christianity.

The use of the small sign of the cross has been documented in early Christianity by Tertullian, an Ante-Nicene Church Father, who wrote in 204 CE in De Corona ('On Crowns'): "In all our actions, when we come in or go out, when we dress, when we wash, at our meals, before retiring to sleep we form on our foreheads the sign of the cross." Tertullian attested to the Christian practice of tracing this small sign of the cross on objects, such as one's bed before sleeping. It is traced on the forehead, or objects, with the thumb (sometimes using holy water or anointing oil). The small sign of the cross is made on the forehead during the rites of baptism and the anointing of the sick in Catholicism, Lutheranism and Anglicanism. In the Baptist, Methodist, and Pentecostal traditions of Christianity, the small sign of the cross is often made on the forehead of the recipient during ordinations, anointing of the sick and deliverance prayers. Christians of various denominations have traced the small sign of the cross onto doors or windows of their dwellings as a house blessing. The small sign of the cross is additionally used during certain observances, such as during the imposition of ashes on Ash Wednesday, in which ashes are marked on the forehead of a believer using the small sign of the cross.

Many individuals use the expression "cross my heart and hope to die" as an oath, making the sign of the cross, in order to show "truthfulness and sincerity", sworn before God, in both personal and legal situations.

== Origins ==
The small sign of the cross was originally made in some parts of the Christian world with the thumb of the right hand, being used on the forehead to bless oneself, along with being used to bless various objects, as attested by Tertullian, an Ante-Nicene Church Father. In other parts of the early Christian world it was done with the whole hand or with two fingers. Around the year 200 in Carthage (modern Tunisia, Africa), Tertullian wrote: "We Christians wear out our foreheads with the sign of the cross." He documented that Christians would trace the sign of the cross on their beds prior to sleeping. In the 4th century, the small sign of the cross was applied to various parts of the body. The 6th century saw the development of the large sign of the cross as a "four-point movement traced across the chest or in the air".

Hippolytus of Rome, in his Apostolic Tradition, recommends sealing oneself the forehead in times of temptation, with it being described as the "Sign of the Passion". Vestiges of this early variant of the practice remain: in the Masses of the Roman Rite in the Catholic Church, the Lutheran churches and the Anglican churches, the celebrant makes this gesture on the Gospel book and—together with the congregation—on his forehead, lips, and on his heart at the proclamation of the Gospel (known as the lesser sign of the cross); on Ash Wednesday the small sign of the cross is traced in ashes on the forehead; chrism is applied, among places on the body, on the forehead for the Holy Mystery of Chrismation in the Eastern Orthodox Church.

== Large sign of the cross ==
=== Gesture ===
The actual motion of the large sign of the cross is heavily disputed; the Eastern Orthodox state that the right to left motion to be the more ancient way whereas writings by Bar Salibi and other Syriac prose writers show that the left to right motion predates the right to left signage. Western Catholics (the Latin Church) and most Western Lutherans have made the motion from left to right, while Eastern Orthodox, Eastern Lutherans and Eastern Catholics (Byzantine rite), as well as some Western Lutherans, move from right to left.

In the Eastern Orthodox, Eastern Lutheran, Byzantine Catholic (Eastern Catholics), and some Western Lutheran churches, the tips of the first three fingers (the thumb, index, and middle ones) are brought together, and the last two (the "ring" and little fingers) are pressed against the palm. The first three fingers express one's faith in the Trinity, while the remaining two fingers represent the two natures of Jesus, divine and human. This gesture was also used in Western Europe into the high Middle Ages. Metropolis of Kiev and all Rus' Ephraim accused the Latin Church of using five fingers to make the sign of the cross in 1050s.

==== Motion ====
The large sign of the cross is made by touching the hand sequentially to the forehead, lower chest or stomach, and both shoulders, accompanied by the Trinitarian formula: at the forehead "In the name of the Father" (or In nomine Patris in Latin); at the stomach or heart "and of the Son" (et Filii); across the shoulders "and of the Holy Spirit/Ghost" (et Spiritus Sancti); and finally: "Amen".

There are several interpretations, according to Church Fathers: the forehead symbolizes Heaven; the solar plexus (or top of stomach), the earth; the shoulders, the place and sign of power. It also recalls both the Trinity and the Incarnation. Pope Innocent III (1198–1216) explained: "The sign of the cross is made with three fingers, because the signing is done together with the invocation of the Trinity. [...] This is how it is done: from above to below, and from the right to the left, because Christ descended from the heavens to the earth".

There are some variations: for example a person may first place the right hand in holy water. After moving the hand from one shoulder to the other, it may be returned to the top of the stomach. It may also be accompanied by the recitation of a prayer (e.g., the Jesus Prayer, or simply "Lord have mercy"). In some Catholic regions, like Spain, Italy and Latin America, it is customary to form a cross with the index finger and thumb and then to kiss one's thumb at the conclusion of the gesture.

==== Sequence ====
Cyril of Jerusalem (315–386) wrote in his book about the lesser sign of the cross:

Many have been crucified throughout the world, but by none of these are the devils scared; but when they see even the Sign of the Cross of Christ, who was crucified for us, they shudder. For those men died for their own sins, but Christ for the sins of others; for He did no sin, neither was guile found in His mouth. It is not Peter who says this, for then we might suspect that he was partial to his Teacher; but it is Esaias who says it, who was not indeed present with Him in the flesh, but in the Spirit foresaw His coming in the flesh.

For others only hear, but we both see and handle. Let none be weary; take your armour against the adversaries in the cause of the Cross itself; set up the faith of the Cross as a trophy against the gainsayers. For when you are going to dispute with unbelievers concerning the Cross of Christ, first make with your hand the sign of Christ's Cross, and the gainsayer will be silenced. Be not ashamed to confess the Cross; for Angels glory in it, saying, We know whom you seek, Jesus the Crucified. Matthew 28:5 Might you not say, O Angel, I know whom you seek, my Master? But, I, he says with boldness, I know the Crucified. For the Cross is a Crown, not a dishonour.

Let us not then be ashamed to confess the Crucified. Be the Cross our seal made with boldness by our fingers on our brow, and on everything; over the bread we eat, and the cups we drink; in our comings in, and goings out; before our sleep, when we lie down and when we rise up; when we are in the way, and when we are still. Great is that preservative; it is without price, for the sake of the poor; without toil, for the sick; since also its grace is from God. It is the Sign of the faithful, and the dread of devils: for He triumphed over them in it, having made a show of them openly Colossians 2:15; for when they see the Cross they are reminded of the Crucified; they are afraid of Him, who bruised the heads of the dragon. Despise not the Seal, because of the freeness of the gift; out for this the rather honour your Benefactor.

John of Damascus (650–750) stated:

Moreover we worship even the image of the precious and life-giving Cross, although made of another tree, not honouring the tree (God forbid) but the image as a symbol of Christ. For He said to His disciples, admonishing them, Then shall appear the sign of the Son of Man in Heaven Matthew 24:30, meaning the Cross. And so also the angel of the resurrection said to the woman, You seek Jesus of Nazareth which was crucified. Mark 16:6 And the Apostle said, We preach Christ crucified. 1 Corinthians 1:23 For there are many Christs and many Jesuses, but one crucified. He does not say speared but crucified. It behooves us, then, to worship the sign of Christ. For wherever the sign may be, there also will He be. But it does not behoove us to worship the material of which the image of the Cross is composed, even though it be gold or precious stones, after it is destroyed, if that should happen. Everything, therefore, that is dedicated to God we worship, conferring the adoration on Him.

Herbert Thurston indicates that at one time both Eastern and Western Christians moved the hand from the right shoulder to the left. German theologian Valentin Thalhofer thought writings quoted in support of this point, such as that of Innocent III, refer to the small cross made upon the forehead or external objects, in which the hand moves naturally from right to left, and not the big cross made from shoulder to shoulder. Andreas Andreopoulos, author of The Sign of the Cross, gives a more detailed description of the development and the symbolism of the placement of the fingers and the direction of the movement.

=== Use ===
==== Catholicism ====
Within the Roman Catholic Church, the sign of the cross is a sacramental, which the Church defines as "sacred signs which bear a resemblance to the sacraments"; that "signify effects, particularly of a spiritual nature, which are obtained through the intercession of the Church"; and that "always include a prayer, often accompanied by a specific sign, such as the laying on of hands, the sign of the cross, or the sprinkling of holy water (which recalls Baptism)." Section 1670 of the Catechism of the Catholic Church (CCC) states, "Sacramentals do not confer the grace of the Holy Spirit in the way that the sacraments do, but by the Church's prayer, they prepare us to receive grace and dispose us to cooperate with it. For well-disposed members of the faithful, the liturgy of the sacraments and sacramentals sanctifies almost every event of their lives with the divine grace which flows from the Paschal mystery of the Passion, Death, and Resurrection of Christ." Section 1671 of the CCC states: "Among sacramentals blessings (of persons, meals, objects, and places) come first. Every blessing praises God and prays for his gifts. In Christ, Christians are blessed by God the Father 'with every spiritual blessing.' This is why the Church imparts blessings by invoking the name of Jesus, usually while making the holy sign of the cross of Christ." Section 2157 of the CCC states: "The Christian begins his day, his prayers, and his activities with the Sign of the Cross: 'in the name of the Father and of the Son and of the Holy Spirit. Amen.' The baptized person dedicates the day to the glory of God and calls on the Savior's grace which lets him act in the Spirit as a child of the Father. The sign of the cross strengthens us in temptations and difficulties."

John Vianney said a genuinely made Sign of the Cross "makes all hell tremble."

The Catholic Church's Ordinary Form of the Roman Rite, the priest and the faithful make the Sign of the Cross at the conclusion of the Entrance Chant and the priest or deacon "makes the Sign of the Cross [i.e the lesser sign of the cross] on the book and on his forehead, lips, and breast" when announcing the Gospel text (to which the people acclaim: "Glory to you, O Lord").

The sign of the cross is expected at two points in the Mass: the laity sign themselves during the introductory greeting of the service and at the final blessing; optionally, other times during the Mass when the laity often cross themselves are during a blessing with holy water, when concluding the penitential rite, in imitation of the priest before the Gospel reading (small signs on forehead, lips, and heart), and perhaps at other times out of personal devotion.

==== Eastern Orthodoxy ====
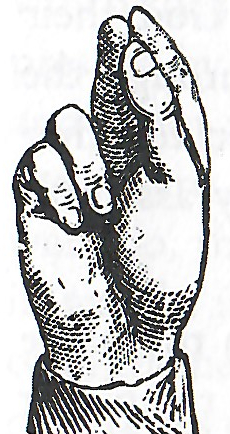
Position of an Eastern Orthodox person's fingers when making the sign of the cross

In the Eastern Orthodox Church, use of the sign of the cross in worship is far more frequent than in the Western churches. While there are points in liturgy at which almost all worshipers cross themselves, Orthodox faithful have significant freedom to make the sign at other times as well, and many make the sign frequently throughout Divine Liturgy or other church services. During the epiclesis (the invocation of the Holy Spirit as part of the consecration of the Eucharist), the priest makes the sign of the cross over the bread. The early theologian Basil of Caesarea noted the use of the sign of the cross in the rite marking the admission of catechumens.

===== Old Believers =====
In the Tsardom of Russia, until the reforms of Patriarch Nikon in the 17th century, it was customary to make the sign of the cross with two fingers. The enforcement of the three-finger sign (as opposed to the two-finger sign of the "Old Rite"), as well as other Nikonite reforms (which alternated certain previous Russian practices to conform with Greek customs), were among the reasons for the schism with the Old Believers whose congregations continue to use the two-finger sign of the cross (other points of dispute included iconography and iconoclasm, as well as changes in liturgical practices). The Old Believers considered the two-fingered symbol to symbolize the dual nature of Christ as divine and human (the other three fingers in the palm representing the Trinity).

==== Lutheranism ====
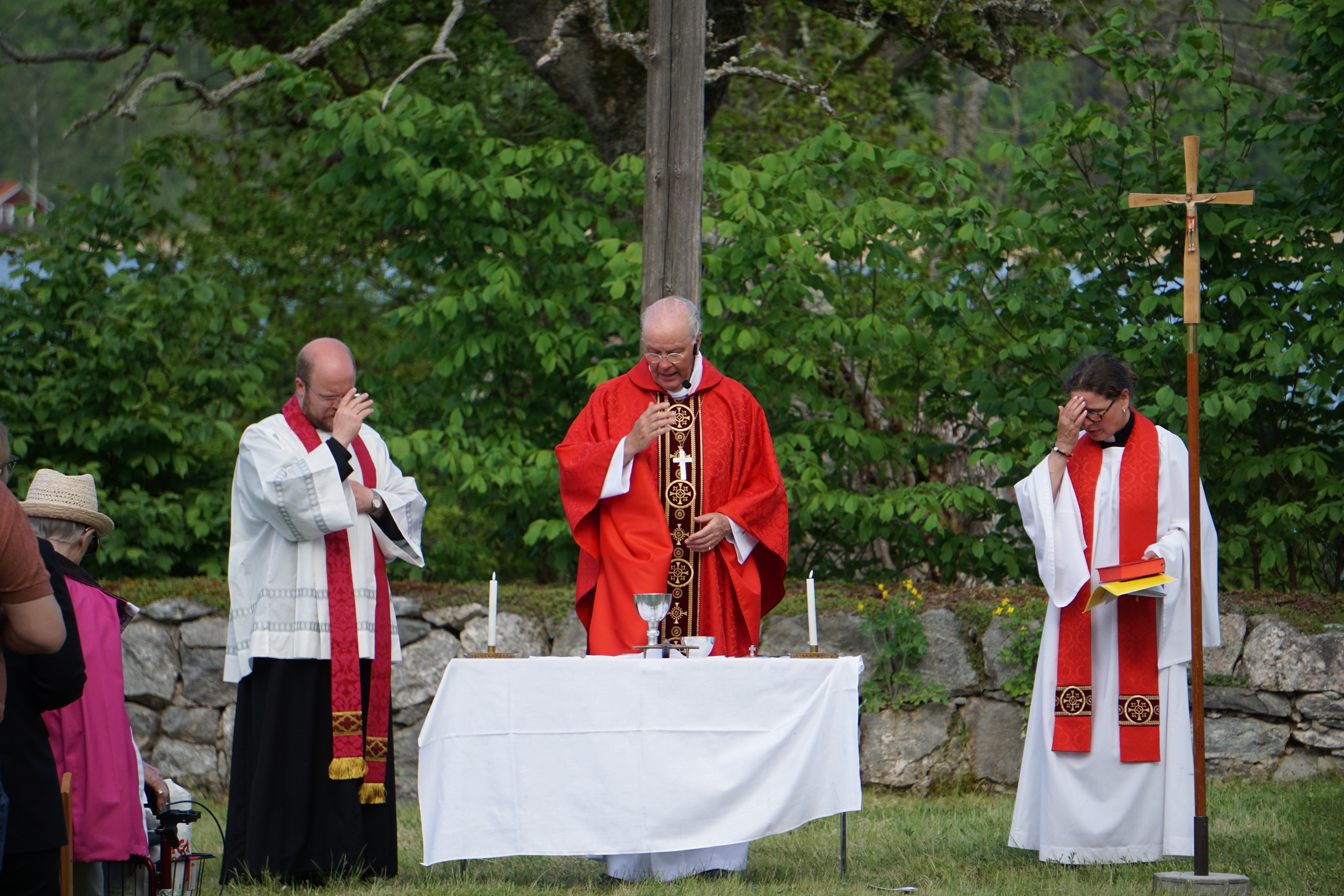
An Evangelical-Lutheran bishop and clergy of the Church of Sweden making the sign of the cross during the consecration at a pilgrimage Mass.

Among Lutherans, the use of the sign of the cross is normative and widespread. For example, Luther's Small Catechism states that it is expected before the morning and evening prayers. The Lutheran Hymnal (1941) of the Lutheran Church–Missouri Synod (LCMS) states that "The sign of the cross may be made at the Trinitarian Invocation and at the words of the Nicene Creed 'and the life of the world to come.'" In the present-day, the sign of the cross is customary throughout the Divine Service. Rubrics in contemporary Lutheran worship manuals, including Evangelical Lutheran Worship of the Evangelical Lutheran Church in America and Lutheran Service Book used by LCMS and Lutheran Church–Canada, provide for making the sign of the cross at certain points in the liturgy. The sign of the cross is made with three fingers, starting with touching the head, touching the chest (heart) and then going from the left shoulder to the right shoulder.

In the Lutheran churches, the lesser sign of the cross is made by the celebrant on the Gospel Book and on his/her forehead, lips, and breast when announcing the Gospel text (to which the people acclaim: "Glory to you, O Lord"). The faithful trace the lesser sign of the cross on their foreheads, lips, and hearts while praying "May the Word of the Lord be on my mind, on my lips, and in my heart".

==== Anglican and Episcopal traditions ====
The English Reformation reduced the use of the sign of the cross compared to its use in Catholic rites. The 1549 Book of Common Prayer reduced the use of the sign of the cross by clergy during liturgy to five occasions, although an added note ("As touching, kneeling, crossing, holding up of hands, and other gestures; they may be used or left as every man's devotion serveth, without blame") gave more leeway to the faithful to make the sign. The 1552 Book of Common Prayer (revised in 1559) reduced the five set uses to a single usage, during baptism. The form of the sign was touching the head, chest, then both shoulders.

The use of the mandatory sign of the cross during baptism was one of several points of contention between the established Church of England and Puritans, who objected to this sole mandatory sign of the cross, and its connections to the church's Catholic past. Nonconformists refused to use the sign. In addition to its Catholic associations, the sign of the cross was significant in English folk traditions, with the sign believed to have a protective function against evil. Puritans viewed the sign of the cross as superstitious and idolatrous. Use of the sign of the cross during baptism was defended by King James I at the Hampton Court Conference and by the 1604 Code of Canons, and its continued use was one of many factors in the departure of Puritans from the Church of England.

The 1789 Prayer Book of the Protestant Episcopal Church in the United States of America made the sign of the cross during baptism optional, apparently in concession to varying views within the church on the sign's use. The 1892 revision of the Prayer Book, however, made the sign mandatory. The Anglo-Catholic movement saw a resurgence in the use of the sign of the cross within Anglicanism, including by laity and in church architecture and decoration; historically, "high church" Anglicans were more apt to make the sign of the cross than "low church" Anglicans. Objections to the use of the sign of the cross within Anglicanism were largely dropped in the 20th century. In some Anglican traditions, the sign of the cross is made by priests when consecrating the bread and wine of the Eucharist and when giving the priestly blessing at the end of a church service, and is made by congregants when receiving Communion. More recently, some Anglican bishops have adopted the Roman Catholic practice of placing a sign of the cross (+) before their signatures.

==== Methodism ====
The sign of the cross can be found in the Methodist liturgy of the United Methodist Church. John Wesley, the principal leader of the early Methodists, in a 1784 revision of The Book of Common Prayer for Methodist use called The Sunday Service of the Methodists in North America, instructed the presiding minister to make the sign of the cross on the forehead of children just after they have been baptized. (This book was later adopted by Methodists in the United States for their liturgy.) Wesley did not include the sign of the cross in other rites.

By the early 20th century, the use of the sign of the cross had been dropped from American Methodist worship. However, its use was subsequently restored, and the current United Methodist Church allows the pastor to "trace on the forehead of each newly baptized person the sign of the cross." This usage during baptism is reflected in the current (1992) Book of Worship of the United Methodist Church, and is widely practiced (sometimes with oil). Making of the sign is also common among United Methodists on Ash Wednesday, when it is applied by the elder to the foreheads of the laity as a mark of penitence. In some United Methodist congregations, the worship leader makes the sign of the cross toward congregants (for example, when blessing the congregation at the end of the sermon or service), and individual congregants make the sign on themselves when receiving Holy Communion. The sign is also sometimes made by pastors, with oil, upon the foreheads of those seeking healing. In addition to its use in baptism, some Methodist clergy make the sign at the Communion table and during the Confession of Sin and Pardon at the invocation of Jesus' name.

Whether or not a Methodist uses the sign for private prayer is a personal choice, although the UMC encourages it as a devotional practice, stating: "Many United Methodists have found this restoration powerful and meaningful. The ancient and enduring power of the sign of the cross is available for us to use as United Methodists more abundantly now than ever in our history. And more and more United Methodists are expanding its use beyond those suggested in our official ritual."

==== Reformed tradition (Continental Reformed, Presbyterian, and Congregationalist) ====
In some Reformed churches, such as the Church of Scotland and Presbyterian Church (USA), the sign of the cross is used on the foreheads during baptism and the Reaffirmation of the Baptismal Covenant. It is also used at times during the Benediction, the minister will make the sign of the cross out toward the congregation while invoking the Trinity.

==== Armenian Apostolic ====
It is common practice in the Armenian Apostolic Church to make the sign of the cross when entering or passing a church, during the start of service and at many times during Divine Liturgy. The motion is performed by joining the first three fingers, to symbolize the Holy Trinity, and putting the two other fingers in the palm, then touching one's forehead, below the chest, left side, then right side and finishing with open hand on the chest again with bowing head.

==== Assyrian Church of the East ====
The Assyrian Church of the East uniquely holds the sign of the cross as a sacrament in its own right. Another sacrament unique to the church is the Holy Leaven.

== Small sign of the cross ==
The small sign of the cross has been documented in early Christianity by Tertullian, an Ante-Nicene Church Father, who wrote in 204 CE in De Corona ('On Crowns'): "In all our actions, when we come in or go out, when we dress, when we wash, at our meals, before retiring to sleep we form on our foreheads the sign of the cross." Tertullian attested to the Christian practice of tracing this small sign of the cross on objects, such one's bed before sleeping. It is traced on the forehead, or various objects, with the thumb (sometimes using holy water or anointing oil).

=== Anointing of the sick ===
During the Christian rite of the anointing of the sick, practiced liturgically in Catholicism, Lutheranism and Anglicanism, the small sign of the cross is traced on the forehead of the individual being anointed.

By tracing the sign of the cross on the forehead during the anointing, the priest indicates that all divine favors come to us through the salvific power of Christ, Who continues to be present with His Church, since "Christ is among us!" (Mt. 18, 20) And the faithful, in turn express their faith in Christ’s presence and assistance by answering, "He is and He shall be."

=== Exorcism and deliverance prayers ===
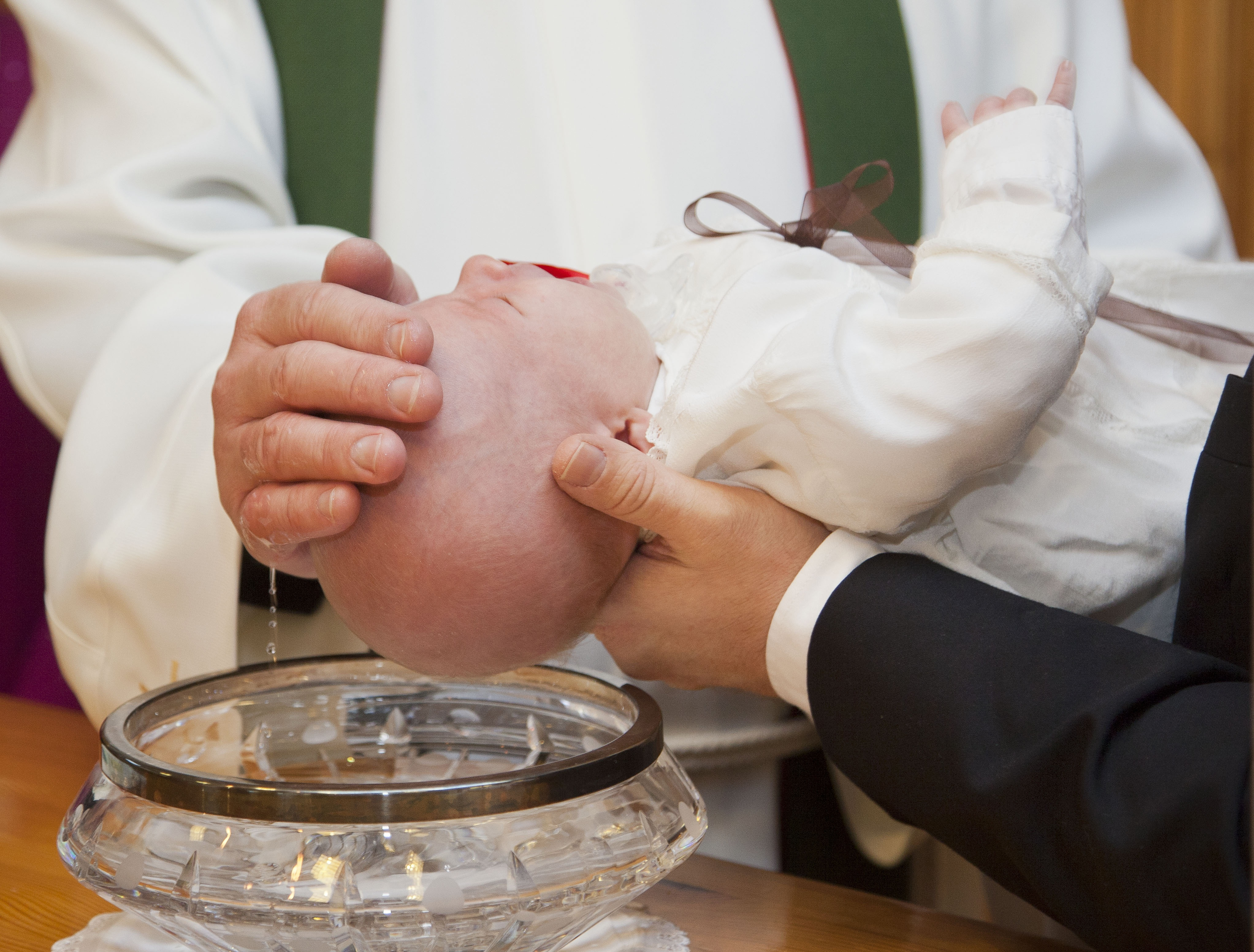
An infant being baptized in a Lutheran church

In the minor exorcism used in the Christian sacrament of Baptism, the Catholic Roman Missal (1911), Lutheran Baptismal Booklet (1526) and Book of Common Prayer (1549) enjoin the sign of the cross to be traced on the forehead of the baptismal candidate.

The Saint Michael Center for Spiritual Renewal led by Roman Catholic exorcist Stephen Joseph Rossetti provides deliverance prayers for the laity. Among these is the Prayer for Cleansing the Faculties and Senses, which enjoins the use of the sign of the cross to be traced on several parts of the body using holy oil or holy water.

=== Ash Wednesday ===
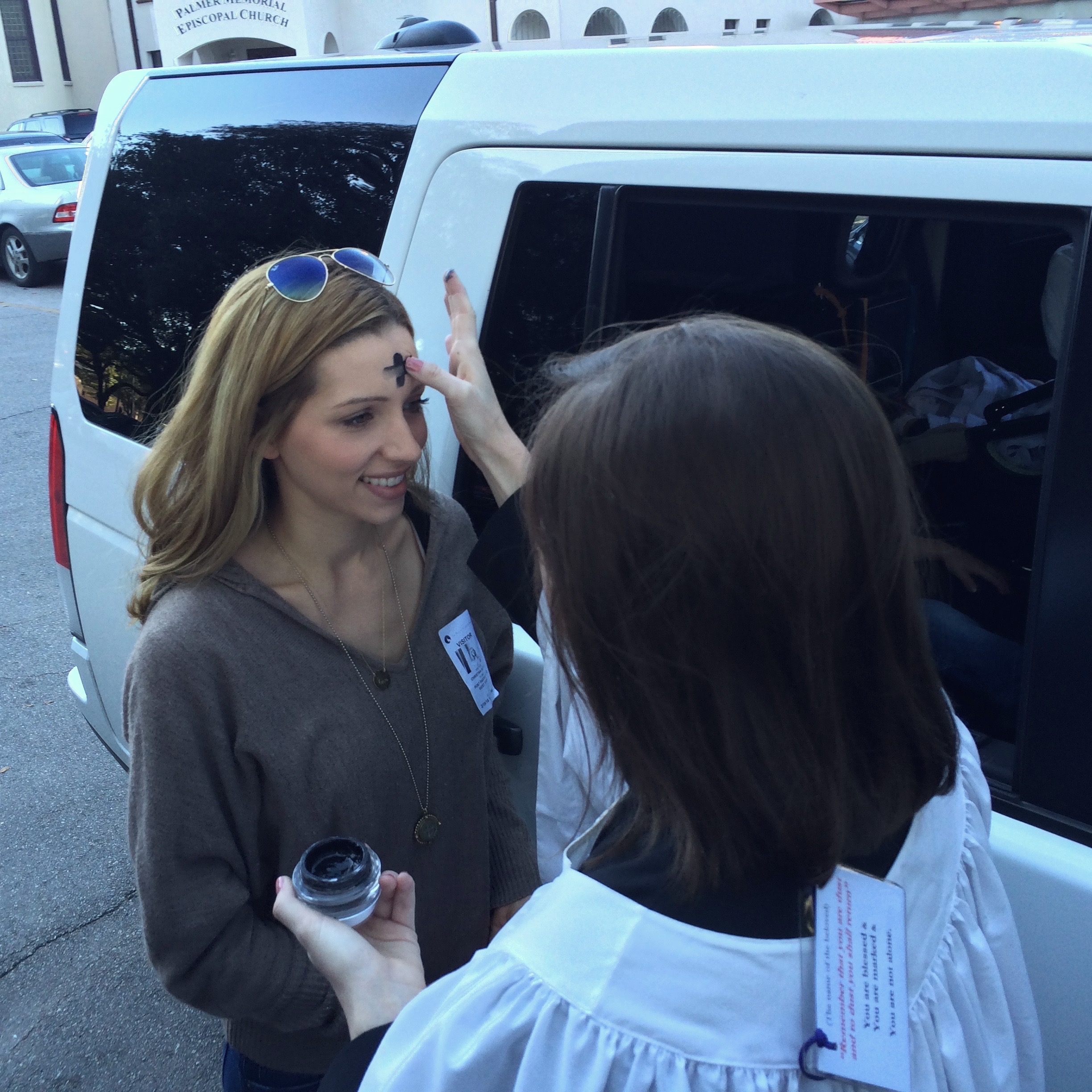
A woman receives a cross of ashes on Ash Wednesday outside an Episcopal church (2015).

On Ash Wednesday (the first day of Lent in Western Christianity), the sign of the cross is made by the celebrant on the forehead of believers during the ceremony of the imposition of ashes; this takes place in Latin Church Catholicism, Lutheranism, Moravianism, Anglicanism, as well as in a number of Reformed (Continental Reformed, Presbyterian, and Congregationalist), Methodist, Anabaptist, and Baptist churches, among others.

=== House blessing ===
Tertullian, an Ante-Nicene Church Father, attested to a Christian woman making the sign of the cross on her bed before sleeping. Christians of various denominations mark doors, windows and lintels of their house with the sign of the cross using holy anointing oil for a house blessing. Prayers such as the following are used for the same:

With the sign of this cross I am making a declaration that this house belongs to the Lord Jesus Christ that no sickness, death, thief or evil can enter this home. This oil is a symbol of the blood of Jesus Christ. No weapons that are formed against us or this property shall prosper and any destruction must pass over us, in Jesus name. We are safe and protected under the blood of Jesus.

== See also ==
- Christian symbolism
- Crossed fingers
- Lesser sign of the cross
- Mudras
- Prayer in Christianity
- Rushma in Mandaeism
- Veneration
