= Catholic Tübingen school =

School of Catholic theology

The term Catholic Tübingen school refers to the school of Catholic theology associated with the Faculty of Catholic Theology at the University of Tübingen, in the nineteenth century. Its main representatives were Johann Adam Möhler, Johann Sebastian Drey, Johann Baptist von Hirscher, and Johannes von Kuhn. Thomas O'Meara describes the school as "a school in the sense of Origen at Alexandria, of Abelard outside Paris, of Albertus Magnus in Cologne". The Catholic Tübingen school was one of the primary rivals to neo-scholasticism in the nineteenth century, though in the period following the First Vatican Council and the publication of the encyclical Aeterni Patris, its influence waned until being retrieved in the twentieth century.

== History ==
In 1817, the Faculty of Roman-Catholic Theology moved from Ellwangen to the University of Tübingen, which at the time had one of the strongest Protestant theological faculties in Germany; the city of Tübingen had no Catholic church at the time. In 1819, the faculty launched the journal Theologische Quartalschrift which was intended to give balanced commentary on contemporary theology and avoid polemics which would impede Catholic-Protestant dialogue. Theologische Quartalschrift is still published today and is the "longest-running Catholic theological journal in the world".

The intellectual influences of the Catholic Tübingen school can be traced to the German Enlightenment and Romanticism. It would be shaped by the reception of Immanuel Kant and Catholic Kantians, but ultimately rejected Kantianism in favor of post-Kantian German idealism. The thought of Friedrich Wilhelm Joseph Schelling proved especially influential to the Catholic Tübingen school.

The Catholic Tübingen school flourished in nineteenth-century Germany and has been compared to the work of John Henry Newman, who demonstrated familiarity with the school in his writings. It declined in influence after the Neo-Scholastic Joseph Kleutgen's critique of the school and the reform of Catholic theology departments after the publication of Aeterni Patris.

== Thought ==
The Catholic Tübingen school emphasized a Romantic understanding of ecclesiology influenced by German idealism, in contrast with the juridical Communitas perfecta ecclesiology associated with Robert Bellarmine and promoted by Neo-Scholastics. The theologians of the Catholic Tübingen school were particularly interested in reconciling Catholic theology with Schelling's philosophy of revelation, against the Kantianism of George Hermes and the Aristotelianism of the Neo-Scholastics, as well as the traditionalism of Louis Eugène Marie Bautain. They developed a theology of historical revelation which emphasized the spontaneous and organic nature of the Church, emphasizing the Church as an entity which undergoes development in history.

=== Johann Adam Möhler ===
Influenced by Hegel, Möhler authored an apologetic text entitled Symbolik which examined the confessional differences between Roman Catholic and Lutheran churches. It was heavily criticized by Ferdinand Christian Baur and David Friedrich Strauss. Möhler's ecclesiology and theology of history are found in Die Einheit in der Kirche (Unity in the Church), wherein he argues that Christianity is not simply salvation and knowledge but a Lebensprinzip (lit. 'life principle'). Möhler polemicizes against Gnosticism in this work and emphasizes the role of the Holy Spirit in the constitution of the Church.

=== Johann Sebastian Drey ===
Influenced by Schelling and Novalis's critique of Protestantism, Drey emphasized a vitalist theology of the Church as a living organism whose essence is not found in the authority of Scripture but in the Christian community.

=== Johann Baptist von Hirscher ===
Influenced by Drey and attempting to apply Drey's speculative theology to his own pastoral theology, Hirscher was a severe critic of Neo-Scholasticism but demonstrated little familiarity with medieval sources in his work. Hirscher's critique of Scholasticism led to a feud with Kleutgen, who defended an ahistorical Aristotelian scientific account of theology. Gerald McCool notes that Kleutgen in turn did not understand the theology of the Catholic Tübingen school.

=== Johannes von Kuhn ===
Influenced by Schelling, Drey, and Möhler, Kuhn continued to develop a theology of historical revelation along the lines of the aforementioned thinkers. He critiqued Schelling and Hegel along the lines of orthodox Trinitarian theology and a traditional understanding of divine revelation being found in God's word and the Church. Kuhn's epistemology has been compared to that of John Henry Newman. Kuhn emphasizes history as the "Grundcharakter and Urelement" of Christianity.

== Reception ==
Yves Congar is considered the primary representative of the Catholic Tübingen school in the twentieth century. Walter Kasper, who served on the Faculty of Roman Catholic theology at Tübingen from 1958 to 1961, is another contemporary heir to the school of thought. Contemporary scholarship has compared the theology of the Tübingen school to both that of John Henry Newman as well as that of Yves de Montcheuil, a Jesuit and French resistant whose ecclesiology has been argued to be a prototype of liberation theology.

== See also ==
- Ferdinand Christian Baur – leader of the (Protestant) Tübingen school

== Cited sources ==
- Kaplan, Grant (2006). Answering the Enlightenment: The Catholic Recovery of Historical Revelation. Crossroad Publishing Company. ISBN 9780824523640.
- Kaplan, Grant; Coolman, Holly T. (2018). "The Development of Doctrine: The Tübingen School and John Henry Newman". In Ayres, Lewis; Volpe, Medi A. (eds.). The Oxford Handbook of Catholic Theology. Oxford: OUP. p. 612-629. doi:10.1093/oxfordhb/9780199566273.013.45. ISBN 9780191749926.
- Kirwan, Jon (2018). An Avant-garde Theological Generation: The Nouvelle Theologie and the French Crisis of Modernity. Oxford University Press. ISBN 978-0198819226.
- Lee, James A. (2016). "Shaping Reception: Yves Congar's Reception of Johann Adam Möhler". New Blackfriars. 97 (1072): 693–712. doi:10.1111/nbfr.12142.
- Loewe, William P. (January 1980). "The New Catholic Tübingen Theology of Walter Kasper: Foundational Issues". The Heythrop Journal. 21 (1): 30–49. doi:10.1111/j.1468-2265.1980.tb01126.x.
- McCool, Gerald (1989). Nineteenth Century Scholasticism: The Search for a Unitary Method. Fordham University Press. ISBN 9780823212576.
- Newman, John Henry (1850). "Lecture 2. The Movement of 1833 Foreign to the National Church". Newman Reader. The National Institute for Newman Studies.
- O'Meara, Thomas (1982). Romantic Idealism and Roman Catholicism: Schelling and the Theologians. University of Notre Dame Press. ISBN 9780268016104.
- Shortall, Sarah (2021). Soldiers of God in a Secular World: Catholic Theology and Twentieth-Century French Politics. Harvard University Press. ISBN 9780674980105.
