= Paul Wengert =

German politician

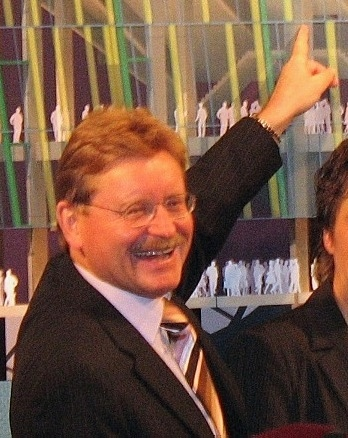
Paul Wengert.

Dr. Paul Wengert (born November 18, 1952, in Ellwangen) was the mayor of Füssen (1990-2002). From 2002 to 2008 he was the Mayor of Augsburg in the state of Bavaria in Germany. Since 2008 he is a member of the Landtag of Bavaria. He is a member of the Social Democratic Party.

In 2006 he was one of the finalists for World Mayor and finished in sixth place.
