= 2018 Ellwangen police raid =

A police raid in Ellwangen, Germany, on 30 April 2018 led to clashes between the German police and migrants living there. A second raid was conducted on 3 May 2018, in which 12 people were injured. The case received national as well as international media attention, sparking the public debate about migrant integration and the deportation process.

== Background ==
The migrant reception center "Landeserstaufnahmeeinrichtung Ellwangen" (LEA) was established in April 2015 in some buildings of the Reinhardt-Kaserne in Ellwangen, a former military facility. Immigrants who arrive in the administrative district of Stuttgart are brought to this center for their registration, health checks and the start of an asylum procedure. They usually stay for some weeks in Ellwangen, before they are assigned to other towns. The facility was once planned to have a capacity of 500 - 1000 inhabitants.

== Incidents ==
In the morning hours of Monday, 30 April 2018, four police officers went with two patrol cars to the migrant reception center to arrest the 23-year-old Yussif O., an asylum seeker from Togo, who was scheduled for deportation to Italy. They found Yussif O. in the center and arrested him. When the officers tried to leave the site, they were surrounded by about 150 migrant reception residents who threatened them and damaged one police car, preventing the police officers from leaving. Alassa Mfouapon, from Cameroon, co-organized the asylum seekers, " It would have taken hours for police reinforcements to arrive..

Three days later a second raid was conducted with hundreds of policemen to re-establish the rule of law. They arrested Yussif O. In addition, several persons suspected of drugs offences were arrested, and 17 residents were moved of the hostel, home to around 500 mostly African asylum seekers, to other locations. 27 asylum seekers offered resistance, while some were injured, when they jumped out of the windows. 292 people were checked, twelve people were injured in total, among these one police officer.

Bernhard Weber, the vice president of the Ellwangen police regional authority (German: Vizepräsident des Polizeipräsidiums Ellwangen), said they acted because of concerns that a "lawless area with organised structures" was developing at the shelter.

== Aftermath ==
On 8 May 2018, the Stuttgart Administrative Court ruled that the deportation order for the man from Togo to Italy was legal. O. then called the Federal Constitutional Court. On 14 May 2018, the Constitutional Court ruled that O. could be deported, and he was deported to Italy subsequently. Die Zeit reported his case and that he arrived in Milan, but Die Welt reported that he was in Rome and homeless; It was discovered by police in Milan that he was not a Togo national and that he wanted to go back to his homeland Ghana.

On 10 May, the inhabitants of the shelter offered a press conference. Alassa Mfouapon said: "We are not criminals."

On 11 May, African inhabitants of the migrant shelter in Ellwangen held a small march to protest deportations, joined by "a few greying activists" from the Marxist–Leninist Party of Germany.

Alassa Mfouapon, the co-organizer of the 30 April insurrection event, was deported to Italy, but returned to Germany a few months later and now lives in Karlsruhe. In a reportage by public broadcaster Südwestrundfunk, it was said Mfouapon might not be an instigator of rebellion, but only a resister who is now back in Germany.

== Reactions ==
Reacting to the legal proceedings led by Yussif O. and his lawyer, Alexander Dobrindt (CSU) spoke of an "anti-deportation industry", working to prevent legal deportations. This was heavily criticized by the German Bar Association, and complaints against him were made by some lawyers. Dobrindt hardened his criticism, speaking of "deportation saboteurs". The Left, a German political party, accused Dobrindt of "poisoning" the "social peace", while Baden-Württemberg deputy Minister President Thomas Strobl (CDU) expressed his support for Dobrindt and called his criticism "comprehensible". As a consequence of the case, other CDU politicians, such as Saxony Minister President Michael Kretschmer demanded a reduction in development aid for countries that fail to cooperate with deportations. Armin Schuster (CDU) stated: "In our constitutional state, there are clear red lines, which are now deliberately exceeded almost daily by asylum seekers." He demanded quicker deportations for criminal asylum seekers.

Winfried Kretschmann (Greens), Minister President of Baden-Württemberg, thanked the police, adding: "We do not tolerate any legal vacuum, and this attack on police officers must be punished". As a consequence of the events, Irene Mihalic of the Green Party criticized plans of the Federal government, especially the Interior Ministry, to establish "anchor centres" (Ankerzentren) for migrants, which are planned by the government to organize faster deportations.
