= Franz Xaver Reithmayr =

German Catholic theologian (1809–1871)

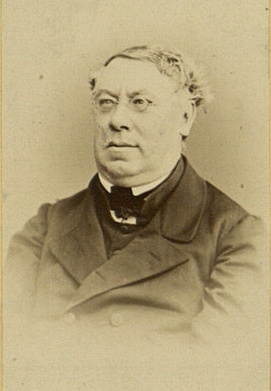
Reithmayr in 1870

Franz Xaver Reithmayr (16 March 1809 – 26 January 1872) was a German Catholic theologian who specialized in New Testament exegesis. He was born in Illkofen, located near Regensburg.

== Biography ==
Born 16 March 1809, he studied theology in Regensburg and at the Ludwig-Maximilians-Universität München. In 1832, he received his ordination, and for a period of time taught classes at the Latin School in Regensburg. Afterwards, he returned to Munich and continued his studies under theologian Johann Adam Möhler, who was a profound influence to Reithmayr's career. After Möhler's death in 1838, he edited and published his mentor's "Patrologie oder christliche Literärgeschichte" (Patrology or Christian literary history).

In 1836, he earned his doctorate in theology, and in 1841, was appointed a full professor of New Testament exegesis at the Catholic Theological Faculty of the Ludwig-Maximilians-Universität München, a position he maintained until his death. In 1869, he became an editor of the "Bibliothek der Kirchenväter" (Library of the Church Fathers).

== Works ==
- Commentar zum Briefe an die Römer (Commentary on the Epistle to the Romans), Regensburg (1843).
- Einleitung in die canonischen Bücher des Neuen Bundes (Introduction to the canon of the New Testament books), Regensburg (1852).
- Commentar zum Briefe an die Galater (Commentary on the Epistle to the Galatians), Münich (1865).
- Lehrbuch der biblischen Hermeneutik (Textbook of Biblical hermeneutics), (1874); edited and published by Valentin Thalhofer (1825-1891).
