= Caspar Riffel =

German Catholic historian

Caspar Riffel (January 19, 1807, Budesheim, Bingen, Germany – December 15, 1856) was a Catholic historian.

== Biography ==
Riffel studied under Heinrich Klee at Mainz and Bonn and under Johann Adam Möhler at Tübingen. After his ordination to the priesthood (18 Dec., 1830) he was named assistant priest at Bingen. In 1835 he was appointed to a parish in Giessen, and to the chair of moral theology in the local theological faculty. His transfer to the professorship in church history followed in 1837.

The publication of the first volume of his church history in 1841 aroused a storm of indignation among Protestants, to whom his unflattering account of the Protestant Reformation was distasteful. The Hessian government hastened to retire him (19 Nov., 1842). This measure caused intense indignation among the diocesan Catholic clergy, who denounced the Protestant atmosphere of the university. Riffel retired to Mainz, where in 1851 Bishop von Ketteler appointed him professor of church history in his newly organized ecclesiastical seminary.

== Publications ==
- Geschichtliche Darstellung des Verhältnisses zwischen Kirche und Staat ("Historical representation of the relationship between Church and State"), Mainz, 1836;
- Predigten auf alle Sonn- und Festtage des Jahres, Mainz, 1839–40, 3rd ed., 1854;
- Christliche Kirchengeschichte der neuesten Zeit (Recent history of the Christian Church), Mainz, 1841–46;
- Die Aufhebung des Jesuitenordens (The Rise of the Jesuits), 3rd ed., Mainz, 1855.

In Die Aufhebung des Jesuitenordens, Riffel argued against criticisms of the Jesuit order, denouncing writers such as Jules Michelet, Edgar Quinet, Joseph Streiter, and Franz Schuselka.
