= Claude Beaufort Moss =

Claude Beaufort Moss (1888 – 12 September 1964) was an Anglican (Church of England) theologian, ecumenist, and author.

He received his DD from Trinity College, Dublin in 1938. He served as a member of the Archbishop of Canterbury's Council on Foreign Relations from 1933 until his death. He taught at Scholae Cancellarii, Lincoln College, Lincoln and at St. Boniface Missionary College, Warminster. He also lectured as part of the Canterbury Series of Lectures.

== Published works ==
- The Christian Faith: An Introduction to Dogmatic Theology (London: SPCK, 1944)
- The Old Catholic Movement: Its Origins and History (London: SPCK, 1948).
- The Church of England and the Seventh Council (London: Faith Press, 1957)
- Answer Me This (New York: Longmans, Green, 1959)
- A Summary of the Faith (New York: Morehouse-Barlow, 1961)
- The Christian Faith, An Introduction to Dogmatic Theology Copyright 1943 SPCK (Wipf & Stock Publishers, Eugene, OR) First Published in 1943, Reprinted in 1944, 1946, 1947, 1949 and by Wipf & Stock in the USA.
