= Johann Adam Möhler =

German Roman Catholic theologian and priest (1796–1838)

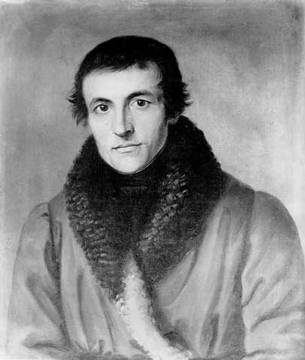
Johann Adam Möhler (ca. 1837)

Johann Adam Möhler (6 May 1796 – 12 April 1838) was a German Roman Catholic theologian and priest associated with the Catholic Tübingen school. His main area of theology was in the comparison of Catholicism and Protestantism.

He was born at Igersheim in the Bailiwick of Franconia of the Teutonic Order (from 1809 on part of Württemberg), and after studying philosophy and theology in the lyceum at Ellwangen, entered the University of Tübingen in 1817. Ordained to the priesthood in 1819, he was appointed to serve in Riedlingen. He returned to Tübingen where he became privatdozent in 1825, an associate professor of theology in 1826, and a full professor in 1828.

His lectures drew large audiences that included many Protestants. The controversy aroused by his Symbolik (1832) was such that in 1835, he left for the Ludwig-Maximilians-Universität München, because of polemics with the Protestant Tübingen theologian Ferdinand Christian Baur. In 1838, he was appointed to the deanery of Würzburg, but died shortly afterwards.

== Works ==
Möhler wrote:

- Die Einheit in der Kirche oder das Princip des Katholicismus, dargestellt im Geiste der Kirchenväter der drei ersten Jahrhunderte (Tübingen, 1825). English translation (1995): Unity in the Church or the Principle of Catholicism: Presented in the Spirit of the Church Fathers of the First Three Centuries, Peter C. Erb, trans., Catholic University of America Press, Washington, D.C., ISBN 0-8132-0621-9 ISBN 9780813206219
- Athanasius der Grosse und die Kirche seiner Zeit, besonders im Kampfe mit dem Arianismus. In six books (2 volumes, Mainz, 1827).
- Symbolik oder Darstellung der dogmatischen Gegensätze der Katholiken und Protestanten nach ihren Öffentlichen Bekenntnisschriften (Mainz, 1832; 8th edition, 1871–72; English translation by S. B. Robertson, 1843) This is a study of doctrinal differences between various Christian confessions. Central in this work is the anthropology and soteriology and the unity of the Church.
- Neue Untersuchungen der Lehrgegensätze zwischen den Katholiken und Protestanten (1834) – New studies of the doctrinal differences between Catholics and Protestants.
- Gesammelte Schriften u. Aufsätze, edited by Döllinger (1839)
- Patrologie, with Franz Xaver Reithmayr (1839).

A Biographie by Balthasar Wörner was published at Regensburg in 1866.

The Symbolik is his most famous work; the interest excited by it in Protestant circles is shown by the fact that within two years of its appearance it had elicited three replies of considerable importance, those namely of FC Baur, PK Marheineke and KI Nitzsch.

== Influence ==
Möhler died young, but was very influential for other theologians, such as Marie-Dominique Chenu, Henri de Lubac, Yves Congar, and others in the ressourcement movement at the time of the Second Vatican Council (1963-65).

As a church historian, he has a more confessional and conservative orientation and organic thinking.
