= Valentin Thalhofer =

German theologian

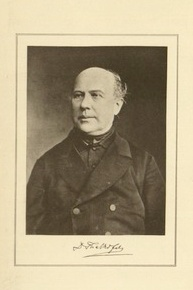
Valentin Thalhofer

Valentin Thalhofer (January 20, 1825 – September 17, 1891) was a German Roman Catholic clergyman and theologian.

== Biography ==
Thalhofer was born in Unterroth, near Ulm, on 21 January 1825; and died in the same place, on 17 September 1891. He took his gymnasial studies and philosophy in Dillingen, and from 1845 studied theology at the Ludwig-Maximilians-Universität München. In 1848, he received the degree of Doctor of Theology and was ordained priest. After this, he was a prefect at the seminary for priests in Dillingen (1850–1863), professor of exegesis at the lyceum of Dillingen (1863–1876), director of the seminary for priests, the Georgianum in Munich, and professor of liturgy at the Catholic University of Eichstätt-Ingolstadt, and in 1899 became the cathedral provost there.

He taught at the Georgianum, where he served as a teacher, confessor, preacher, catechist, and writer. Contemporary accounts described him as a respected educator, and his work at the institution was well received.

== Writings ==
His first publication was a prize essay in Munich on the bloodless sacrifice of the Mosaic worship (1848). In 1855, he wrote in the report of the Dillingen lyceum for that year, a dissertation on the doctrine of sacrifice contained in the Epistle to the Hebrews. In the same year he began a successful opposition to the pseudo-mysticism and Irvingism which were spreading in Swabia at that time. His chief work in this direction was the Beiträge zur Geschichte des Aftermysticismus und insbesondere des Irvingianismus im Bistum Augsburg (1857). His excellent commentary on the Psalms was very popular (first published in 1857; 7th edition, 1904). From 1860 until 1863, he edited the official publication of the Augsburg Diocese and brought it to greater prosperity.

Among the literary work done during his residence in Munich should be mentioned his editing of a Library of the Fathers in eighty volumes (1869–1888); a work on the sacrifice of the Old and New Covenants (1870); and the editing of the Lehrbuch der biblischen Hermeneutik of his deceased friend Franz Xaver Reithmayr (1874).

At the Catholic University of Eichstätt-Ingolstadt, he was commissioned by the bishop to revise the Rituale Romano-Eystettense, and in addition issued a smaller ritual as a manual for the clergy of the diocese (1879–1880). He then began his chief work, a large Handbuch der Liturgik which rests on a thorough study of the original authorities and is still indispensable. Of the special liturgies, he published himself in 1890 the Liturgie des heiligen Messopfers, and from the papers of the deceased Andreas Schmid, he added to this in 1893 the Liturgie des kirchlichen Stundengebetes, the Liturgie der Sakramente und Sakramentalien, and the doctrine of the church year. Adalbert Ebner began a revised edition of this work, but unfortunately no more has been published than the first section of the first volume (1894). Schmid also edited from Thalhofer's literary remains Die heilige Messe und das Priestertum der katholischen Kirche in 25 Predigten dargestellt (1893).

In addition to these larger works Thalhofer also wrote excellent articles for theological reviews and for the Kirchenlexikon of Freiburg.
