= Ellwangen =

- Town
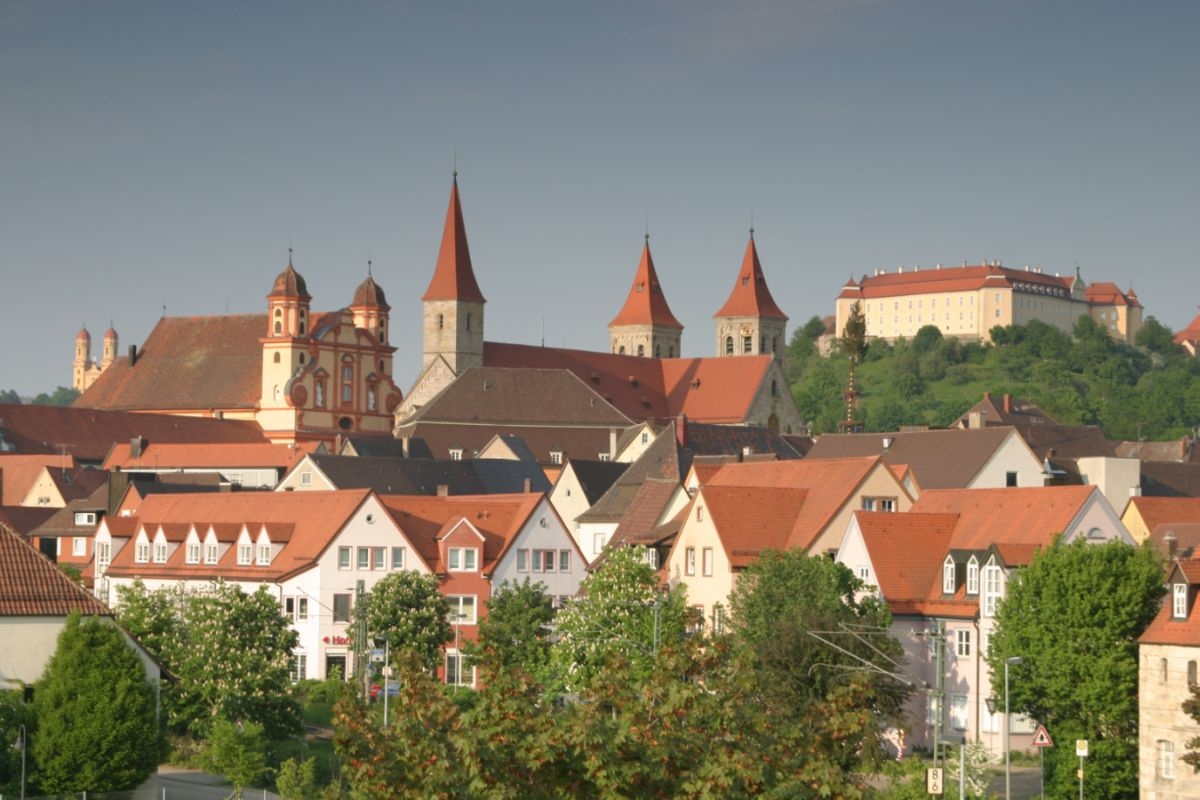
- General view of the town

- Coat of arms

- Location of Ellwangen within Ostalbkreis district
- Interactive map of Ellwangen
- Location within Germany Location within Baden-Württemberg
- Coordinates: 48°57′40″N 10°7′50″E
- Country: Germany
- State: Baden-Württemberg
- Admin. region: Stuttgart
- District: Ostalbkreis
- Subdivisions: Kernstadt and 4 Stadtteile

Government
  - Mayor (2019–27): Michael Dambacher (Ind.)

Area
  - Total: 127.38 km^{2} (49.18 sq mi)
- Elevation: 440 m (1,440 ft)

Population (2025-12-31)
  - Total: 24,589
  - Density: 193.04/km^{2} (499.96/sq mi)
- Time zone: UTC+01:00 (CET)
  - Summer (DST): UTC+02:00 (CEST)
- Postal codes: 73479
- Dialling codes: 07961, 07965
- Vehicle registration: AA, GD
- Website: www.ellwangen.de

Ellwangen an der Jagst, officially Ellwangen (Jagst), in common use simply Ellwangen (German pronunciation: [ˈɛlˌvaŋən]) is a town in the district of Ostalbkreis in the east of Baden-Württemberg in southern Germany. It is situated about 17 kilometres (11 mi) north of Aalen.

Ellwangen has 25,000 inhabitants.

== Geography ==
Ellwangen is situated in the valley of the river Jagst, between the foothills of the Swabian Alb and Virngrund (ancient Virgundia) forest, the latter being part of the Swabian-Franconian Forest. The Jagst runs through Ellwangen from south to north.

== History ==
The town developed in the 7th century as an Alemannic settlement in the Virgunna forest next to the Franconian-Swabian border. In 764 the Frankish noble Hariolf, Bishop of Langres, founded a Benedictine monastery, Ellwangen Abbey, on a hill next to the settlement. The monastery was mentioned in a document of Louis the Pious as Elehenuuwang in 814. It became a Reichsabtei in 817.

From 870 to 873 the Byzantine Greek "Apostle of the Slavs" Saint Methodius was imprisoned in Ellwangen, after he had been arrested by Ermanrich, bishop of Passau. He was set free in 873 thanks to the intervention of Pope John VIII.

The monastery was "exempt" from 1124 on (maybe earlier), which means it was directly responsible to the pope. The abbots were granted Reichsfreiheit in 1215. The office of Vogt was first held by the counts of Oettingen, from 1370 on by the counts of Württemberg. In 1460 the abbey was converted into an exempt house of secular canons, led by a prince-provost and a chapter consisting of 12 noble canons and 10 vicars. Initially its territory included the districts of Ellwangen, Tannenberg and Kochenburg. The district of Rötlen was acquired in 1471, Wasseralfingen in 1545, and Heuchlingen in 1609.

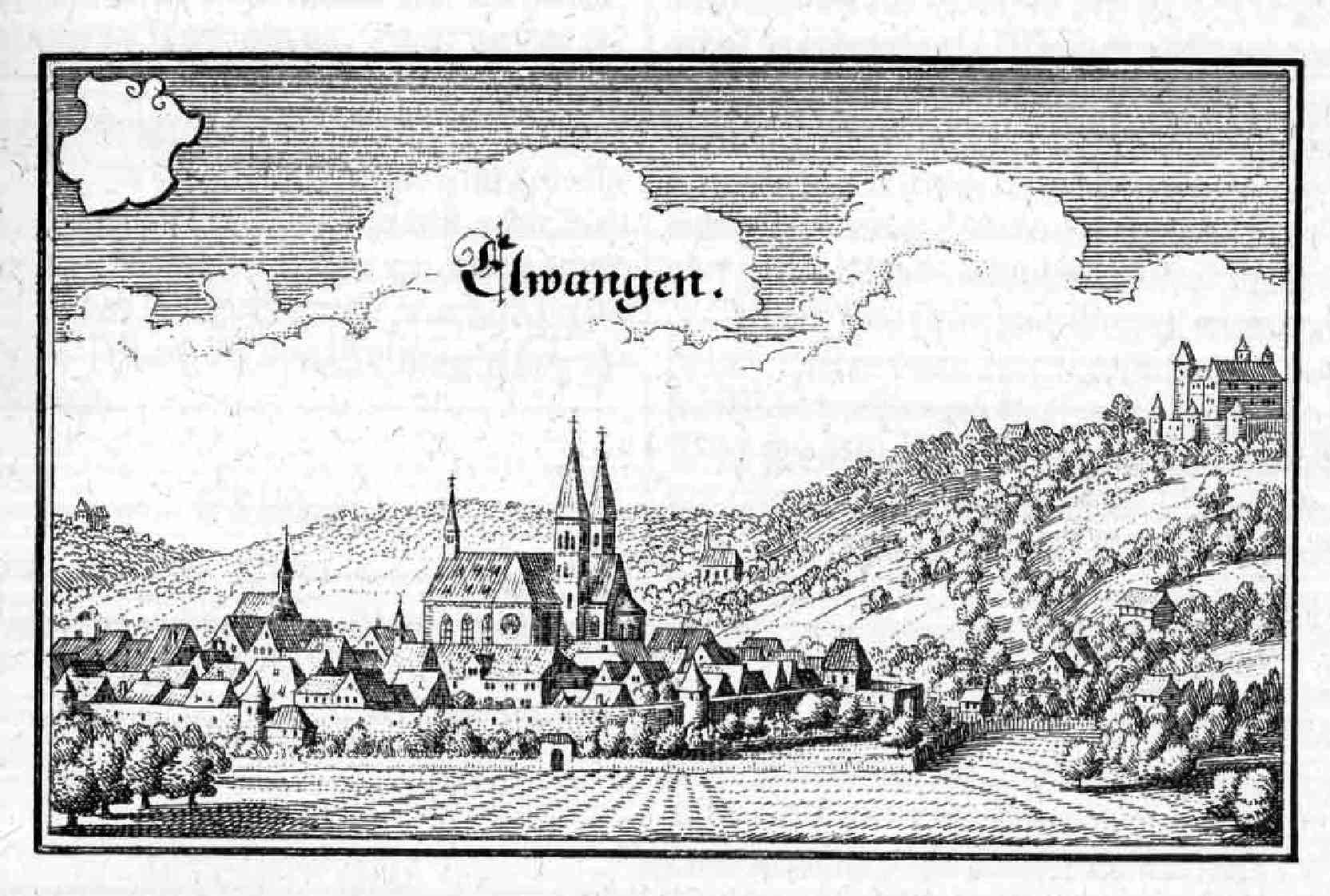
17th-century view of the town

In 1588 and from 1611 to 1618 about 450 people in Ellwangen were killed in witch-hunts.

After the German Mediatisation of 1802, Ellwangen became a part of the duchy of Württemberg. At first it was the government seat of Neuwürttemberg, the territories Württemberg had acquired by mediatisation. In 1803 the town became centre of a district (Oberamt), which in 1806 was included into the new Kingdom of Württemberg. In 1807 Ellwangen became seat of the Jagstkreis (Jagst District), until the district was merged into a larger unit in 1924. The king of Württemberg, who had acquired large areas with a predominantly Roman Catholic population, wanted Ellwangen to become the seat of a Roman Catholic diocese. To achieve this, in 1812 he founded an ordinary and a seminary, as well as a Roman Catholic theological faculty. The faculty was soon moved to Tübingen, where it became part of Eberhard Karls University. In 1817, the seminary and the ordinary went to Rottenburg am Neckar, which in 1821 became the seat of the newly formed diocese for Württemberg.

=== 20th and 21st centuries ===
During World War I, in 1916–1917, Germany operated a special prisoner-of-war camp for ethnic Polish officers from the Russian Army, with the aim of subjecting them to propaganda and conscripting them into a planned German-controlled Polish army to fight against Russia (Poland was partitioned between Germany, Russia and Austria at the time).

After World War II members of the 17th SS Panzergrenadier Division were convicted of a number of war crimes, involving the shooting of foreign concentration camp prisoners in Ellwangen during the war.

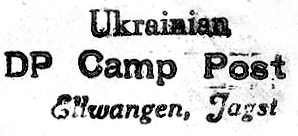
Postmark from the Ukrainian DP Camp in Ellwangen

In April 1945, US Army troops occupied Ellwangen and until 1946, stationed various Army units at the kaserne — the former German Tank School. From 1946 the International Refugee Organization (IRO) used the kaserne as a displaced persons' camp for 3,000 Ukrainian refugees until 1951. In 1951, the US Army — the combat engineer battalion and medical battalion of the 28th Infantry Division again took over the facility. In September 1955 the Americans returned the kaserne to the German government.

In April and May 2018, two police raids at a migrant shelter in the town led to national and international media attention and a public debate about legal deportations.

== Transport ==
Ellwangen is served by the Upper Jagst Railway which is operated by both GoAhead and Deutsche Bahn. There are also several regional bus lines operated by FahrBus Ostalb. Ellwangen also is a "City Stop" for the Inter-City Train line of Deutsche Bahn. Since 2014, a so-called Stadtbus Ellwangen was established. A Stadtbus only stops if requested by the passengers and was established for older residents and the population surrounding the historic center of the town.

== Buildings ==
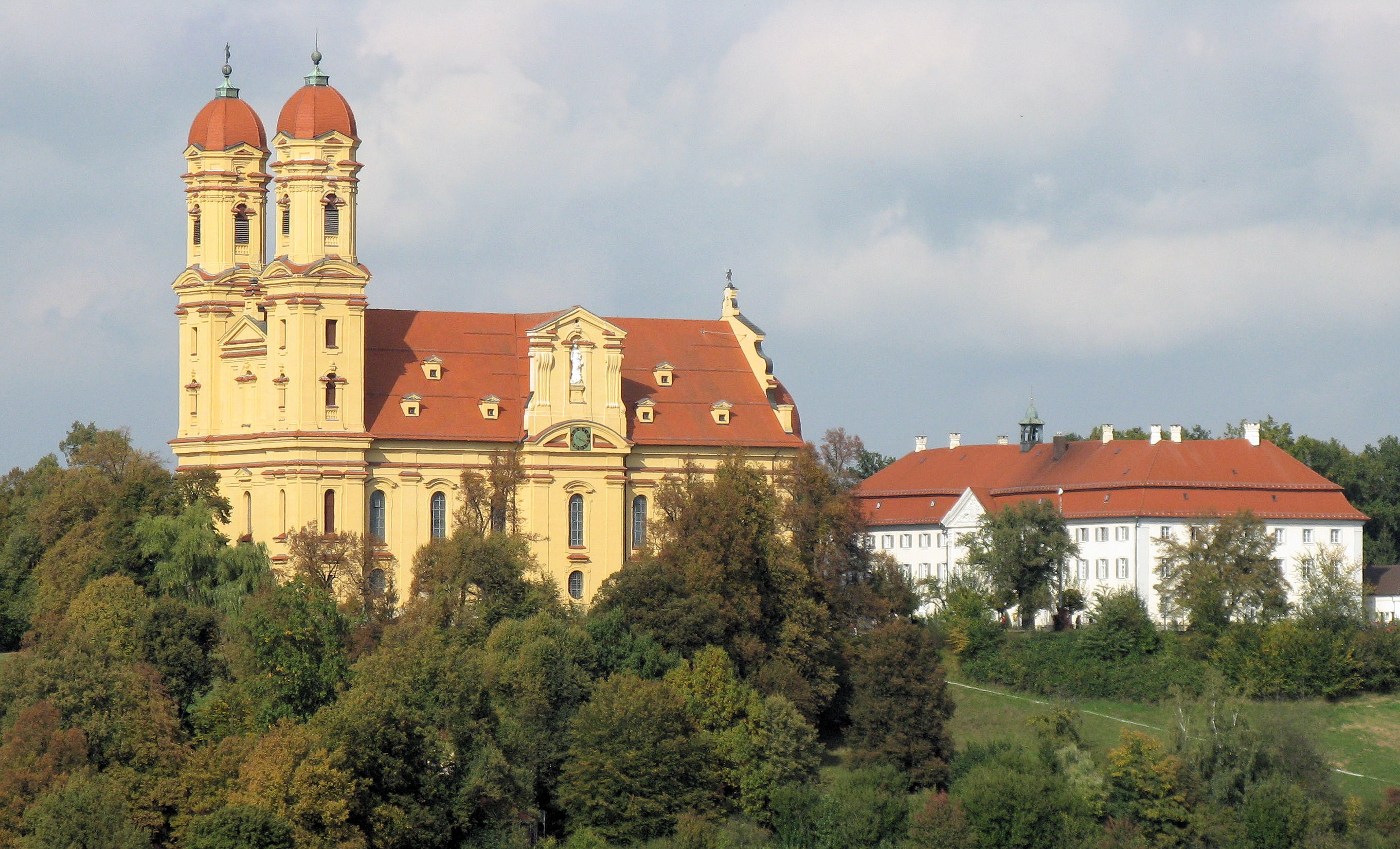
Schönenberg church

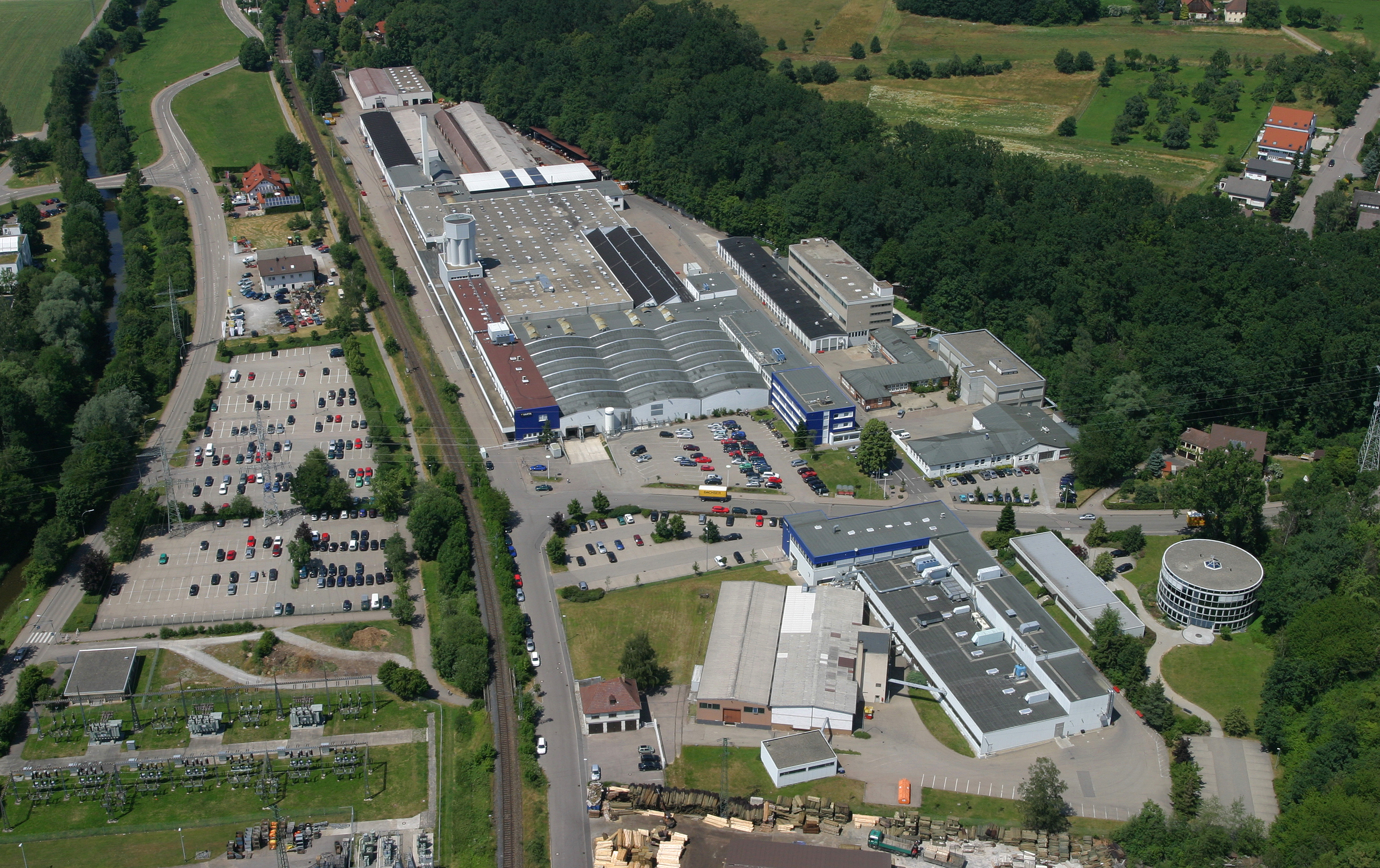
Ellwangen Varta Battery factory

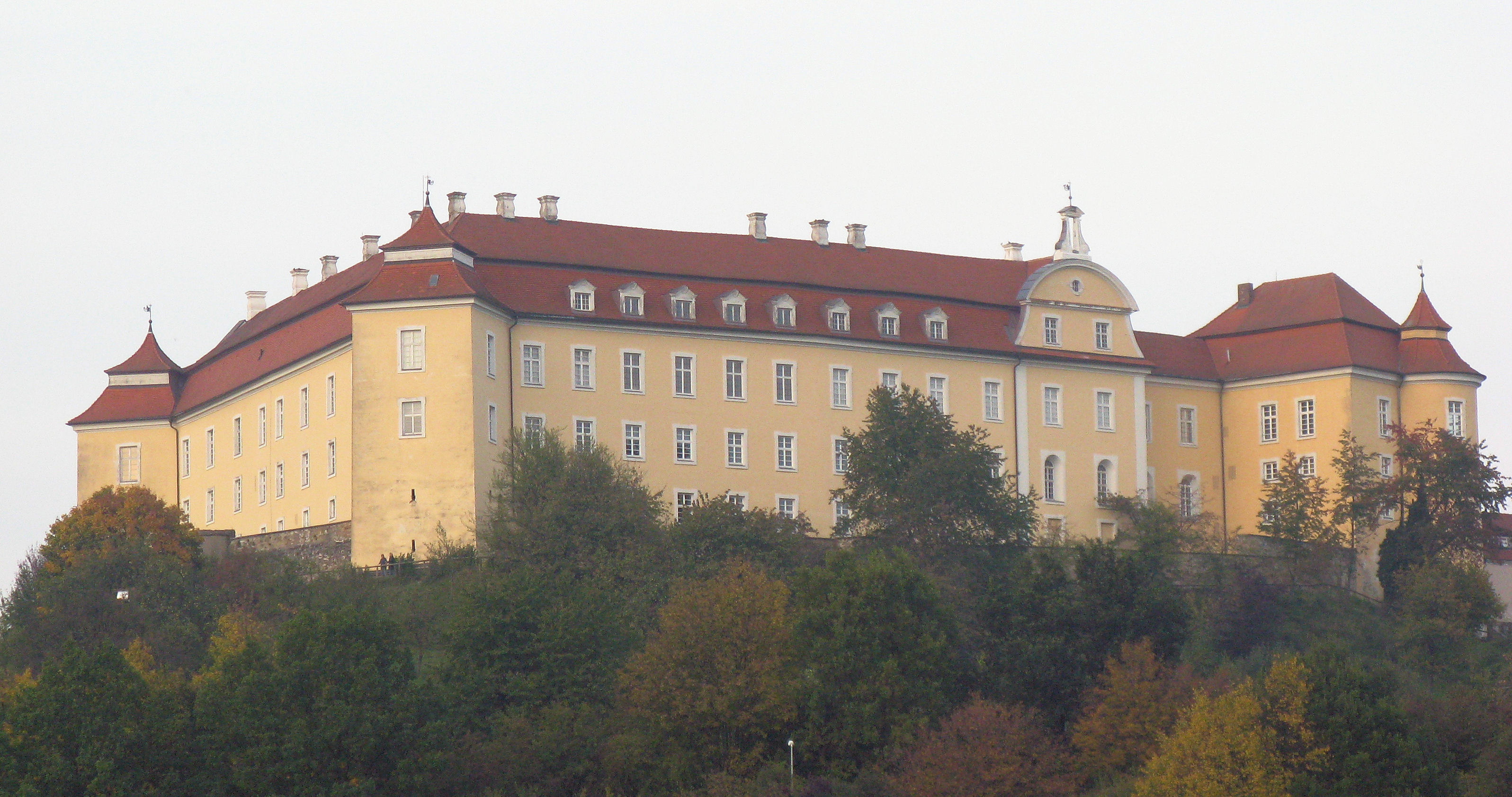
Ellwangen castle

Sights of the city are the medieval town centre with its churches, notably Ellwangen Basilica. Also well known are the Baroque pilgrimage church, Schönenberg, and the castle, both on hills near to the city.

== Mayors since 1819 ==
- 1819–1860: Ulrich Rettenmaier
- 1861–1881: Johann Leonhard Bayrhammer
- 1881–1903: Hermann Mayrhausen
- 1903–1933: Karl Ettensperger
- 1933–1942: Adolf Kölle
- 1942–1945: Friedrich Wilhelm Erbacher
- 1945: Hugo-Wilhelm Oechsle
- 1945–1946: Otto Schreiner
- 1946–1954: Alois Seibold
- 1954–1962: Alois Rothmaier
- 1962–1982: Karl Wöhr
- 1982–1995: Stefan Schultes
- 1995–2003: Hans-Helmut Dieterich
- 2003-2019: Karl Hilsenbek
- since 2019: Michael Dambacher

== International relations ==
=== Twin towns — Sister cities ===
Ellwangen is twinned with:

- Langres (Haute-Marne, France)
- Abbiategrasso (Province of Milan, Italy)

== Notable people ==
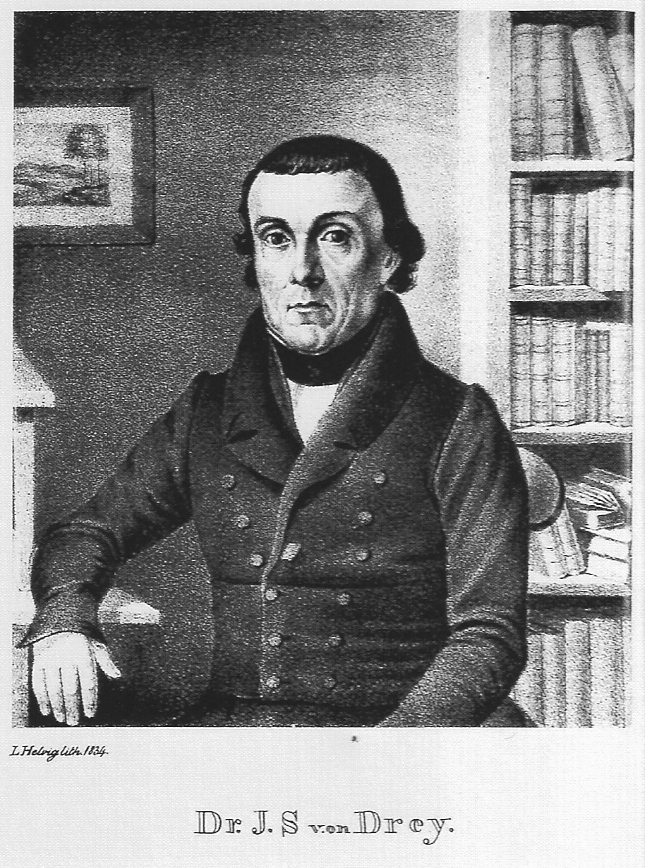
Johann Sebastian von Drey, 1834

- Wolfgang Benz (born 1941), historian and head of Center for Research on Antisemitism at Technische Universität Berlin 1990–2011
- Thomas Geisel (born 1963), politician (SPD), from 2014 till 2020; Lord mayor of Düsseldorf
- Bernd Grimm (born 1962), product designer, architectural model builder and artist.
- Philipp Jenninger (1932–2018), politician (CDU), president of the Bundestag from 1984 till 1988, diplomat
- Johann Sebastian von Drey (1777–1853), Catholic theologian and professor at the Ellwangen university.
- Bernardin Schellenberger (born 1944), Catholic theologian, priest and former Trappist
- Paul Wengert (born 1952), from 2002 till 2008 lord mayor of Augsburg
- Patrizius Wittman (1818–1883), a Catholic journalist.
- Magnoald Ziegelbauer (1689–1750), a Benedictine monk and ecclesiastical historian.

=== Sport ===
- Erwin Hadewicz (born 1951), retired footballer, played over 250 games
- Stefan Kohn (born 1965), former footballer who played 305 games
- Florian Lechner (born 1981), former footballer who played 200 games
