= Martín de Azpilcueta =

Spanish economist and Catholic theologian (1492–1586)

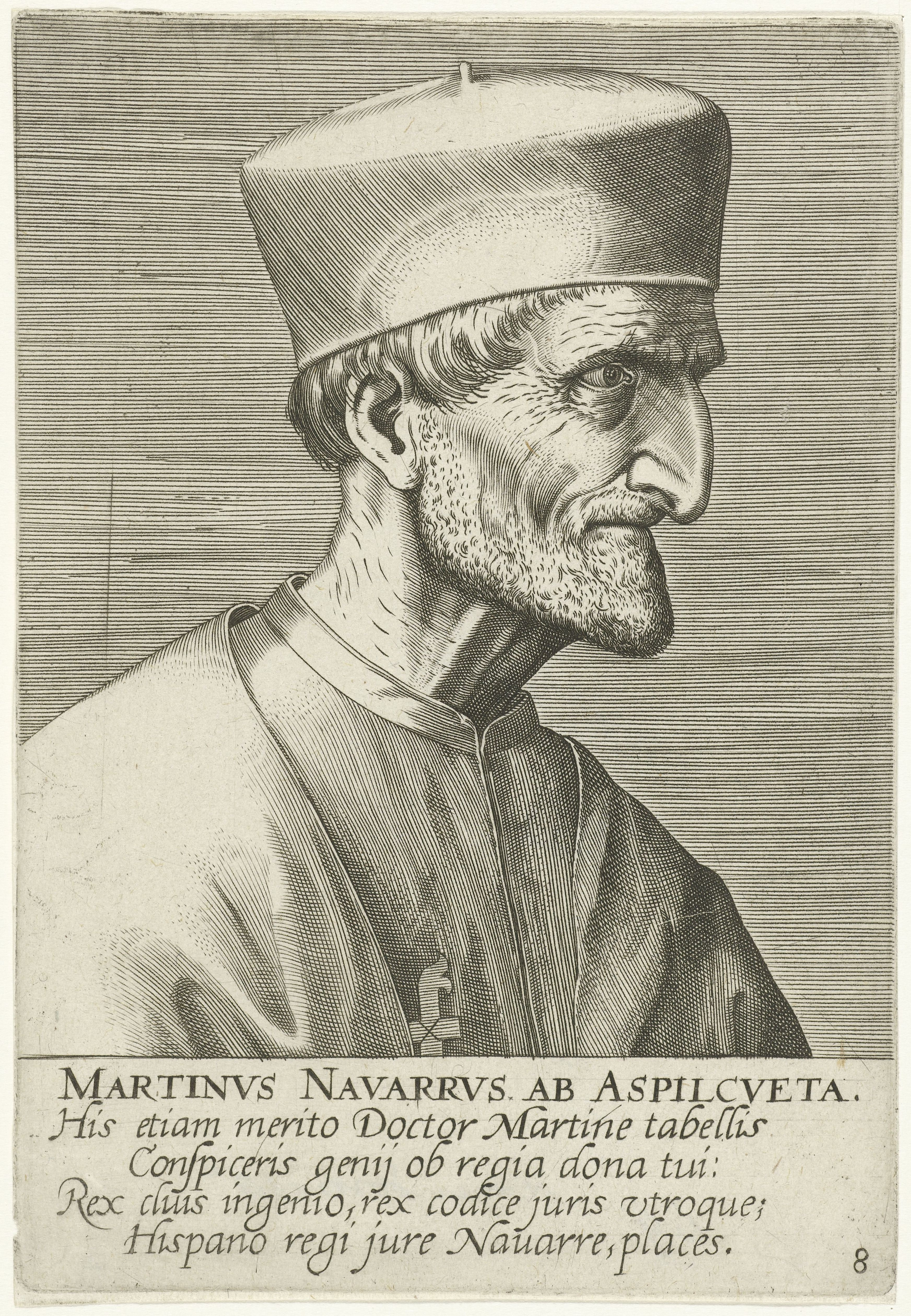
- Martín de Azpilcueta
- Born: 13 December 1492; Barásoain, Kingdom of Navarre
- Died: 1 June 1586; Rome, Papal States

Philosophical work
- Era: Renaissance philosophy
- Region: Western philosophy; Spanish philosophy
- School: Thomism; School of Salamanca
- Main interests: Canon law; Economics; Ethics; Theology
- Notable ideas: Quantity theory of money

Martín de Azpilcueta (Azpilkueta in Basque) (13 December 1492 – 1 June 1586), or Doctor Navarrus, was a Navarrese canonist, theologian and economist.

Renowned in his time, he was the first to formulate the quantity theory of money in 1556 and was with Francisco de Vitoria and Domingo de Soto one of the main thinkers of the School of Salamanca in relation to law and economics.

== Life ==
Born in Barásoain in a noble family of Navarre, Martín de Azpilcueta was a relative of Francis Xavier. In 1508, he was amongst the rare students accepted in the new Colegio Mayor de San Ildefonso, founded by the cardinal Cisneros.

After his obtention of degrees in philosophy and theology at Alcalá, then for political reasons he fled to France in 1516 to study at the university of Toulouse and obtained a degree of doctor in civil and canon law in 1518.

Beginning in 1524, Azpilcueta served in several canon law chairs at the University of Salamanca. He got the chair of Decretum in 1532 and then obtained the first chair of canon law in 1537, when he taught to Diego de Covarrubias and Arias Piñel.

At the invitation of Charles V of Spain and John III of Portugal, he taught at Coimbra University in Portugal from 1538 to 1555. There he became friendly with Henry, future king of Portugal.

Back to Spain in 1555, he was charged by Philip II of Spain to defend his friend Bartolomé Carranza, Archbishop of Toledo, accused before the Tribunal of the Inquisition. At the age of eighty, he went to Rome to followed the process. Though he failed to exculpate the Archbishop, Azpilcueta was highly honoured at Rome by several popes, and was looked on as an oracle of learning and prudence. His humility, disinterestedness, and charity were proverbial. Pope Pius V made him counsellor of the Apostolic Penitentiary and tried, without success, to make him a cardinal.

Azpilcueta died in Rome at the age of 94. He is buried in the national Church of San Antonio de' Portoghesi. Among other lives of Azpilcueta is one by his nephew that is prefixed to the Roman edition of his works.

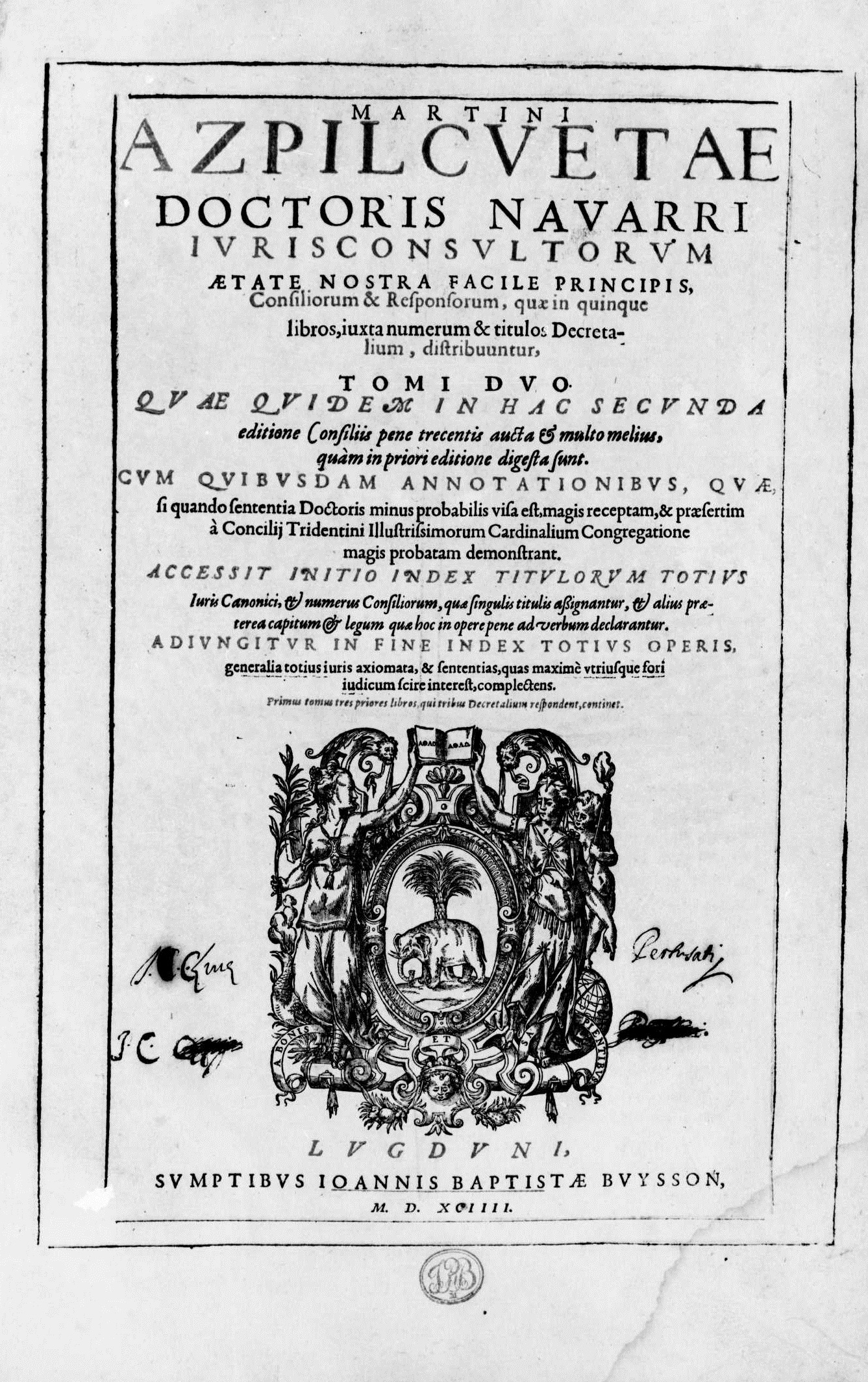
Consilia et responsa, 1594

== Works ==
=== Economy ===
In his work, Azpilcueta argued that the use of "money in exchanges is not unnatural," as Aristotle had claimed, and "put money on the same level as any other merchandise, and, consequently, established that the morality of exchanges did not depend on money as their object but on an equitable exchange". Then, he legitimated the practice of interest against the Catholic prohibition of usury.

Congitating about the effects of gold and silver arrivals from the Spanish Empire, Azpilcueta independently formulated the quantity theory of money in 1556. He also allegedly invented the mathematical concept of the time value of money.

In his work on the revenues of benefices, which was dedicated to Philip II of Spain and Pope Pius V, he maintained that beneficed clergymen were free to expend the fruits of their benefices only for their own necessary support and that of the poor.

=== Law ===
His Manual de confesores y penitentes (1549), originally written in Spanish, was enormously influential in the fields of canon law and ethics, and by the first quarter of the seventeenth century, it had gone through 81 editions. The Manual made an important step in the development of moral theology as its own discipline. One of the four appendices Azpilcueta wrote for the Manual, addressing exchange, supply and demand, and money, has recently been translated into English and published as On Exchange (2014).

He formulated a basic form of the principle of contractual consensualim, which was later elaborated upon by other members of the School of Salamanca like Leonardus Lessius and Pedro de Oñate.

Azpilcueta cogitated also on the concepts of commutative justice, just price and fairness in exchange: with a large interpretation of the principe of laesio and of the seventh Commandment, he considered that contracts doesn't be burdens for a party and that any violation of the equity can be take to ecclesiastical courts.

=== Use of vernacular languages ===
In the face of use by the reformed Church of natural languages in their liturgy and divulgation, the Counter-Reformation reacted by hanging onto Latin. On the other hand, Azpilcueta supported the use of vernacular languages in his 1545 Commento en Romance released in Coimbra, wrote down the prayers Our Father, Hail Mary, and Creed in both Latin and Romance, (Castilian) and encountered the opposition of the defenders of the Latin tradition.

Later, he had to explain in his 1586 Miscellaneum centum that vernacular languages had been used before, as approved by bishops and inquisitors. He cited "a pious and knowledgeable Cantabrian" in reference to Sancho de Elso from Estella, who had used Basque in different prayers. He explained the unfamiliarity of "the rustic dwellers and highlanders" with the Christian teachings as to be partly because of the use of Latin, "instead of their native language, learning them by heart".

== Publications ==
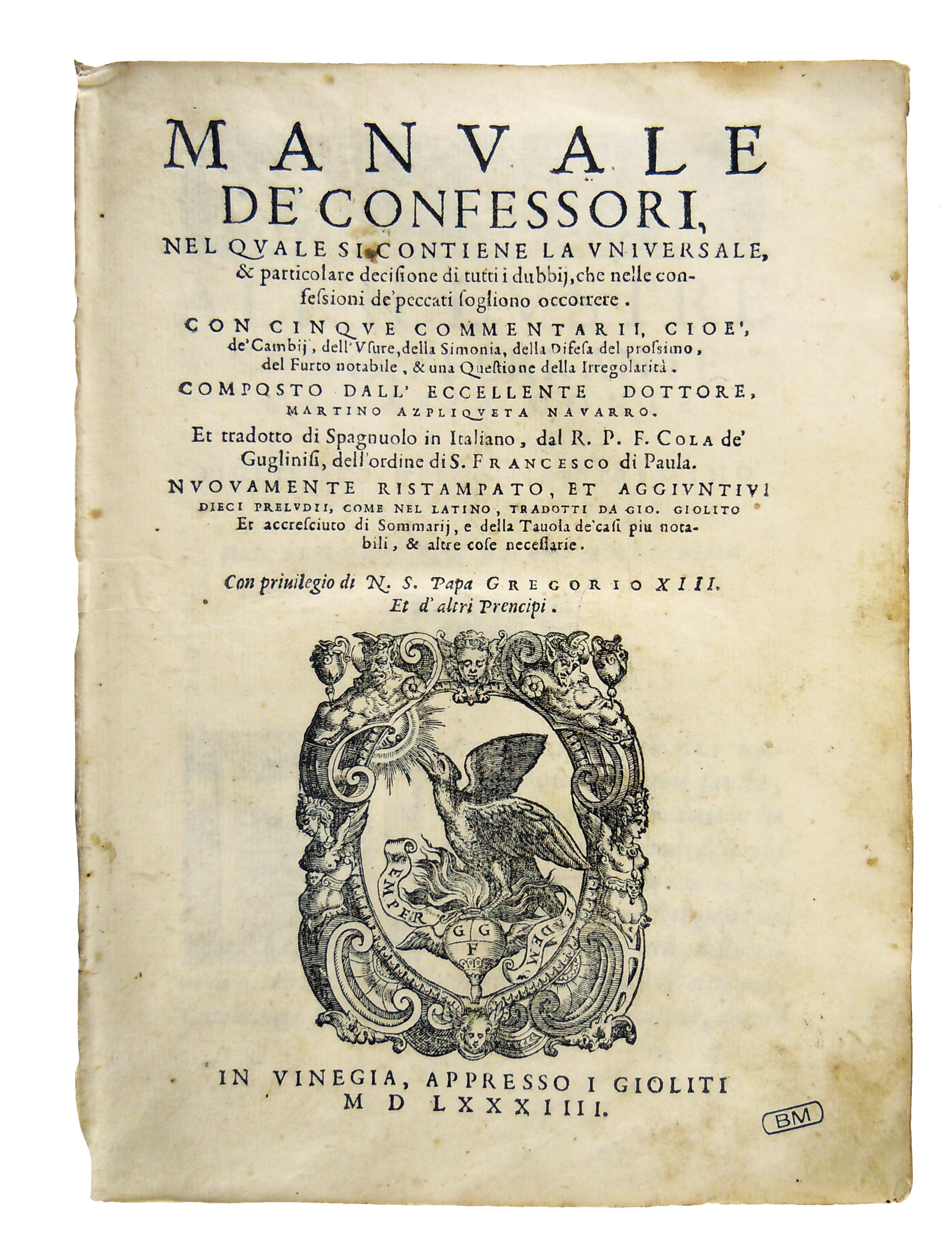
Manuale de' confessori, 1584 (Milano, Fondazione Mansutti).

- Comentarii de Poenitentia, Coímbra, 1542.
- Si quando de Rescriptis in causa propria. Coímbra, 1543.
- Comentario [...] sobre el capítulo Inter Verba, Coímbra, 1543.
- Relectio sive iterata praelectio [...] de resit. Spoliat, Coímbra, 1547.
- Relectio in cap. Novit [...] de iudicis, Coímbra, 1548.
- Commento o repetición del capítulo Quando de consecratione, Coímbra, 1550.
- Relectio cap. ita quorundam de Iudaeis, Coímbra, 1550.
- Relectio in Levitico, Coímbra, 1550.
- Manual de confesores y penitentes o Enchirindion confessariorum, édition portugaise, Coímbra, 1550; édition en castillan, Salamanque, 1556; Pampelune, Adrián de Amberes, 1566;
- Cinco comentarios, Salamanque, 1556.
- Comentario resolutorio de usuras, Salamanque, 1556. Pampelune, Adrián de Amberes, 1565.
- Repertorio sobre hurtos, Salamanque, 1556.
- Tratado sobre las rentas de los beneficios eclesiásticos, Valladolid, 1566.
- Adiciones al Manual de confesores, 1569.
- Commentarii in tres De Poenitentia, 1569.
- Capítulo veyte y ocho de las adiciones del Manual de confesores, Valladolid, 1570.
- Respuesta [...] a De redditibus ecclesiasticis, 1571.
- Commentarius de spoliis clericorum, Rome, 1572.
- Tratado de alabanza y murmuración, Valladolid, 1572.
- Commentarius [...] de religiones sine debito, Rome, 1574.
- Comentarius de silentio in divinis Officciis, 1580.
- Miscellanea centum de oratione, praesertim de Psalterio et Rosario. Rome, 1586.
- Discurso del silencio que se deue guardar en los Diuinos Oficios, principalmente en el Coro, Salamanque, Pedro Lasso, 1588.
- Commentaria [...] Gregorii IX, ca. 1595.
- Consiliorum sive Responsorum Rome, 1602.
- Enajenación de las Cosas Eclesiásticas.
- Comentario sobre los expolios de los clérigos.
- Cuatro Comentarios de Regulares.
- Capitulo Humanae Aures.
- Tractatus de Finibus Humanorum Actuum.
- Tratado de Penitencia.
- Tratado de Indulgencias y Jubileo.

== See also ==
- Doctrine of mental reservation
- Equivocation
- Tomás de Mercado, another "Iberian monetarist"
- Pedro Agerre Azpilikueta, Basque prominent writer and maternal relative

== Sources ==
- Decock, Wim (2013). Theologians and Contract Law : The Moral Transformation of the Ius commune (ca. 1500-1650). Leiden/Boston: Martinus Nijhoff Publishers. p. 723. ISBN 978-90-04-23285-3.
- Decock, Wim (2018). "Martin de Azpilcueta". In R. Domingo; J. Martínez-Torrón (eds.). Great Christian Jurists in Spanish History. Law and Christianity. Cambridge: Cambridge University Press. pp. 116–133. ISBN 978-1-108-44873-4.
- Giraud, Bibli. Sacr., II 334-336 (gives list of his writings)
- Hugo von Hurter, Nomenclator, (1892), I, 124-127
- Azurmendi, Joxe (2015): "Nafarroatik Nafarroara" in Pruden Gartzia: Nafarroako auziaz, Donostia: Elkar. ISBN 978-84-9027-443-9

Attribution
