= Juan de Mariana =

Spanish historian (1536–1624)

Juan de Mariana SJ
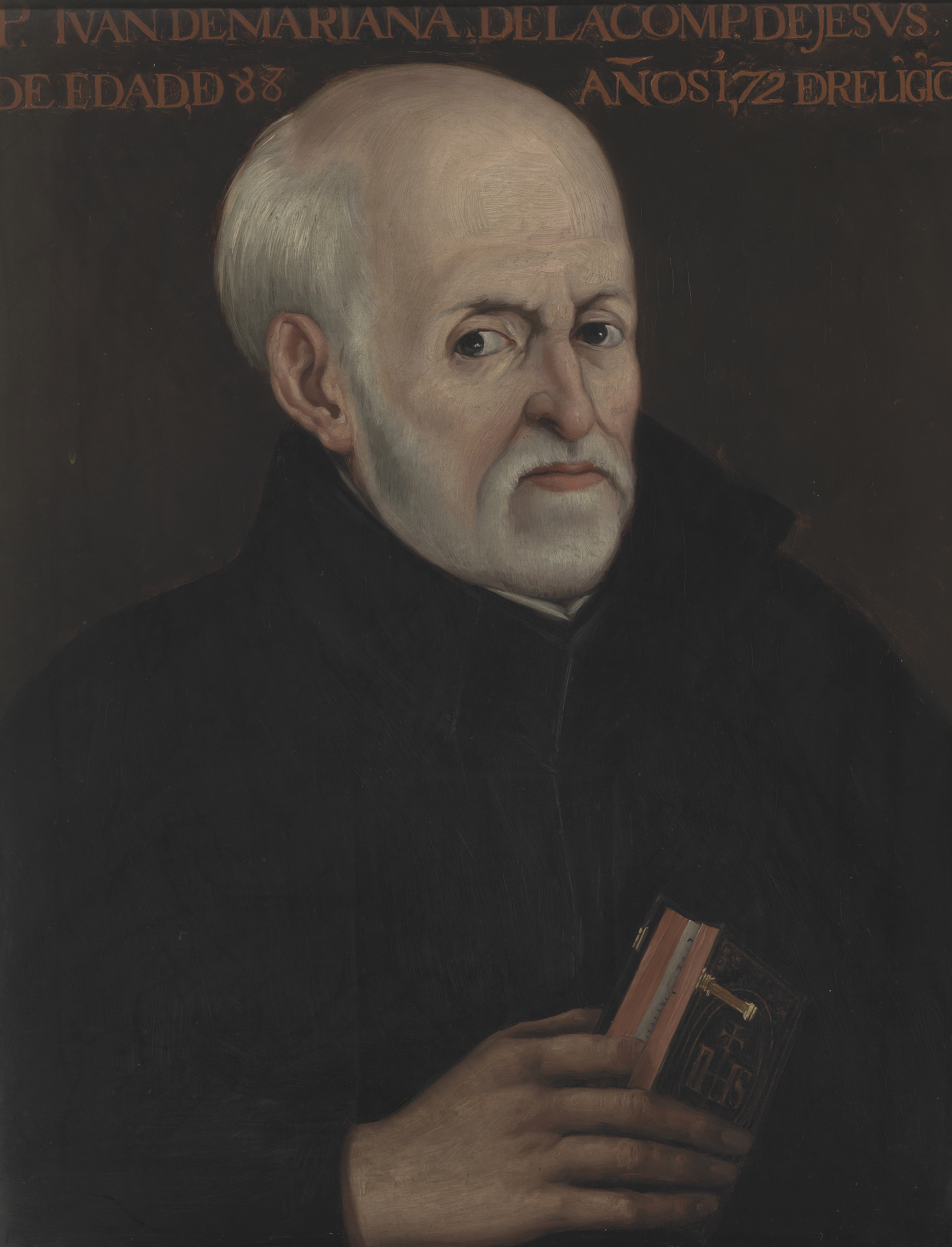
- Juan de Mariana (Museo del Prado)
- Born: 2 April 1536; Talavera de la Reina, Crown of Castile
- Died: February 17, 1624 (aged 87); Toledo, Crown of Castile

Philosophical work
- Era: Early modern philosophy
- Region: Western philosophy; Spanish philosophy
- School: Scholasticism; School of Salamanca
- Main interests: Political philosophy; ethics; economics; history
- Notable ideas: Tyrannicide under certain conditions; criticism of currency debasement

Juan de Mariana SJ (2 April 1536 – 17 February 1624) was a Spanish Jesuit priest, Scholastic, historian, and member of the Monarchomachs. Mariana was a member of the School of Salamanca.

== Life ==
Juan de Mariana was born in Talavera, Kingdom of Toledo. He studied at the Complutense University of Alcalá de Henares and was admitted at the age of 17 into the Society of Jesus.

In 1561, he began teaching theology in Rome. Among his pupils were Robert Bellarmine, who became a cardinal. He traveled to Sicily. In 1569 he was sent to Paris, where his expositions of the writings of Thomas Aquinas attracted large audiences. In 1574, owing to ill health, he obtained permission to return to Spain; the rest of his life passed at the Jesuits' house in Toledo in vigorous literary activity. He died in Madrid.

== Works ==
Juan de Mariana's great work, Historiae de rebus Hispaniae, first appeared in twenty books at Toledo in 1592; ten books were subsequently added (1605), extending the work to the accession of Charles V in 1519. In a still later abstract the author covered the accession of Philip IV in 1621. It was so well received that Mariana was induced to translate it into Castilian (the first part in 1601; completed, 1609; English translation by J. Stevens, 1699).

Mariana's Historiae, though in many parts uncritical, is regarded for its research, accuracy, sagacity and style. Of his other works the most interesting is the treatise De rege et regis institutione (On the king and the royal institution, Toledo, 1598). In its sixth chapter, the question whether it is lawful to overthrow a tyrant is freely discussed and answered in the affirmative, a circumstance which brought much odium upon the Jesuits, especially after the assassination of Henry IV of France, in 1610. A volume entitled Tractatus VII. theologici et historici (published by Mariana in Cologne in 1609, containing in particular a tract, De morte et immortalitate, and another, De monetae mutatione (On the Alteration of Money), where Mariana criticized the royal monetary politic, was put upon the Index Expurgatorius. This led to the confinement of its author by the Inquisition and to a process of lèse-majesté. Allegedly, either the De rege et regis institutione or the De monetae mutatione influenced Chapter 29 of Part One of Cervantes's Don Quijote. During his confinement, his papers were discovered to include criticism of the Jesuits. This was published after his death as Discursus de erroribus qui in forma gubernationis societatis Jesu occurrunt (A discourse on the sickness of the Jesuit order, Bordeaux, 1625), and was reprinted by order of Charles III when he banished the Jesuits from Spain.

According to Marjorie Grice-Hutchinson, an academic economist specializing in the School of Salamanca, Juan de Mariana and other Spanish scholastics provided much of the theoretical basis for Austrian School economic thought.

=== English translations ===
- "A Treatise on the Alteration of Money", Journal of Markets and Morality, Vol. V, No. 2, Fall 2002.
- "On the Coinage", Quarterly Journal of Austrian Economics, Vol. XXI, No. 2, Summer 2018.

== See also ==
- Gabriel Biel
- Francisco Suárez

== Bibliography ==
- Braun, Harald Ernst. Juan De Mariana And Early Modern Spanish Political Thought, Ashgate Publishing, Ltd., 2007.
- Cirot, Georges. Etudes sur les Historiographes Espagnols; Mariana, Historien, Bordeaux: Feret & Fils, 1904.
- Fernandez, Angel. "Property and Subjective Rights in Juan de Mariana," MPRA Paper, No. 25932, October 2010.
- Graf, Eric Clifford. "Sancho Panza's 'por negros que sean, los he de volver blancos o amarillos' (DQ 1.29) and Juan de Mariana's De moneta of 1605." Cervantes: Bulletin of the Cervantes Society of America 31.2 (2011): 23–51.
- Grice-Hutchinson, Marjorie. The School of Salamanca: Readings in Spanish Monetary Theory, 1544 1605, Oxford: Clarendon Press, 1952.
- Laures, John. The Political Economy of Juan de Mariana, Fordham University Press, 1928.
- Lewy, Guenter. Constitutionalism and Statecraft during the Golden Age of Spain: A Study of the Political Philosophy of Juan de Mariana, S.J., E. Droz, 1960.
- Renaud Malavialle (dir.), De l’éducation du prince à la critique du pouvoir : le jésuite Juan de Mariana (1536–1624) ou l’art de la composition, dossier monographique publié dans e-Spania, revue interdisciplinaire d'études hispaniques médiévales et modernes, n°31, octobre 2018.
- Renaud Malavialle, « Éducation du prince et pensée politique chez le jésuite Juan Mariana (1536–1624). La familiarité au risque de l’intimité d’après le De rege et regis institutione (1599) », e-Spania [En ligne], 37 | octobre 2020. Éducation du prince et pensée politique chez le jésuite Juan Mariana (1536–1624). La familiarité au risque de l’intimité d’après le De rege et regis institutione (1599); doi:10.4000/e-spania.36751
- Moss, Laurence, and Christopher Ryan, eds. Economic Thought in Spain. Cheltenham, UK: Edward Elgar, 1993.
- Ranke, L. von, Zur Kritik neuerer Geschichtsschreibung, Leipzig, 1874.
- Rothbard, Murray. Economic Thought before Adam Smith, Edward Elgar Publishing Ltd., 1995.
- Smith, Gerard (ed). Jesuit Thinkers of the Renaissance, Marquette University Press, 1939, pp. 157–192.
- Soons, Alan. Juan de Mariana, Twayne Pub., 1982.
