= Tomás de Mercado =

Spanish Dominican friar (1525–1575)

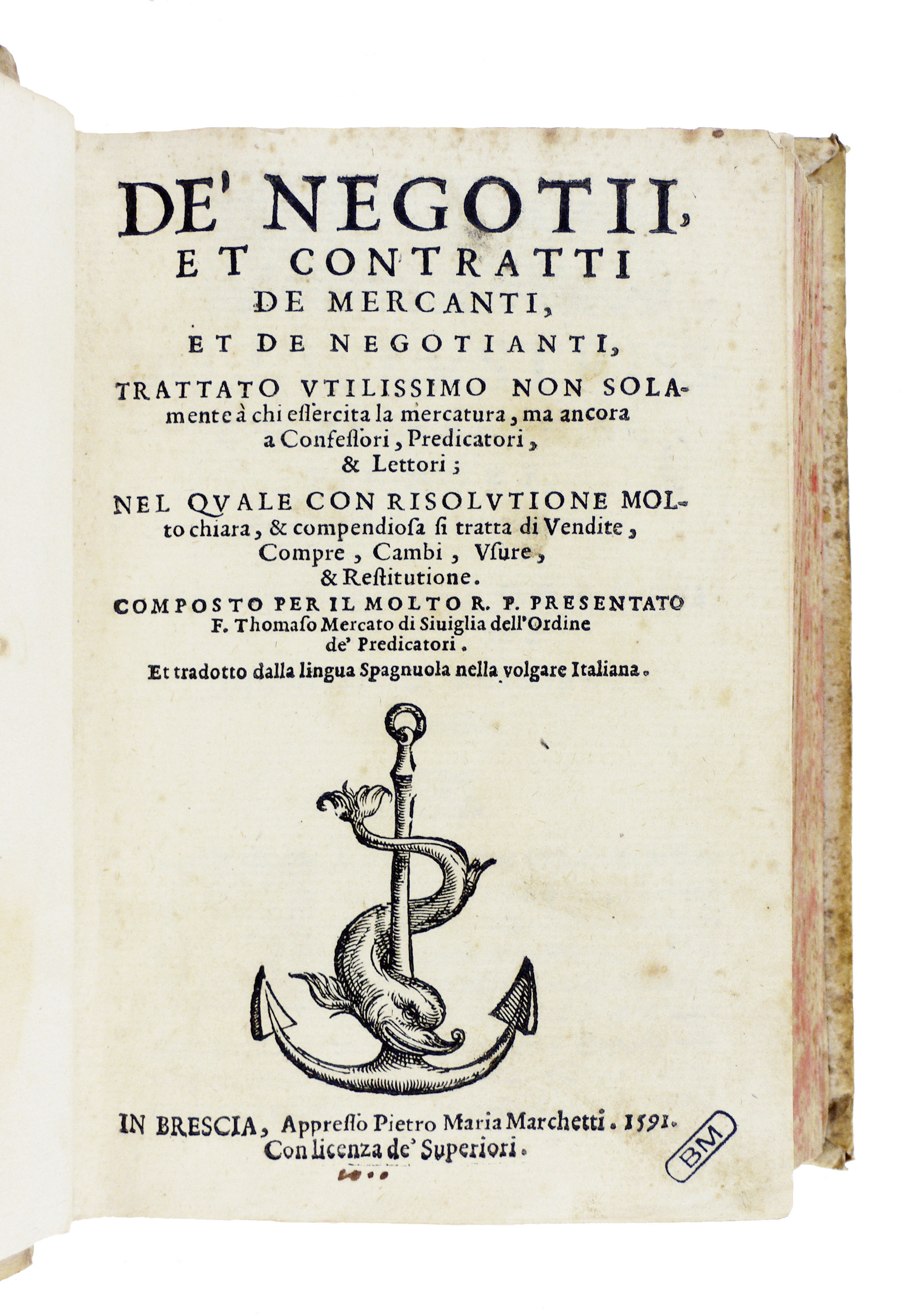
De' negotii et contratti de mercanti, 1591.

Tomás de Mercado (1525–1575) was a Spanish Dominican friar and both an economist and a theologian, best known for his book Summa de Tratos y Contratos ("Manual of Deals and Contracts") of 1571. Together with Martín de Azpilcueta he founded the economic tradition of "Iberian monetarism"; both form part of the general intellectual tradition often known as "Late Scholasticism", or the School of Salamanca.

He was either born in Seville or possibly Mexico, where he joined the Dominicans as a young man, becoming lecturer in Arts in the Priory in Mexico City, before returning to study at Salamanca University, where he then became a lecturer in philosophy, moral theology and law. He then worked in the Exchange House of Seville, the centre of Spain's international money-flows. He died at sea on a voyage returning to Mexico.

Mercado became more widely known outside the Spanish-speaking world after he was discussed by Joseph Schumpeter in his History of Economic Analysis, published posthumously, ed. Elisabeth Boody Schumpeter, in 1954. With the strong revival of monetarist economics since then, he has attracted further scholarly attention.

== Mercado's Summa ==
The Summa was an expanded edition of a work first published in 1569 as De los tratos de India y tratantes en ellas, redacted at Sevillian merchants' request. It was written for businessmen as well as scholars and contains many general digressions on social issues, often in very lively language.

He devotes much thought to the concept of the fair or "just price", analysing it in terms of wheat, and strongly supporting the fixed price set by the government (tasa del trigo) on social and ethical grounds, even if it meant producers selling at a loss. He considered thus that the prices control politic of the Spanish authorities were a divine obligation made to the prince, in charge of tranquillity and peace of the kingdom. Consequently, Mercado is a vigorous supporter of the intervention of the State in the economy, in the contrary of Luis de Molina or Leonardus Lessius, who considered that any intervention of the authorities is inopportune owing to the corruption and the clientelism that it will create.

Mercado devoted a chapter to the African slave trade, of which he was highly critical, seeing clearly that the concept of "just enslavement" did not reflect the practice of the actual trade. However he regarded it as acceptable for Europeans to buy slaves enslaved by Africans, and accepted the enslavement of captives in war, those sentenced for crimes, or children sold by their parents from necessity.
