= Azpilicueta =

Azpilicueta is a Basque surname. Notable people with this surname include the following:

- César Azpilicueta (born 1989), Spanish footballer
- Francis Xavier (1506–1552), born Francisco de Jasso y Azpilicueta, Roman Catholic missionary
- Martín de Azpilcueta (1492–1586), Navarrese-French canonist, theologian and economist
