= Fernando Vázquez de Menchaca =

Spanish jurist (1512–1569)

Fernando Vázquez de Menchaca (1512–1569) was a Spanish jurist.

Fernando Vázquez de Menchaca was probably born in 1512 in Valladolid. His family members included judges and administrators. He studied law at the universities of Vallodolid and Salamanca, graduating from the latter about 1548. Menchaca held various positions as a judge and bureaucrat, including at the court of Philip II of Spain. Menchaca was a member of the Council of the Indies and the Order of Santiago. He died in 1569 in Seville. He was a hidalgo.

In his treatise Controversiarum illustrium aliarumque usu frequentium libri tres (Three books of famous and other controversies frequently occurring in practice), likely first published in Venice in 1564, Menchaca argued that political authority derives from the consent of the governed. Because people form societies by "natural inclination", according to Menchaca, political authority is an aspect of natural law. Menchaca held that persons have natural rights including liberty and equality and endorsed a version of the social contract theory. In this respect, Menchaca thought that domestic society and international society were on a par: both were based on "pacts and treaties". Further, since people create society "for their own utility", Menchaca argued that the people had an inalienable power to control their rulers.

Mencha is considered a member of the School of Salamanca. He published six treatises between 1559 and 1564. His thought influenced Hugo Grotius and Samuel von Pufendorf. Scholar Salvador Rus Rufino identifies Menchaca as part of the tradition of Catholic humanism.

== Sources ==
- Rufino, Salvador Rus (10 May 2018). "Fernando Vázquez de Menchaca". In Domingo, Rafael; Martínez-Torrón, Javier (eds.). Great Christian Jurists in Spanish History. Cambridge University Press. pp. 157–173. doi:10.1017/9781108624732.009. ISBN 978-1-108-62473-2.
