= School of Salamanca =

Spanish Scholastic intellectual movement

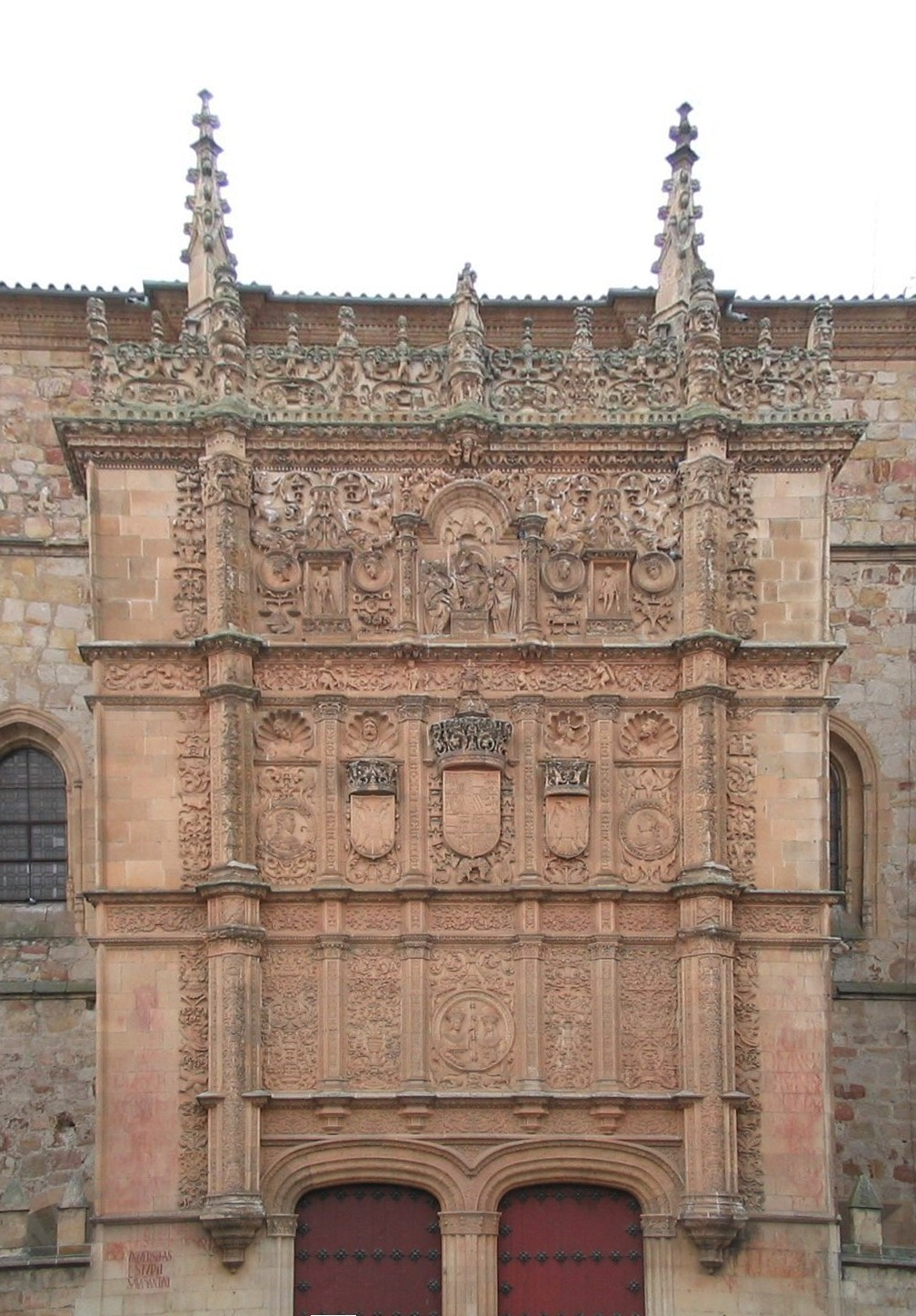
University of Salamanca

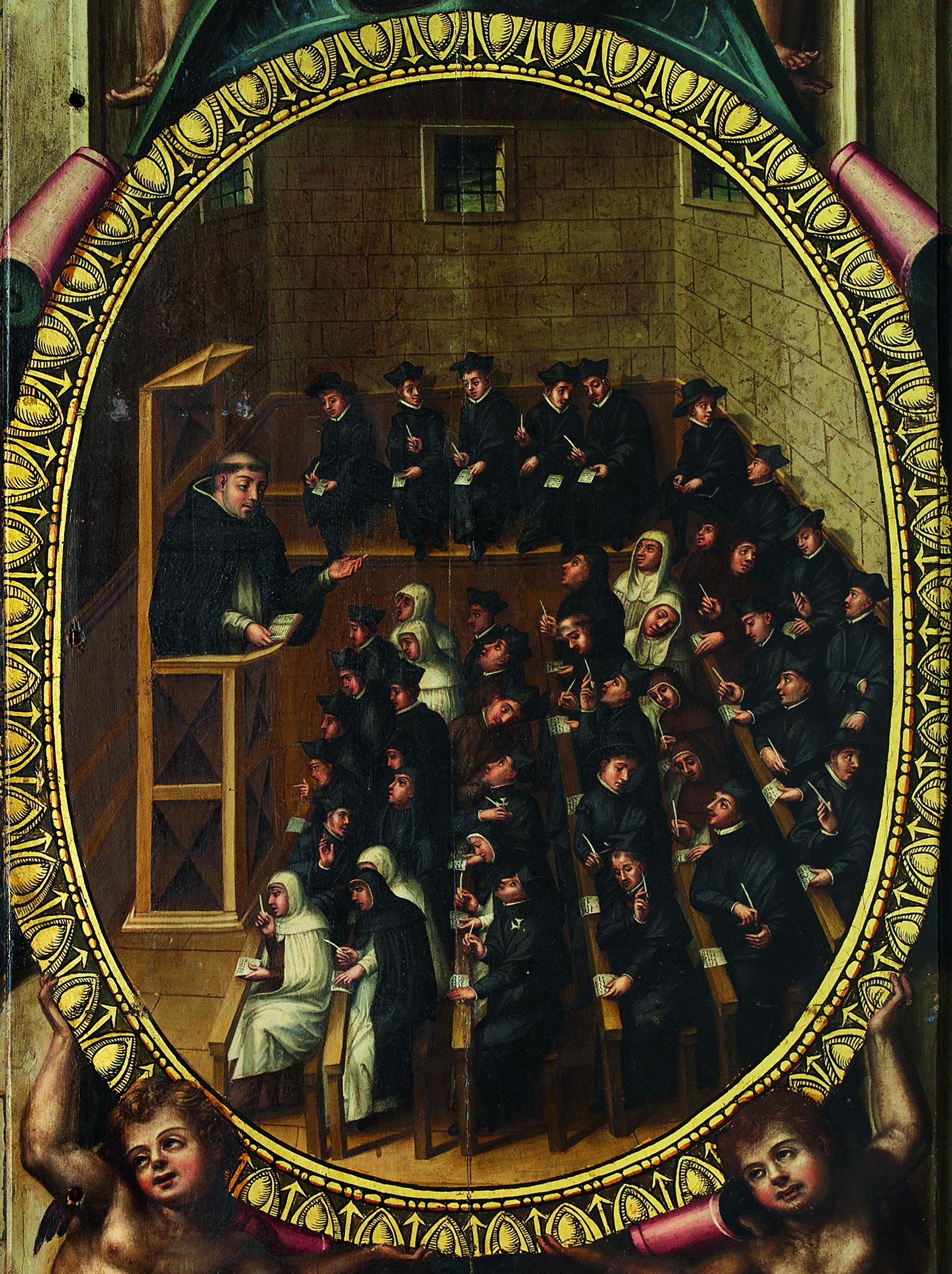
17th-century classroom at the University of Salamanca

The School of Salamanca (Spanish: Escuela de Salamanca) was an intellectual movement of 16th- and 17th-century Spanish Scholastic theologians rooted in the intellectual and pedagogical work of Francisco de Vitoria. From the beginning of the 16th century, the traditional Catholic conception of man and of his relation to God and to the world had been informed by internal developments in the Italian Renaissance and its humanism, but also been challenged by the Protestant Reformation and the new geographical discoveries and their consequences. These new problems were addressed by the School of Salamanca.

The name is derived from the University of Salamanca (Spain), where de Vitoria and other members of the school were based. The Salamanca School of economic thought is frequently regarded as an early precursor to the Austrian School of Economics. This is due to its development of the subjective theory of value, its advocacy for free-market principles, and its focus on the supply and demand of money—ideas that would eventually contribute to the modern concept of sound money.

== Scope of the term ==
Most properly, the term applies merely to the intellectual movement of the early 16th century at the university of Salamanca led by Francisco de Vitoria. The University of Salamanca (Spain) was founded in 1218 and was one of the homes of Thomisitic theology. More broadly, it comprises the bulk of Iberian Renaissance-Scholastic philosophy. In its broadest application, the notion is sometimes applied to the entirety of Second scholasticism, of which Vitoria's career and legacy are but an early, albeit formative part. This, however, is highly misleading, as there are important strands of Second scholasticism, such as the Baroque Scotism, of which connexion to the Salamancan legacy is rather tenuous.

The term most often connotes developments specifically in the fields of philosophy of law and economics associated with Vitoria's legacy; for Scholastic philosophy and theology of the 16th century in general the term "Renaissance Scholasticism" is now preferred by scholars.

== History and leading figures ==
The School of Salamanca originated at the University of Salamanca in 1526 when Francisco de Vitoria, a Dominican who studied in Paris during a Thomist revival, was elected to the Prime chair of Theology. Vitoria held it till his death in 1546. Going against the pre-established university statutes, he installed Thomas Aquinas' Summa Theologiae as the primary textbook of instruction and directed the methods of scholasticism towards the various problems raised by the Spanish conquest of the Americas, the growth of long distance commerce, and the Protestant Reformation.

The early phase of the school was dominated by Dominican Thomists. Vitoria and his philosophical successors, most notabily Domingo de Soto and Melchor Cano, helped transform Salamanca into a revival of Scholasticism. Soto was appointed to the second chair of theology in 1532, later held the Prime chair, and served as confessor for Charles V, and was a participant in the Council of Trent.

The line was continued by the Carmelites Complutenses and Salmanticenses.

In the latter part of the 16th century, the newly founded Society of Jesus, commonly known as the Jesuits rose to intellectual prominence. Authors associated with the movement or its offshoots include the Conimbricenses, Pedro da Fonseca (1528–1599), Luis de Molina (1535–1600), Gabriel Vásquez (died 1604) and Francisco Suárez (1548–1617). Generally speaking, the Jesuits felt less bound than the Dominicans to Thomism, which allowed Molina and Suárez a greater degree of originality. Consequently, some modern scholars distinguish a Dominican School of Salamanca from the later Jesuit School of Coimbra, while still considering both to be parts of the Spanish Scholasticism.

After the death of Suárez in 1617, the School of Salamanca and its descendents lost their innovative qualities and turned into recapitulation. The Discalced Carmelites produced a sizable compilation of past thought in the Cursus Theologiae Moralis, with the publication of its third volume in 1670 often considered as the end of the School of Salamanca.

There is scholarly debate on which thinkers are properly assigned to the School, or whether it is even proper to speak of a single "school" in a strict sense. The narrower sense of the term refers to the two or three generations of pupils of Francisco de Vitoria, the founder of the school, whereas in a broader sense it is indistinguishable from the Spanish Scholasticism of the period.

== Law ==
=== Philosophy of law ===
Many leading figures of the school, such as Francisco de Vitoria, Domingo de Soto, Martín de Azpilcueta (or Azpilicueta), Tomás de Mercado, or Francisco Suárez, were not just philosophers and theologians but also jurists and scholars of natural law and of morality. They undertook the adaptation of the teachings of Thomas Aquinas to the then-new political-economic order.

The juridical doctrine of the School of Salamanca represented a profound transformation of medieval concepts of law, with a revindication of liberty not habitual in Europe of that time.

The natural rights of man came to be, in one form or another, the center of attention, including rights as a corporeal being (right to life, economic rights such as the right to own property) and spiritual rights (the right to freedom of thought and to human dignity).

=== Natural law ===
The members of the School of Salamanca were the first people to develop a modern approach of natural law.

For Domingo de Soto, the theologian's task is to assess the moral foundations of civil law. That's how he criticized the new Spanish charities' laws on the pretext that they violated the fundamental rights of the poor, or that Juan de Mariana considered that the consent of population was needed in matter of taxation or money alteration. In fact, Soto published his famous treatise De iustitia et iure (1553–1556), a work built on predominantly philosophical and natural-law foundations rather than strictly theological ones, as Jaime Mercant Simó argues in his doctoral thesis.

Except for the earlier Laws of Burgos, the views of the Salamanca school constituted a quasi-novelty in European thought and went counter to those then predominant in Spain, and Europe that people indigenous to the Americas had no such rights.

=== Sovereignty ===
The School of Salamanca distinguished two realms of power, the natural or civil realm and the realm of the supernatural, which were often conflated in the Middle Ages through granting royal control of investiture of bishops, or the temporal powers of the pope.

One direct consequence of the separation of realms of power is that the king or emperor does not legitimately have jurisdiction over souls, nor does the pope have legitimate temporal power. This included the idea that there are limits on the legitimate powers of government.

Thus, according to Luis de Molina a nation is analogous to the mercantile corporations of his time, in that those who govern are holders of power (effectively sovereigns) but a collective power, to which they are subject, derives from them jointly.

Nonetheless, in de Molina's view, the power of society over the individual is greater than that of a mercantile corporation over its members, because the power of the government of a nation emanates from God's divine power (as against merely from the power of individuals sovereign over themselves in their business dealings).

At this time, the monarchy of England was extending the theory of the divine right of kings—under which the monarch is the unique legatee of God's power—asserting that subjects must follow the monarch's orders, in order not to contravene God's design. Counter to this, several adherents of the School sustained that the people are the vehicle of divine sovereignty, which they, in turn, pass to a prince under various conditions. In this, the late scholastics were instrumental in the development of early modern theories of political representation.

Possibly the one who went furthest in this direction was Francisco Suárez, whose work Defensio Fidei Catholicae adversus Anglicanae sectae errores (The Defense of the Catholic Faith against the errors of the Anglican sect 1613) was the strongest contemporary defense of popular sovereignty. Men are born free by their nature and not as slaves of another man, and can disobey even to the point of deposing an unjust government.

As with de Molina, he affirms that political power does not reside in any individual, but he differs subtly in that he considers that the recipient of that power is the people as a whole, not a collection of sovereign individuals—in the same way, Jean-Jacques Rousseau's theory of popular sovereignty would consider the people as a collective group superior to the sum that composes it.

Gabriel Vásquez (1549–1604) held that natural law is not limited to the individual, but obliges societies to respect natural rights and justice.

For Suárez, the political power of society is contractual in origin because the community forms by consensus of free wills. The consequence of this contractualist theory is that the natural form of government is either a democracy or a republic, while oligarchy or monarchy arise as secondary institutions, whose claim to justice is based on consent of the governed organized in a political body.

=== Law of peoples and international law ===
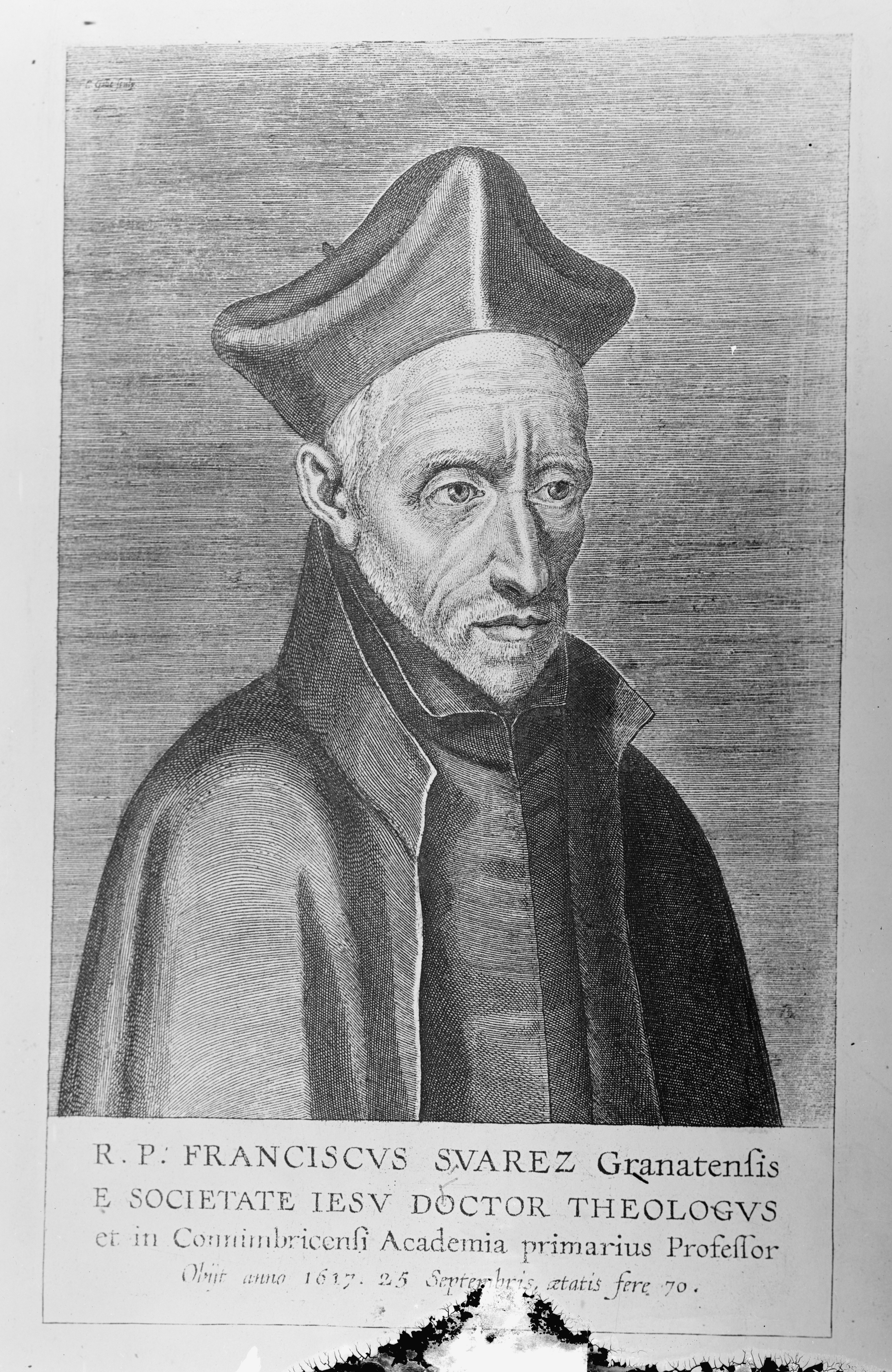
Francisco Suárez

Francisco de Vitoria played an important role in the early modern comprehension of ius gentium (the rights of nations). He extrapolated his ideas of legitimate sovereign power to relations between nations, concluding that international society as well ought to be ruled by just forms respecting the rights of all. The common good of the world is of a category superior to the good of each state. This meant that relations between states ought to pass from being justified by force to being justified by law and right. Vitoria has been referred to, along with Grotius, as the “father of international law.”

Francisco Suárez subdivided the concept of ius gentium. Working with already well-formed categories, he carefully distinguished ius inter gentes from ius intra gentes. Ius inter gentes (which corresponds to modern international law) was a just agreement among the majority of countries, although being positive law, not natural law, it was not necessarily universal. On the other hand, ius intra gentes, or civil law, is specific to each nation.

Many scholars have argued for the importance of Vitoria and Suárez as the forerunners and founders of the international law field, and the precursors of the seminal text De iure belli ac pacis by Grotius. Others, such as Koskenniemi, have argued that none of these humanist and scholastic thinkers can be understood to have founded international law in the modern sense, instead placing its origins in the post-1870 period.

=== Just war ===
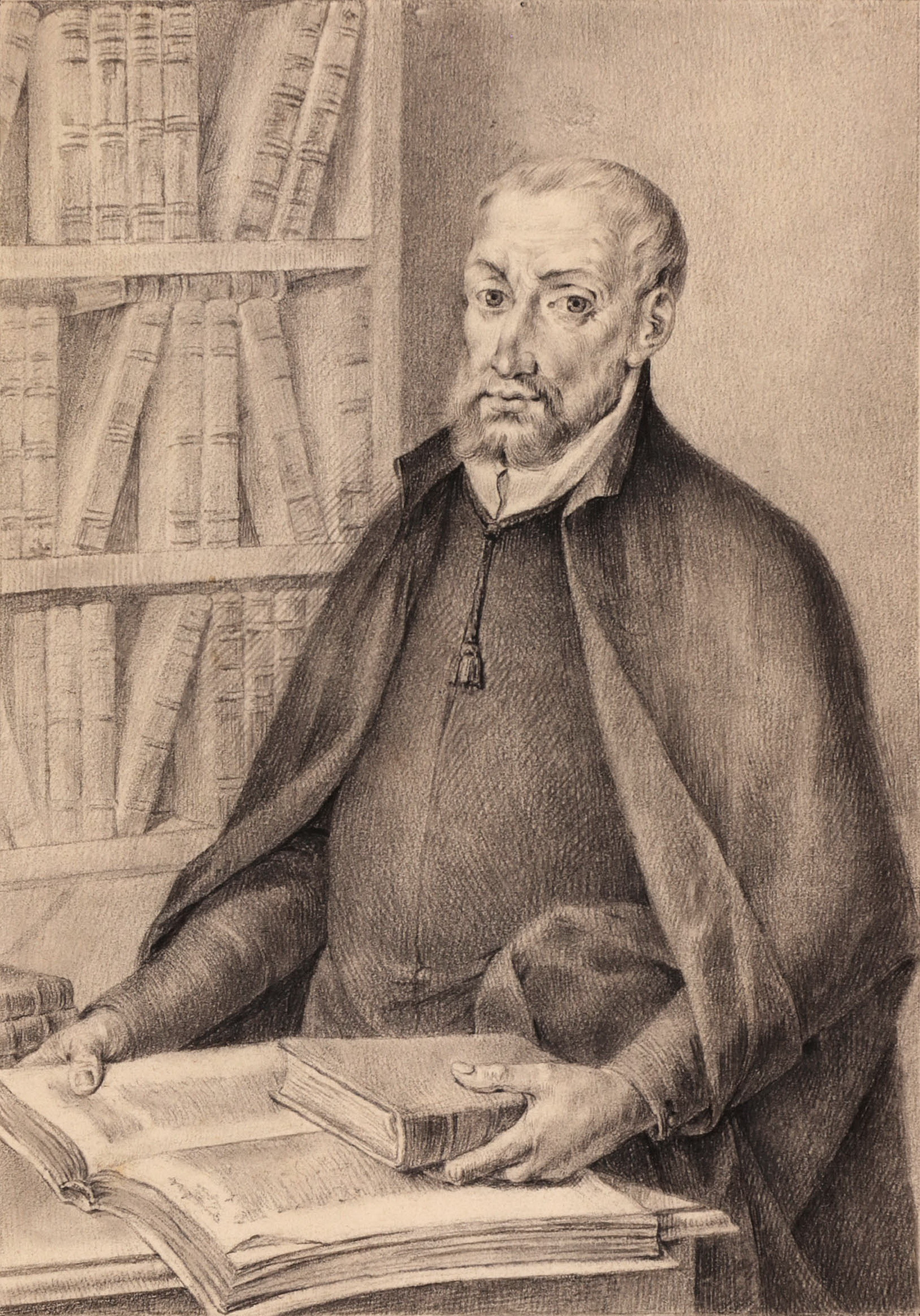
Juan Ginés de Sepúlveda

The School of Salamanca made significant contributions to just war theory, particularly in the writings of Francisco de Vitoria, Francisco Suárez and Luis de Molina. Building on Thomas Aquinas and Augustine of Hippo, these scholars developed further the ethics of warfare.

Vitoria argued in his lecture De Indis that a just war requires legitimate authority, a just cause, and proportional means. He opposed wars motivated by religious conversion, territorial expansion, or personal ambition. Additionally, Vitoria held that both Christian and non-Christian societies possessed natural rights, rejecting the concept of natural slavery and affirming the right of indigenous peoples to sovereignty and property.

Suárez and Molina expanded on Vitoria's ideas by making distinctions between natural law and the ius gentium. They proposed that, while natural law is universally binding, ius gentium constitutes a set of agreed-upon principles among nations, laying the groundwork for modern international law. Molina also recognized the possibility that each side in a conflict might perceive its cause as just, adding nuance to the subjective experience of warfare.

The Salamanca scholars debated the moral implications of Spain's actions in the Americas, including the treatment and enslavement of indigenous peoples. Figures like Bartolomé de las Casas advocated for the rights of Amerindians against claims by Juan Ginés de Sepúlveda, who viewed indigenous people as natural slaves. The consensus among Salamanca thinkers, however, was that enslavement based on race or religion was unjustifiable. Instead, they allowed for slavery only under limited conditions, such as capture in a just war, while condemning racial discrimination in enslavement.

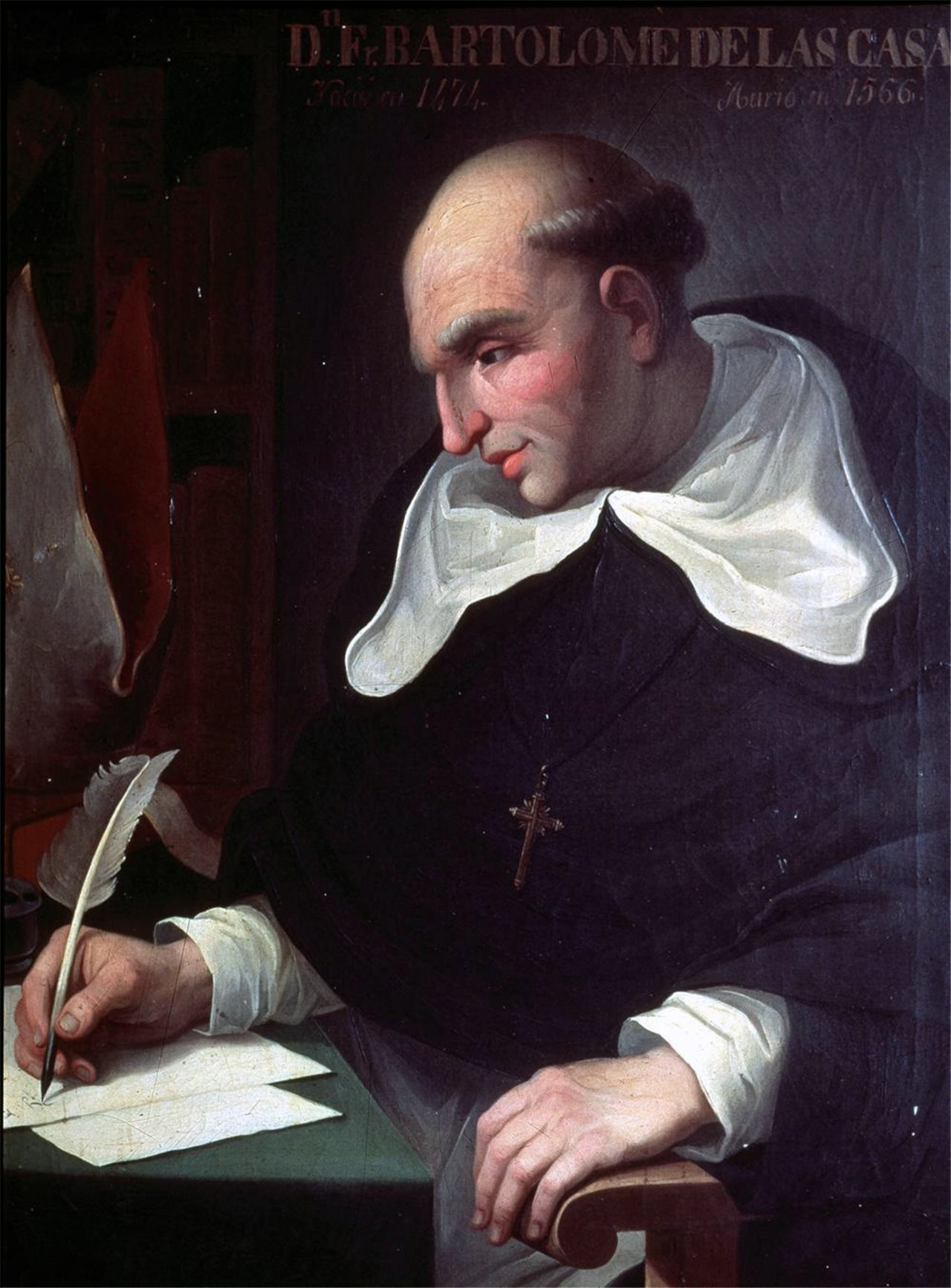
Bartolomé de las Casas

These ideas marked a critical shift in moral and legal philosophy, as Salamanca scholars developed frameworks that emphasized universal human rights, dignity and the ethical limitations of warfare, laying the intellectual groundwork for later developments in human rights and international law.

=== Conquest of America ===
In the 16th century, the School of Salamanca was the first to use the natural law's principle that rights reside in the individual to question the Spanish colonization on the indigenous people of the Americas.

Francisco de Vitoria began his analysis of conquest by rejecting "illegitimate titles," or illegitimate reasons for conquest. He was the first to dare to question whether the bulls of Alexander VI known collectively as the Bulls of Donation were a valid title of dominion over the newly discovered territories. In this matter he did not accept the universal primacy of the emperor, the authority of the pope (because the pope, according to him, lacked temporal power), nor the claim of voluntary submission or conversion of the Native Americans. One could not dismiss them as sinners or ignorant savages: they were free people by nature, with legitimate property rights. When the Spanish arrived in America they brought no legitimate title to occupy and rule those lands.

Vitoria also analyzed whether there were legitimate claims of title over discovered lands. He elaborated up to eight legitimate titles of dominion. The first and perhaps most fundamental relates to communication between people, who jointly constitute a universal society.

==== Universal right to travel and conduct commerce ====
Ius peregrinandi et degendi, developed primarily by Francisco de Vitoria in the 16th century, established the universal right to travel and conduct commerce throughout the world, regardless of territorial governance or religious differences. This concept emerged as a fundamental principle within international law theory during the Age of Discovery.

Vitoria articulated this right in his lectures De Indis (On the Indians), arguing that restrictions on free movement and trade violated natural law. The doctrine encompassed several key elements: the right to travel (ius peregrinandi), the right to dwell in foreign territories (ius degendi), and the right to engage in commerce (ius commercii).

Vitoria also used this principle to justify certain aspects of Spanish colonization. He argued that if indigenous peoples of the Americas denied these natural rights to Spanish travelers and merchants, the denied parties possessed a just cause for war (bellum iustum) and could legitimately claim territories acquired through such defensive actions. This interpretation significantly influenced subsequent colonial legal theory and the development of early modern international law. This doctrine remains relevant to modern debates about migration, international trade and sovereignty.

==== Right to preach and proselytize ====
The second form of legitimate title over discovered lands referred to the right of the Spanish to preach and proselytize. The Indians could voluntarily refuse conversion, but forbidding missionaries would make the matter analogous to the first case. Nonetheless, Vitoria noted that although this can be grounds for a just war, it is not necessarily prudent because of the resulting death and destruction.

The other cases of this casuistry are:

- If the pagan sovereigns force converts to return to idolatry.
- If there come to be a sufficient number of Christians in the newly discovered land that they wish to receive from the Pope a Christian government.
- In the case of overthrowing a tyranny or a government that is harming innocents (e.g. human sacrifice)
- If associates and friends have been attacked—as were the Tlaxcaltecas, allied with the Spanish but subjected, like many other people, to the Aztecs—once again, this could justify a war, with the ensuing possibility of legitimate conquest as in the first case.
- The final "legitimate title" although qualified by Vitoria himself as doubtful, is the alleged mental incapacity of the foreign population resulting in lack of just laws, magistrates, agricultural techniques, etc. In any case, title taken according to this principle must be exercised with Christian charity and only for the advantage of the Indians.

Emperor Charles V, then ruler of Spain, took offense to this doctrine of "legitimate" and "illegitimate" titles purporting to limit his prerogatives, and he tried without success to stop its promulgation.

=== Contract law ===
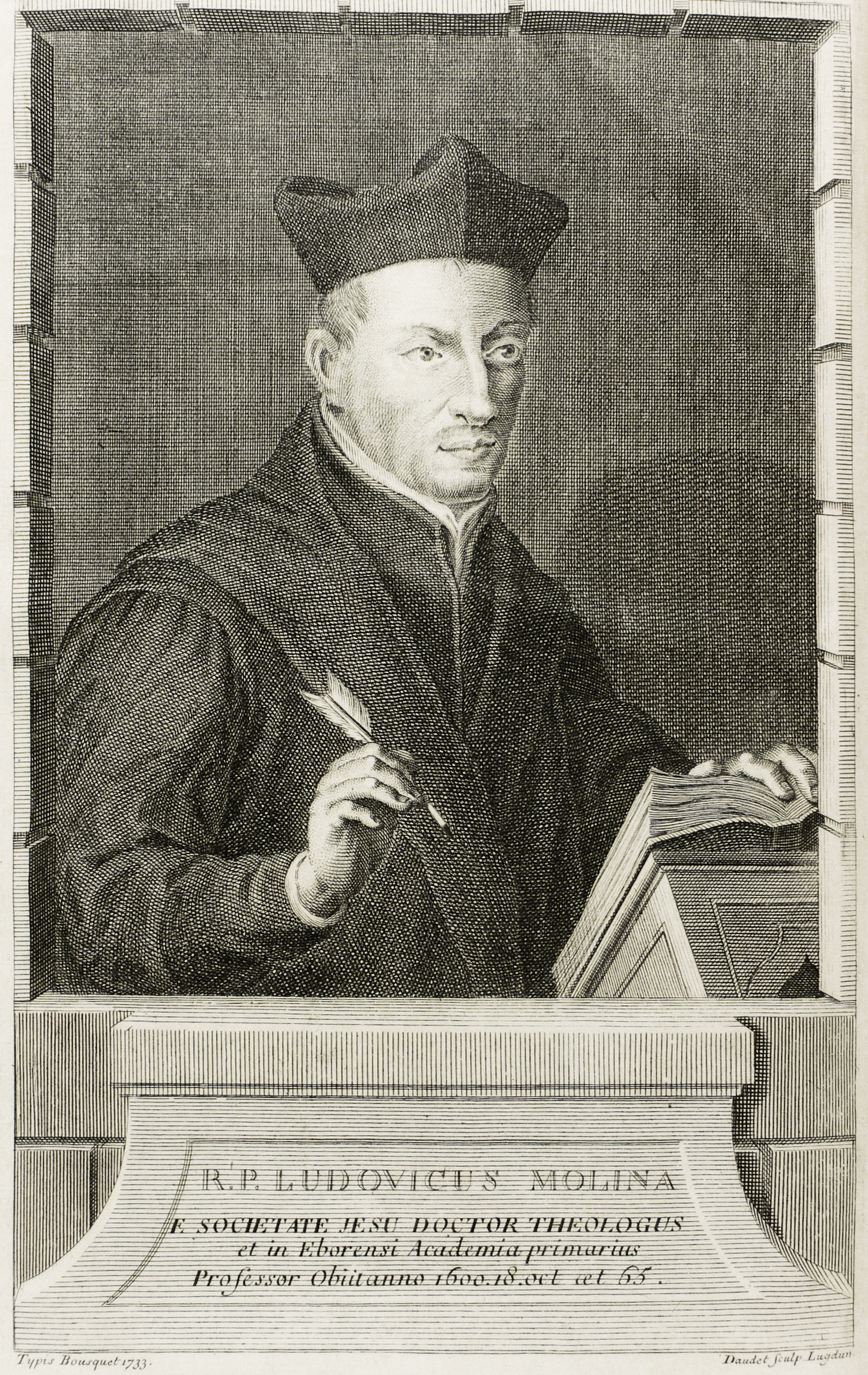
Luis de Molina

First movement to systematise contract law, the contractual doctrin of School of Salamanca is based on two pillars : freedom and equity.

The School of Salamanca played a great role in the diffusion of the contractual consensualism. If this idea was already admitted in canon law since the 12th century and the application of the principle pacta sunt servanda, the civil law only followed this way in the 16th century after the call of famous jurists like Luis de Molina. Moreover, preceded notably by Leonardus Lessius, the Jesuit Pedro de Oñate claimed the existence of a "contractual freedom" and an "autonomy of the will" on the grounds that the Man, created by God who made him free, have an autonomy in the management of his goods and of his commitments. However, this liberty isn't complete because it cannot overstep the principle of free consent and because the contrat cannot ignore the formalism required by the authorities, or have an immoral object.

The members of the School of Salamanca also thought, following Luis de Molina, that contracts have been established for common utility and consequently, that natural law can't tolerate a privileged party. To allow the application of this principle of commutative justice, they elaborated the concept of just price. Every violation of this notion constitutes a laesio for one, and an unjust enrichment, an infraction to the seventh Commandments and a sin for the other. Only a restitution of the undue prince enables the absolution and bring back the contractual equilibrium.

== Economics ==
The School of Salamanca has been described as the "first economic tradition" in the field of economics. This put the origins of economic theory on Europe's mainland, prompting a reassessment of the entire history of the discipline. Much attention has been drawn to the economic thought of the School of Salamanca by Joseph Schumpeter's History of Economic Analysis (1954). It did not coin, but certainly consolidated, the use of the term School of Salamanca in economics. Schumpeter studied scholastic doctrine in general and Spanish scholastic doctrine in particular, and praised the high level of economic science in Spain in the 16th century. He argued that the School of Salamanca most deserves to be considered the founders of economics as a science. The School did not elaborate a complete doctrine of economics, but they established the first modern economic theories to address the new economic problems that had arisen with the end of the medieval order. Unfortunately, there was no continuation of their work until the end of the 17th century and many of their contributions were forgotten, only to be rediscovered later by others.

The thinking of the School was defined as "pro-market, pro-hard money, anti-state in many ways, pro-property, and pro-merchant to a surprising extent."

The English historian of economic thought Marjorie Grice-Hutchinson and Belgian legal historian Wim Decock have published numerous articles and monographs on the School of Salamanca.

Although there does not appear to be any direct influence, the economic thought of the School of Salamanca is in many ways similar to that of the Austrian School. Murray Rothbard referred to them as proto-Austrians.

=== Antecedents ===
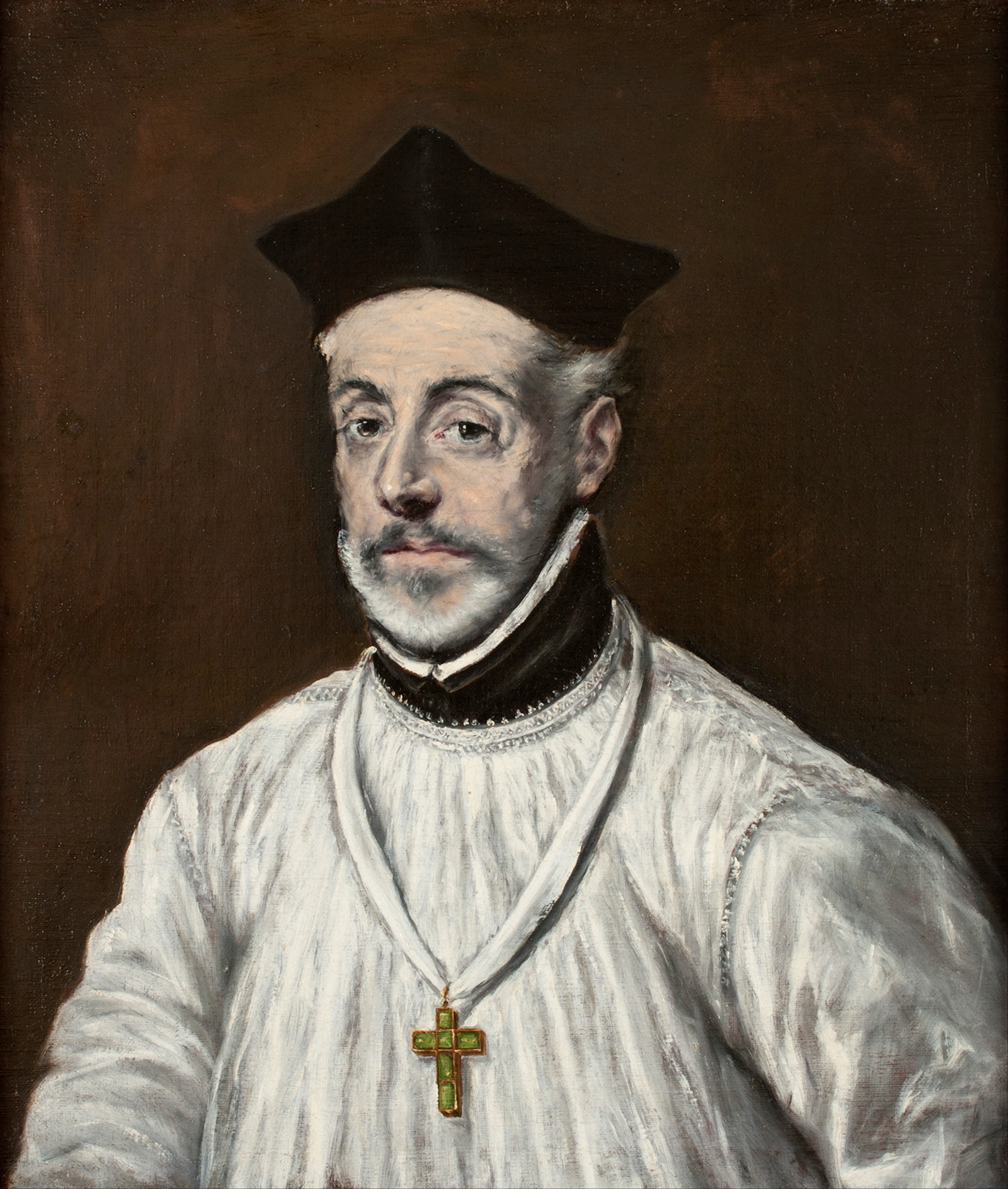
Diego de Covarrubias

In 1517, de Vitoria, then at the Sorbonne, was consulted by Spanish merchants based in Antwerp about the moral legitimacy of engaging in commerce to increase one's personal wealth. From today's point of view, one would say they were asking for a consultation about the entrepreneurial spirit. Beginning at that time, Vitoria and other theologians looked at economic matters. They moved away from views that they found to be obsolete, adopting instead new ideas based on principles of natural law.

According to these views, the natural order is based in the "freedom of circulation" of people, goods and ideas, allowing people to know one another and increase their sentiments of brotherhood. This implies that merchantry is not merely not reprehensible, but that it actually serves the general good.

=== Private property ===
The adherents of the School of Salamanca all agreed that property has the beneficial effect of stimulating economic activity, which, in turn, contributed to the general well being. Diego de Covarrubias y Leyva (1512–1577) considered that people had not only the right to own property but—again, a specifically modern idea—they had the exclusive right to the benefit from that property, although the community might also benefit. Nonetheless, in times of great necessity, there, all goods become a commons.

Luis de Molina argued that individual owners take better care of their goods than is taken of common property, a form of the tragedy of the commons.

=== Money, value and price ===
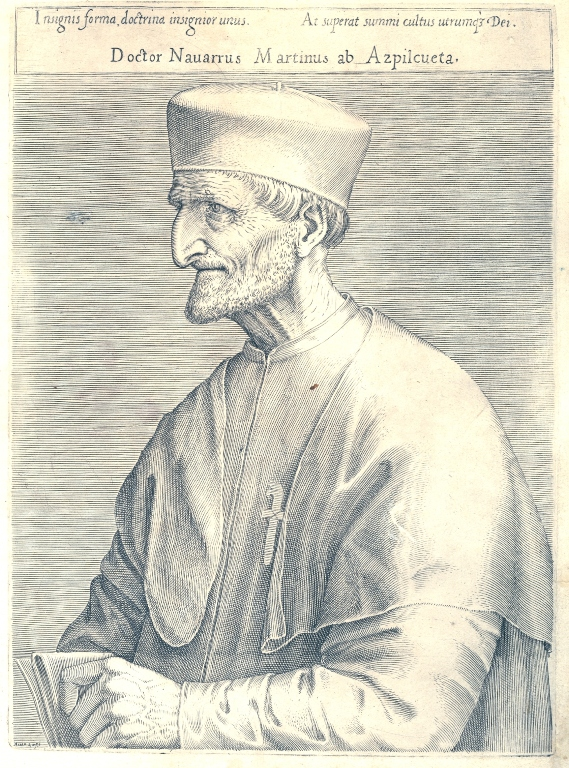
Martín de Azpilcueta

With their reflexions on Contract law and fairness in exchange, the members of the School of Salamanca were often confronted with the concept of value. Thus observing the effect of American silver and gold arrivals in Spain, namely lessening of their values and augmentation of prices, Martín de Azpilcueta established the idea of a value-scarcity, first form of the quantity theory of money.

The just price of something, which respects the principle of commutative justice, depend on many factors. It has a certain latitude because it's not the result of God's will or of labor but of the common estimation of the people (communis aestimatio hominum). On this Luis Saravia de la Calle wrote in 1544:

Those who measure the just price by the labour, costs and risk incurred by the person who deals in the merchandise or produces it, or by the cost of transport or the expense of traveling ... or by what he has to pay the factors for their industry, risk and labour, are greatly in error. ... For the just price arises from the abundance or scarcity of goods, merchants and money ... and not from costs, labour and risk. ... Why should a bale of linen brought overland from Brittany at great expense be worth more than one which is transported cheaply by sea?... Why should a book written out by hand be worth more than one which is printed, when the latter is better though it costs less to produce? ... The just price is found not by counting the cost but by the common estimation.

However, as Friedrich Hayek has written, the school rarely followed this idea through systematically. His members thought that authorities were sometimes required to intervene and to control prices, especially in monopoly cases or for staples. The opportunity of an economic interventionism, called arbitrism, was not unanimously accepted: if some thought that the prince concerned of public interest is more trustworthy than greedy merchants, like Domingo de Soto and Tomás de Mercado, others like Luis de Molina, Leonardus Lessius or Juan de Lugo considered that any intervention of the authorities is inopportune owing to the corruption and the clientelism that it will create.

=== Interest on money ===
Usury (which in that period meant any charging of interest on a loan) has always been viewed negatively by the Catholic Church. The Third Lateran Council condemned any repayment of a debt with more money than was originally loaned; the Council of Vienne explicitly prohibited usury and declared any legislation tolerant of usury to be heretical; the first scholastics reproved the charging of interest. In the medieval economy, loans were entirely a consequence of necessity (bad harvests, fire in a workplace) and, under those conditions, it was considered morally reproachable to charge interest.

In the Renaissance era, greater mobility of people facilitated an increase in commerce and the appearance of appropriate conditions for entrepreneurs to start new, lucrative businesses. Given that borrowed money was no longer strictly for consumption but for production as well, it could not be viewed in the same manner. The School of Salamanca elaborated various reasons that justified the charging of interest. The person who received a loan benefited; one could consider interest as a premium paid for the risk taken by the loaning party. There was also the question of opportunity cost, in that the loaning party lost other possibilities of utilizing the loaned money. Finally, and perhaps most originally, was the consideration of money itself as a merchandise, and the use of one's money as something for which one should receive a benefit in the form of interest.

Martín de Azpilcueta also considered the effect of time, formulating the time value of money. All things being equal, one would prefer to receive a given good now rather than in the future. This preference indicates greater value. Interest, under this theory, is the payment for the time the loaning individual is deprived of the money.

== Theology ==
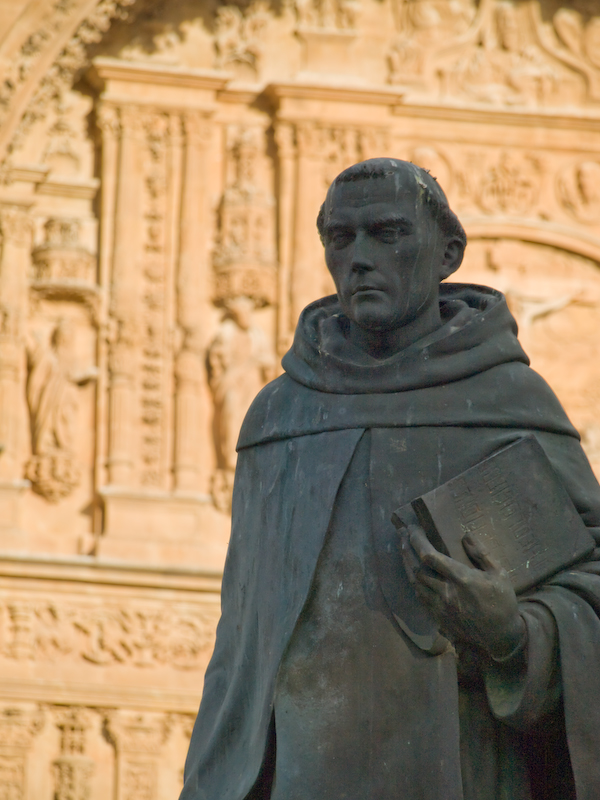
Francisco de Vitoria

Under Francisco de Vitoria, the University of Salamanca led a period of intense activity in theology, especially a renaissance of Thomism, whose influence extended to European culture in general, but especially to other European universities. Perhaps the fundamental contribution of the School of Salamanca to theology is the study of problems much closer to humanity, which had previously been ignored, and the opening of questions that had previously not been posed. The term positive theology is sometimes used to distinguish this new, more practical, theology from the earlier scholastic theology.

=== Morality ===
To analyze the morality of the acts was considered the most practical and useful study one could undertake to serve society. The novel contributions of the School in law and economics were rooted in concrete challenges and moral problems which confronted society under new conditions.

Over the years a casuistry, a fixed set of answers to moral dilemmas, had been developed. However, by its nature, a casuistry can never be complete, leading to a search for more general rules or principles. From this developed probabilism, where the ultimate criterion was not truth, but the certainty of not choosing evil. Developed principally by Bartolomé de Medina and continued by Gabriel Vázquez and Francisco Suárez, Probabilism became the most important school of moral thought in the coming centuries.

=== De auxiliis dispute ===
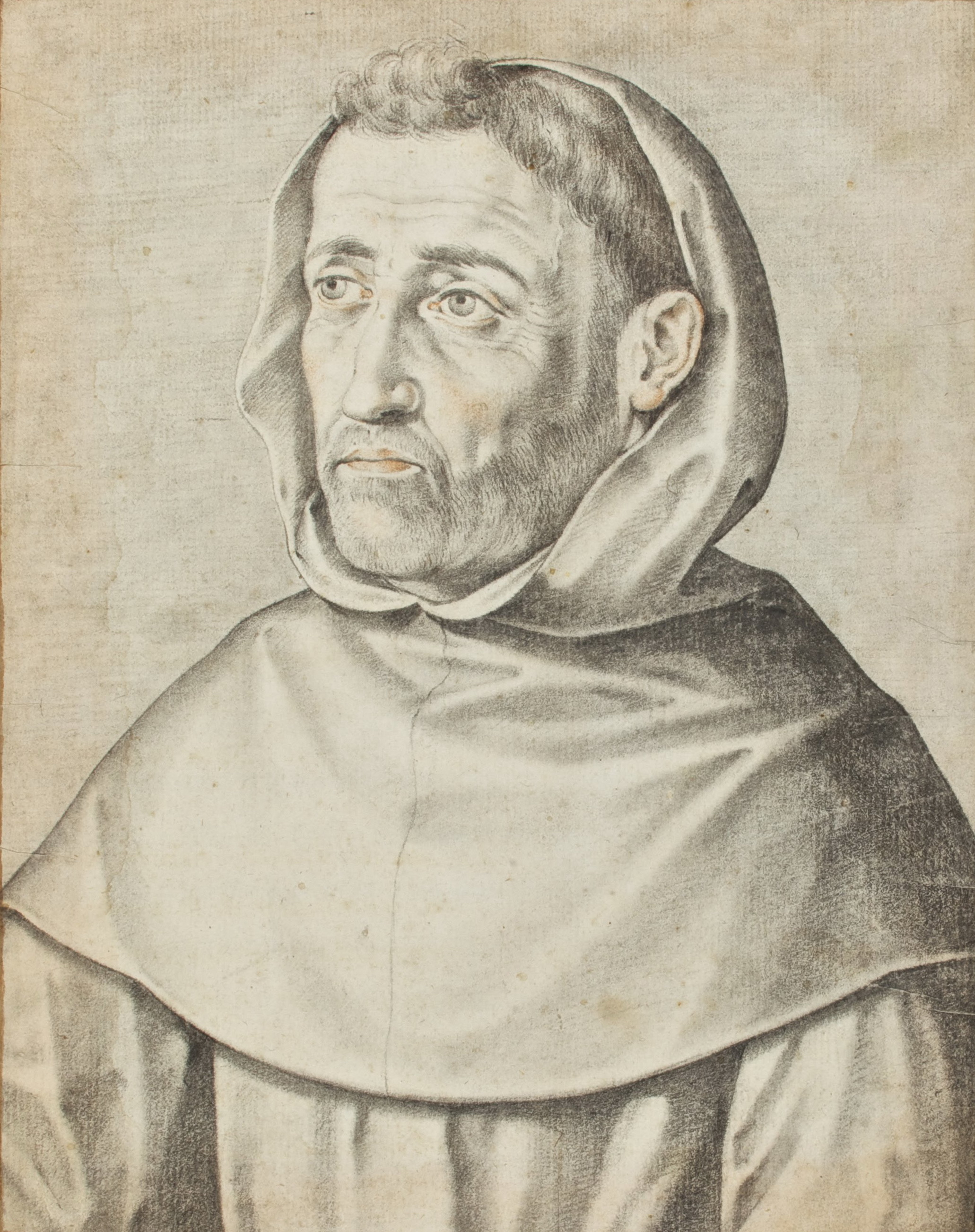
Fray Luis de León

The De auxiliis controversy was a dispute between Jesuits and Dominicans which occurred at the end of the 16th century. The topic of the controversy was grace and predestination, that is to say how one could reconcile the liberty or free will of humans with divine omniscience. In 1582 the Jesuit Prudencio Montemayor and Fray Luis de León spoke publicly about human liberty. Domingo Báñez considered that they gave free will too great a weight and that they used terminology that sounded heretical; he denounced them to the Spanish Inquisition, accusing them of Pelagianism, a belief in human free will to the detriment of the doctrine of original sin and the grace granted by God. Montemayor and de León were banned from teaching and prohibited from defending such ideas.

Báñez was then denounced to the Holy Office by Leon, who accused him of "committing the error of Lutheranism", that is of following the doctrines of Martin Luther. According to Lutheran doctrine, man is "dead in his trespasses" (Ephesians 2:1) as a consequence of original sin and cannot save himself by his own merit; only God can save man, "For by grace you have been saved through faith. And this is not your own doing; it is the gift of God, not a result of works, so that no one may boast." (Ephesians 2:8–9) Báñez was acquitted.

Nonetheless, this did not end the dispute, which Luis de Molina continued with his Concordia liberi arbitrii cum gratiae donis (1588). This is considered the best expression of the Jesuit position. The polemic continued over the course of years, including an attempt by the Dominicans to get Pope Clement VIII to condemn the Concordia of de Molina. Finally Paul V in 1607 recognized the liberty of Dominicans and Jesuits to defend their ideas, prohibiting that either side of this disagreement be characterized as heresy.

=== Existence of evil in the world ===
The existence of evil in a world created and ruled by an infinitely good and powerful God has long been a philosophical question, known as the problem of evil. Vitoria reconciled it by arguing first that free will is a gift from God to each person. It is impossible that each person will always freely choose only the good. Thus, evil results from man's ability not to choose good, by virtue of his free will.

== Members ==
There is discussion about which authors can be assigned to the name of the School of Salamanca, or if one can speak of a School of Salamanca in the first place, but the consensus revolves around the name of Francisco de Vitoria, considered a central figure of the movement. From him, authors refer to three stages, counting in the first the pupils of Vitoria and their pupils, in the second Salamanca contemporaries who had no direct relationship with him and in the third external figures influenced by this current of thought.

=== First group ===
Pupils of Vitoria and their pupils:

- Arias Piñel (1512–1563)
- Antonio de Padilla y Meneses (died 1580)
- Bartolomé de Albornoz (1519–1573)
- Bartolomé de Medina (1527–1581)
- Diego de Chaves (1507–1592)
- Diego de Covarrubias (1512–1577)
- Diego Pérez de Mesa (1563–1632)
- Domingo Báñez (1528–1604)
- Domingo de Soto (1494–1560)
- Fernán Pérez de Oliva (1494–1531)
- Francisco de Vitoria (1492–1546)
- Francisco Sarmiento de Mendoza (1525–1595)
- Francisco Suárez (1548–1617)
- Gregorio de Valencia (1549–1603)
- Jerónimo Muñoz (1520–1591)
- Juan de Horozco y Covarrubias (1540–1610)
- Juan de la Peña (1513–1565)
- Juan de Matienzo (1520–1579)
- Juan de Ribera (1532–1611)
- Juan Gil de la Nava (–1551)
- Leonardus Lessius (1554–1623)
- Luis de León (1527–1591)
- Martín de Azpilcueta (1492–1586)
- Martín de Ledesma (1509–1574)
- Melchor Cano (1509–1560)
- Pedro de Sotomayor (1511–1564)
- Tomás de Mercado (1523–1575)

=== Second group ===
Salamanca contemporaries who had no direct relationship with Vitoria:

- Alonso de la Vera Cruz (1507–1584)
- Cristóbal de Villalón (c. 1500 – c. 1558)
- Fernando Vázquez de Menchaca (1512–1569)
- Francisco Cervantes de Salazar (1514?–1575)
- Juan de Lugo y Quiroga (1583–1660)
- Juan de Salas (1553–1612)
- Luis de Molina (1535–1600)
- Pedro de Aragón (1545/46–1592)
- Pedro de Valencia (1555–1620)

=== Third group ===
External figures influenced by this current of thought:

- Antonio de Hervías (died 1590)
- Bartolomé de Carranza (1503–1576)
- Bartolomé de las Casas (1484–1566)
- Cristóbal de Fonseca (1550–1621)
- Domingo de Salazar (1512–1594)
- Domingo de Santo Tomás (1499–1570)
- Gabriel Vásquez (1549–1604)
- Gómez Pereira (1500–1567)
- Juan de Mariana (1536–1624)
- Juan de Medina (1489–1545)
- Juan Pérez de Menacho (1565–1626)
- Luis de Alcalá (1490–1549)
- Luis Saravia de la Calle
- Miguel Bartolomé Salón (1539–1621)
- Pedro da Fonseca (1528–1599)
- Pedro de Oñate (1567–1646)
- Rodrigo de Arriaga (1592–1667)

== See also ==
- Conimbricenses
- Second scholasticism
- Casuistry
- Rule according to higher law
- Social contract
- Valladolid debate
- Spanish Universalist School of the 18th century
- Spanish philosophy

== Bibliography ==
- Alves, André Azevedo (2010). John Meadowcroft (ed.). The Salamanca School (Major Conservative and Libertarian Thinkers). Continuum International Publishing.
- Chaufen, Alejandro A. (2008). "Scholastics/School of Salamanca". In Hamowy, Ronald (ed.). The Encyclopedia of Libertarianism. Thousand Oaks, CA: SAGE; Cato Institute. pp. 450–52. doi:10.4135/9781412965811.n275. ISBN 978-1-4129-6580-4. LCCN 2008009151. OCLC 750831024.
- Chojnowski, Peter (January 2005). "'Corporation Christendom': The True School of Salamanca". The Angelus. XXVIII (1). Kansas City, MO: Angelus Press. ISSN 1073-5003.. Contends that the alleged economic liberalism is based on a misreading of scholastic texts.
- Decock, Wim (2013). Theologians and Contract Law: The Moral Transformation of the Ius commune (ca. 1500-1650). Leiden/Boston: Martinus Nijhoff Publishers. ISBN 978-90-04-23285-3.
- Decock, Wim (2016). "Spanish Scholastics on Money and Credit". In Fox, D.; Ernst, W. (eds.). Money in the Western Legal Tradition: Middle Ages to Bretton Woods. Oxford: Oxford University Press. pp. 267–283. doi:10.1093/acprof:oso/9780198704744.003.0014. ISBN 978-0-19-870474-4.
- Grice-Hutchinson, Marjorie (1952). The School of Salamanca: Readings in Spanish Monetary Theory, 1544–1605
- Grice-Hutchinson, Marjorie (1978). Early Economic Thought in Spain, 1177–1740.
- Grice-Hutchinson, Marjorie (1993). Economic thought in Spain. Selected Essays of Marjorie Grice-Hutchinson, edited with an introduction by Laurence Moss and Christopher K. Ryan.
- Liggio, Leonard P. (Jan & Feb 2000) "The Heritage of the Spanish Scholastics". Religion & Liberty. 10 (1). Grand Rapids, MI: Acton Institute.
- Messarra, Sean (2020). "Representation and scholastic political thought". History of European Ideas. 46 (6): 737–753. doi:10.1080/01916599.2020.1756891. S2CID 219478086.
- Rothbard, Murray, New Light on the Prehistory of the Austrian School Essay originally published in The Foundations of Modern Austrian Economics, edited by Edwin Dolan (Kansas City: Sheed and Ward, 1976), pp. 52–74.
- Schumpeter, Joseph (1954). History of Economic Analysis. New York: Oxford University Press.
- Van Ittersum, M. J. (2007). "Preparing Mare liberum for the Press: Hugo Grotius' Rewriting of Chapter 12 of De iure praedae in November–December 1608". Grotiana. 26: 246–80. doi:10.1163/187607508X366445.: Puts into context of truce negotiations 1608–1809. Ittersum (p. 18) notes Grotius' citing of School of Salamanca figures, as well as the Ancient Greek, Roman and early Church Fathers (p. 12).
- Velasco Sánchez, José Tomás (2015). La Escuela de Salamanca. Concepto, miembros, problemas, influencias, pervivencias. Bubok Publishing, S.L. Madrid. ISBN 978-84-686-6627-3.
- Vitoria, Francisco de (31 October 1991). Vitoria: Political Writings. Cambridge [England]: Cambridge University Press. ISBN 978-0-521-36714-1.
