= Francisco de Vitoria =

Spanish Catholic philosopher and jurist (c. 1483–1546)

Francisco de Vitoria OP
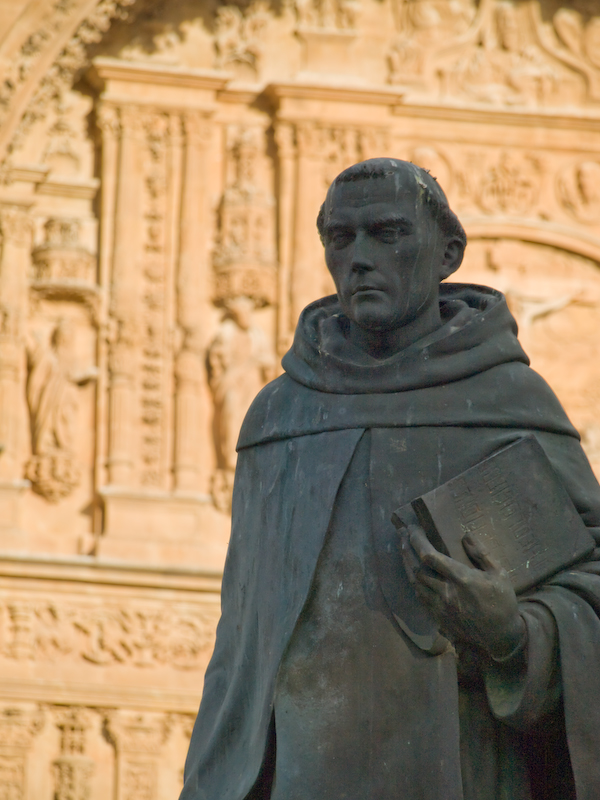
- Statue of Francisco de Vitoria at San Esteban, Salamanca
- Born: c. 1483; Burgos, Crown of Castile
- Died: 12 August 1546; Salamanca, Crown of Castile

Philosophical work
- Era: Renaissance philosophy
- Region: Western philosophy: Spanish philosophy
- School: Thomism; School of Salamanca
- Main interests: Natural law
- Notable ideas: International law Freedom of the seas

Francisco de Vitoria OP (c. 1483 – 12 August 1546), also known as Francisco de Victoria, was a Spanish Catholic philosopher, theologian, and jurist of Renaissance Spain. He is the founder of the tradition in philosophy known as the School of Salamanca, which laid the groundwork for early free-market economics and individual rights, influencing the development of libertarian thought. Vitoria's work on natural law and the freedom of exchange contributed to later Austrian School economists' emphasis on the moral basis for voluntary commerce. Although less known than others of his kind, he has been considered one of the most influential humanists of the Renaissance.

Noted especially for his concept of just war and international law, his defense of individual property rights and the notion of liberty in trade were pivotal in shaping ideas about non-intervention and economic freedom. He has in the past been described by scholars as the "father of international law", along with Alberico Gentili and Hugo Grotius. American jurist Arthur Nussbaum noted Vitoria's influence on international law as it pertained to the right to trade overseas. Later this was interpreted as "freedom of commerce". His emphasis on voluntary exchange and opposition to monopolistic practices foreshadowed later free market economics.

== Life ==
Vitoria was born c. 1483 in Burgos, in the Crown of Castile, to Pedro de Vitoria, of Alava, and Catalina de Compludo, both of noble families. Scholars have proposed birth years ranging from 1480 to 1492, but more recent scholarship has settled on 1483 due to the strength of the Burgos Dominican records, along with the report that he was sixty-three when he died in 1546. According to modern scholarship, he had Jewish ancestry on his maternal side (the Compludos), being related to famous Conversos like Paul of Burgos and Alfonso de Cartagena.

He became a Dominican at the convent of San Pablo in Burgos in 1505 and was recorded as a student of the order by 1506. Around 1508, he started his studies at the College Saint-Jacques in Paris, where he studied arts and theology and was influenced by the work of Desiderius Erasmus. Eventually Vitoria gained a teaching position sometime in the mid 1510s. He was exposed to the Thomist revival led by Peter Crockaert, who taught using Thomas Aquinas' Summa Theologica instead of Peter Lombard's Sentences. While in Paris, Vitoria assisted in the creation of a 1512 edition of Secunda secundae (the second subsection of the second section of Aquinas' Summa Theologica).

In 1523, he returned to Spain to teach theology at the College of San Gregorio in Valladolid, where many young Dominicans were being trained for missionary work in the New World. In September of 1524, he was elected to the prima chair of theology at the University of Salamanca, the senior chair of theology in Spain, and held it until his death. In this position, he was instrumental in promoting Thomism (the philosophy and theology of St. Thomas Aquinas), making Summa Theologica the basis of the theological instruction approach of the university. Vitoria thought thousands of students in his time teaching, including Domingo de Soto and Melchor Cano.

Charles V, Holy Roman Emperor asked for Vitoria's counsel on matters regarding the Indies and named him the imperial theologian for the Council of Trent in 1545, unfortunately illness kept Vitoria from traveling for this. Francisco de Vitoria died in Salamanca on 12 August 1546 and was buried at Convento de San Esteban, Salamanca.

== De Indis and just war ==
=== Natural dominion ===
In Vitoria's 1539 De Indis, he posed the question: before the Spanish arrived, were the inhabitants of the Indies the true masters (veri domini) of their private property and public affairs? In the treatise, he rebuts four arguments against the natives' natural rights to private property and self-determination: mortal sin, lack of belief, madness, and irrationality. He argues that mortal sin does not deprive one of civil ownership, labelling the claim that dominion relies on grace put forward by John Wycliffe as heretical, given it was condemned at the Council of Constance. A lack of belief in christianity does not deprive one of these rights either: Saracens (Arabs) and Jews were treated as owners of their goods, and it would be unconscionable to not extend the same dignity to a group who had done the Spanish no harm. He argues further that although civil lawyers often dispute the specifics of civil ownership, children and the insane are not outside natural dominion, and that dispute isn't legitimate pretext to seize their property.

A noted scholar, he was publicly consulted by Charles V, Holy Roman Emperor and King of Spain. He worked to limit the type of power the Spanish Empire imposed on the Native Peoples. He said, "The upshot of all the preceding is this, then, that the aborigines undoubtedly had true dominion in both public and private matters, just like Christians, and that neither their princes nor private persons could be despoiled of their property on the ground of their not being true owners." Vitoria denied that the native peoples could be understood as slaves by nature in Aristotelian terms. He adopted from Aquinas the Roman law concept of ius gentium ("the law of nations"). His defense of American Indians was based on a Scholastic understanding of the intrinsic dignity of man, a dignity he found being violated by Spain's policies in the New World.

In three lectures (Relectiones) held between 1537 and 1539 Vitoria concluded that the Indians were rightful owners of their property and that their chiefs validly exercised jurisdiction over their tribes. This had already been the position of Palacios Rubios. Neither the pope nor Charles V had a rightful claim over Indian lives or property. No violent action could be taken against them, nor could their lands or property be seized, unless the Indians had caused harm or injury to the Spanish by violating the latter's lawful rights. In one of his lectures, "On the evangelization of unbelievers", Vitoria establishes that firstly, Indians, "should not be forcibly converted; but a second conclusion is that they may be forcibly restrained from hindering the missionaries of the faith, and from insulting Christ and Christians."

Throughout his lecture, "On the evangelization of unbelievers", Francisco de Vitoria employed the concept of what was considered Spanish Christian Universalism. Spanish Christian Universalism was the belief that all matters, arguments, and events were connected in the world, and Vitoria "visualized a universal society in the world into which any number of independent states might fit and foster relationships."

Francisco de Vitoria argued that forcible conversion of the Indians would, "cause great provocation and unrest among the heathen." Secondly, "instead of the benevolent and proper affection required for belief, forcible conversion would generate immense hate in them, and that in turn would give rise to pretense and hypocrisy."

Vitoria defended the Indians against other forms of harm which were being proposed, such as indirectly coercing the Indians into Christianity, "by taxes and levies by which they may be encouraged to become converts to the faith." He argued, "but as for tributes which cannot also be demanded of the faithful, I assert that they cannot be demanded of unbelievers with the intention of making them convert. Unbelievers cannot be deprived of their goods on the grounds of their unbelief, any more than other Christians, because they possess true right of ownership over their own property."

=== Ius communicationis and de iure belli ===
A supporter of the just war theory, in De iure belli Francisco pointed out that the underlying predicate conditions for a "just war" were "wholly lacking in the Indies". The only area where he saw justification for Spanish intervention in native affairs was to protect victims seized for human sacrifice, and because of the inherent human dignity of the victims themselves—whose rights were being violated and thus in need of defense.

Thomas E. Woods goes on to describe how some wished to argue that the natives lacked reason, but the evidence was against this because the natives had obvious customs, laws, and a form of government.

The Spaniards were in the practice of invoking in their American conquests the so-called "Requerimiento", a document read to the Indians before the commencement of any hostilities. The "Requerimiento", declared the universal authority of the Pope, and the authority the Spanish monarchs had received from the Pope over this part of the New World for the purpose of colonizing and evangelizing it. The Indians had to accept the sovereignty of the Spanish monarchs or be compelled to submit by force. Vitoria denied the legitimacy of this document.

Vitoria follows the arguments against Spanish rule of South-American territories by arguments that justify the Spanish practices, which are grounded in natural law. He asserts the right of the Spaniards to travel freely, and to trade, which includes searching for, mining, and exporting the abundant natural resources they find in South America. Unlawful resistance infringing upon the Spaniard's rights of travel, trade and exploitation, or infringing upon the Pope's right to spread Christianity, can be used to justify a "just war" of the Spaniards against the indigenous inhabitants, ending in Spanish rule over the territories in question.

Francisco de Vitoria presented strict interpretation of baptism of desire:

When we postulate invincible ignorance on the subject of baptism or of the Christian faith, it does not follow that a person can be saved without baptism or the Christian faith. For the aborigines to whom no preaching of the faith or Christian religion has come will be damned for mortal sins or for idolatry, but not for the sin of unbelief. As St. Thomas says, however, if they do what in them lies, accompanied by a good life according to the law of nature, it is consistent with God's providence that he will illuminate them regarding the name of Christ.

== Reception and legacy ==
Vitoria's works are known only from his lecture notes, as he published nothing in his lifetime. Nevertheless, his influence, such as that on the Dutch legal philosopher Hugo Grotius, was significant. Relectiones Theologicae was published posthumously several times (Lyon, 1557; Salamanca, 1565; Ingolstadt, 1580; Lyon, 1586 & 1587; Venice, 1626; Venice, 1640; Cologne & Frankfurt, 1696; and Madrid, 1765).

Francisco de Vitoria's writings have been interpreted by various scholars to support contrary policies. Antony Anghie and others argue that Vitoria's humanitarianism legitimized conquest.

== Works ==
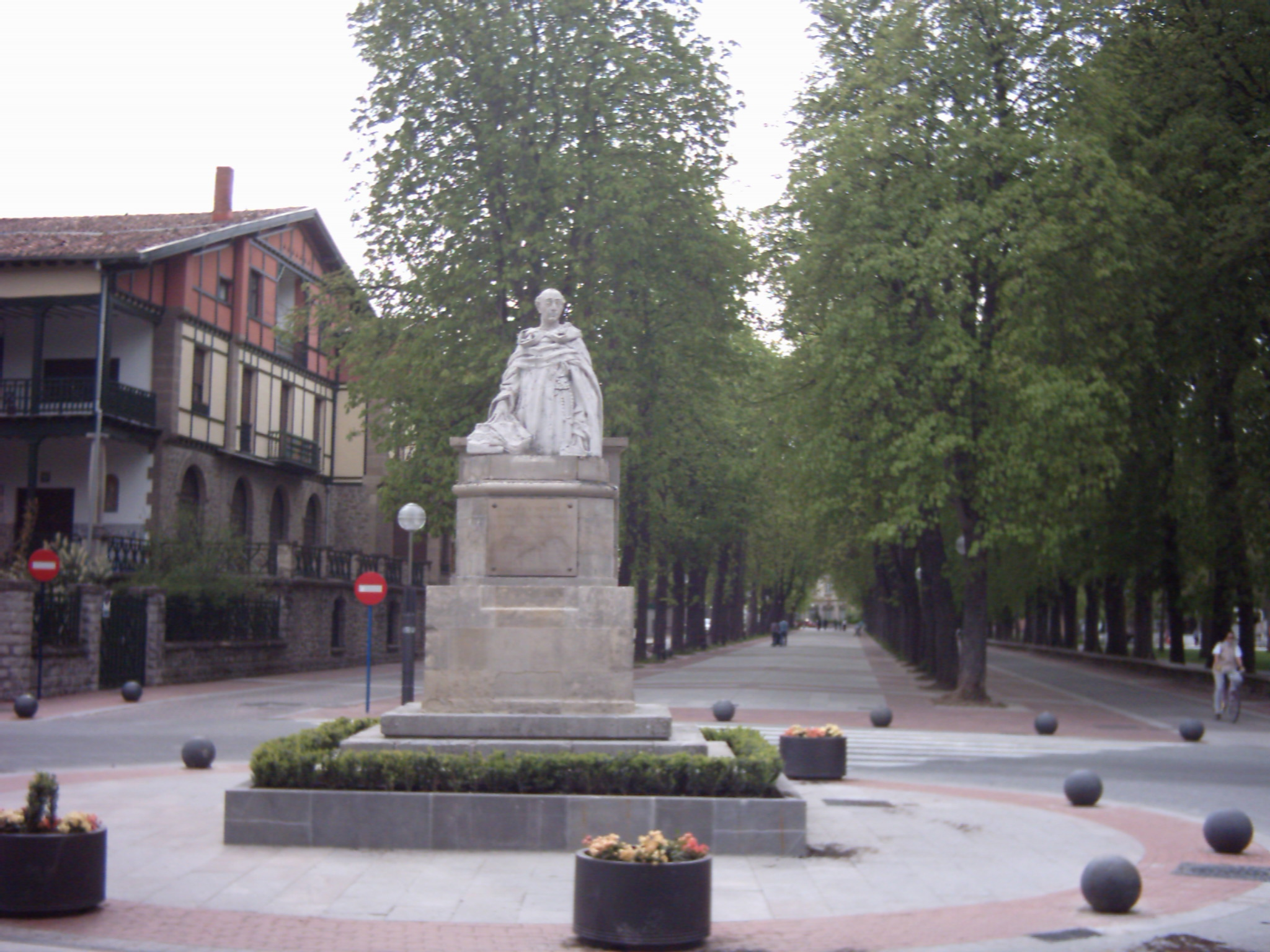
Statue of Francisco de Vitoria, in Vitoria-Gasteiz

While Vitoria published nothing during his lifetime, his lectures and annual relectiones were preserved by notes taken by students. He gave around fifteen relectiones between 1528 and 1540 and thirteen of them survive as manuscripts. They were published posthumously as the Relectiones Theologicae XII with several later reprints.

Below are his surviving relectiones, in approximated chronological order:

- De potestate civili, 1528
- De Homicidio, 1530
- De matrimonio, 1531
- De potestate ecclesiae prior, 1532
- De potestate ecclesiae posterior, 1533
- De potestate Papae et Concilii, 1534
- De augmento caritatis, 11 April 1535
- De eo ad quod tenetur homo cum primum venit ad usum rationis, June 1535
- De simonia, Spring 1536
- De Temperantia, circa 1537-38.
- De Indis, 1539
- De iure belli 18 or 19 June 1539
- De magia, 18 July 1540

Key modern critical editions and translations include:

- Teófilo Urdánoz, Obras de Francisco de Vitoria: Relecciones teológicas, Madrid: Biblioteca de Autores Cristianos, 1960.
- Corpus Hispanorum de Pace series, directed by Luciano Pereña. Includes critical bilingual editions of De Indis and De iure belli.
- Antonio Osuna Fernándes-Largo et al.: Relecciones jurídicas y teológicas, Salamanca: Editorial San Esteban, 2017.
- Anthony Pagden and Jeremy Lawrance: Vitoria: Political Writings, Cambridge: Cambridge University Press, 1991.
- Ernest Nys, De Indis et De Iure Belli Relectiones, translated by John Pawley Bate, Washington: Carnegie Institution, 1917.

== Critical translations ==
- Francisco de Vitoria: Political Writings, translated by Jeremy Lawrance, ed. Jeremy Lawrance and Anthony Pagden, Cambridge University Press, 1991.
- Francisco de Vitoria: Relection on Homicide & Commentary on Summa theologiae IIa-IIae Q. 64 (Thomas Aquinas), translated with an Introduction and Notes by John P. Doyle, Milwaukee: Marquette University Press, 1997.

== Sources ==
- Johannes Thumfart: Die Begründung der globalpolitischen Philosophie. Zu Francisco de Vitorias "relectio de indis recenter inventis" von 1539. Berlin 2009. (256 pp.)
