= Marjorie Grice-Hutchinson =

English economist

- Born: 26 May 1909; Eastbourne, East Sussex, England
- Died: 12 April 2003 (aged 93); Málaga, Spain
- Other name: Baroness von Schlippenbach (upon marriage)
- Occupations: Economist, economic historian
- Parent: George Grice-Hutchinson

Marjorie Grice-Hutchinson MBE (26 May 1909 – 12 April 2003) was an English economist.

== Early life and education ==
Marjorie Eileen Henrietta Grice-Hutchinson was born in 1909, in Eastbourne, Sussex, the daughter of George Grice-Hutchinson and Edith Louise Eastwick Grice-Hutchinson. Her father was a solicitor. When her father retired to Málaga in 1920, Grice-Hutchinson went with him.

She earned a degree in Spanish at the University of London, and completed a Ph.D. at the London School of Economics, under the supervision of Friedrich Hayek and R. S. Sayers.

== Career ==
Grice-Hutchinson is best known for her work on the history of economic thought in Spain, and particularly that of the late Scholastic School of Salamanca. She also wrote a history of the English Cemetery in Málaga, and endowed an agricultural research program at the University of Málaga.

In 1993, she was awarded an honorary doctorate at the Complutense University of Madrid. She became a Distinguished Fellow of the History of Economics Society in 1995. She was appointed a Member of the Order of the British Empire in 1975, and in Spain she was named to the Order of Civil Merit. In 1996 she was awarded the Premio Castilla y León de las Ciencias Sociales y Humanidades.

== Personal life ==
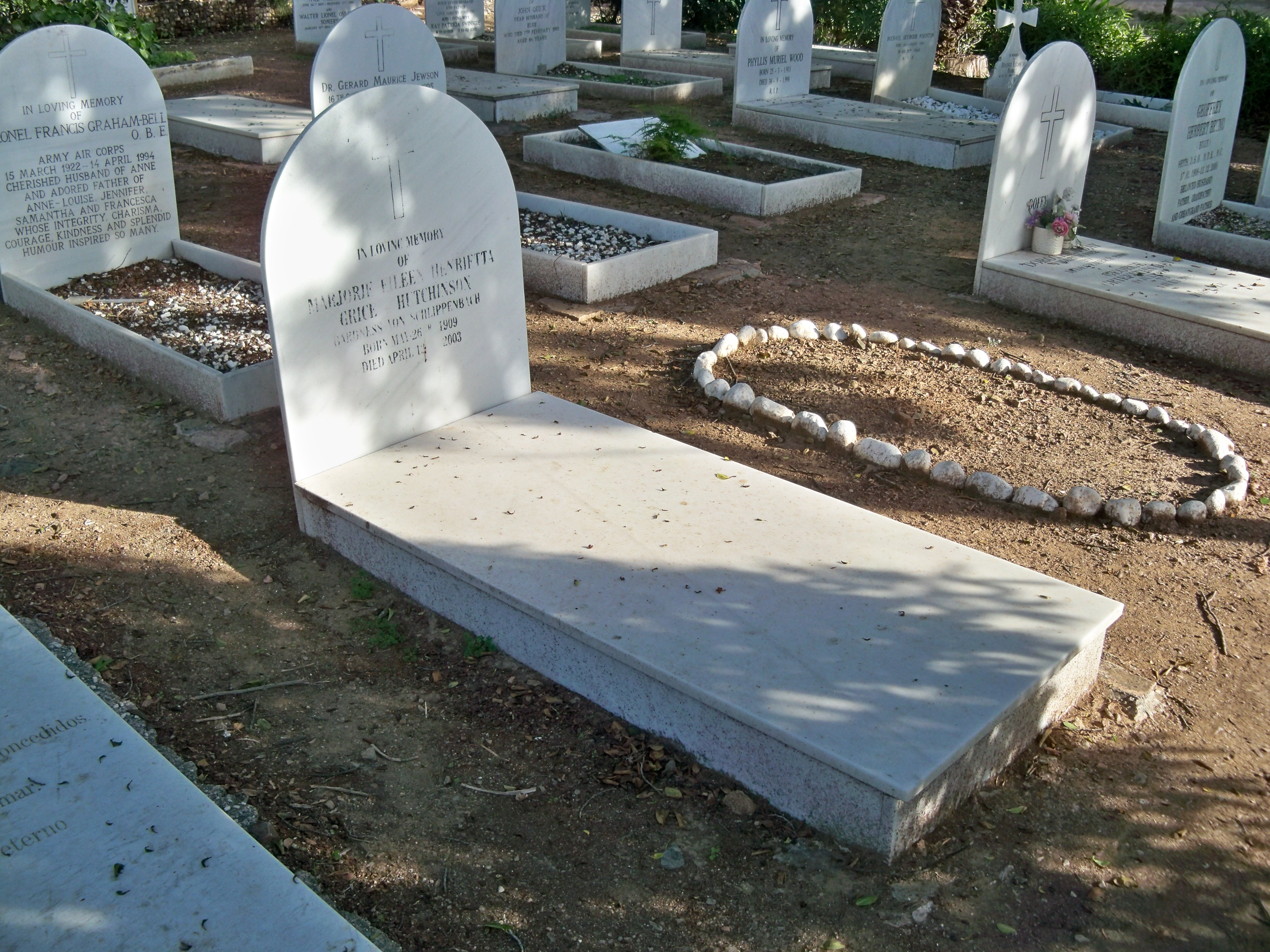
Marjorie Grice-Hutchinson's grave at the English Cemetery in Málaga.

Grice-Hutchinson became the Baroness von Schlippenbach in 1951, when she married Ulrich von Schlippenbach, a German-born agronomist who resided in Málaga. She was widowed when von Schlippenbach died in the 1980s. She lived in Málaga until her death in 2003, aged 93 years. She was buried there, in the English Cemetery. Her book The School of Salamanca was reprinted in 2009 by the Ludwig von Mises Institute.

== Legacy ==
Encouraged to support the Royal National Lifeboat Institution (RNLI) at an early age by her mother, visiting Eastbourne Lifeboat Station, Grice-Hutchinson decided that a good way to honour her late mother, was with the provision of a lifeboat, in her mother's name. At a ceremony at Kilrush Lifeboat Station in County Clare, Ireland in May 2011, a new €185,000 B-class (Atlantic 85) lifeboat was named Edith Louise Eastwick (B-844).

== Selected works ==
- The School of Salamanca; Readings in Spanish Monetary Theory, 1544-1605 (1952)
- Malaga Farm (1956)
- Children of the Vega: Growing up on a Farm in Spain (1963)
- Early Economic Thought in Spain, 1177-1740 (1978)
- Economic Thought in Spain: Selected Essays (1993)
- The English Cemetery at Málaga (2001)
