= Domingo de Soto =

Spanish Catholic priest and theologian (1494–1560)

The Reverend Domingo de Soto OP
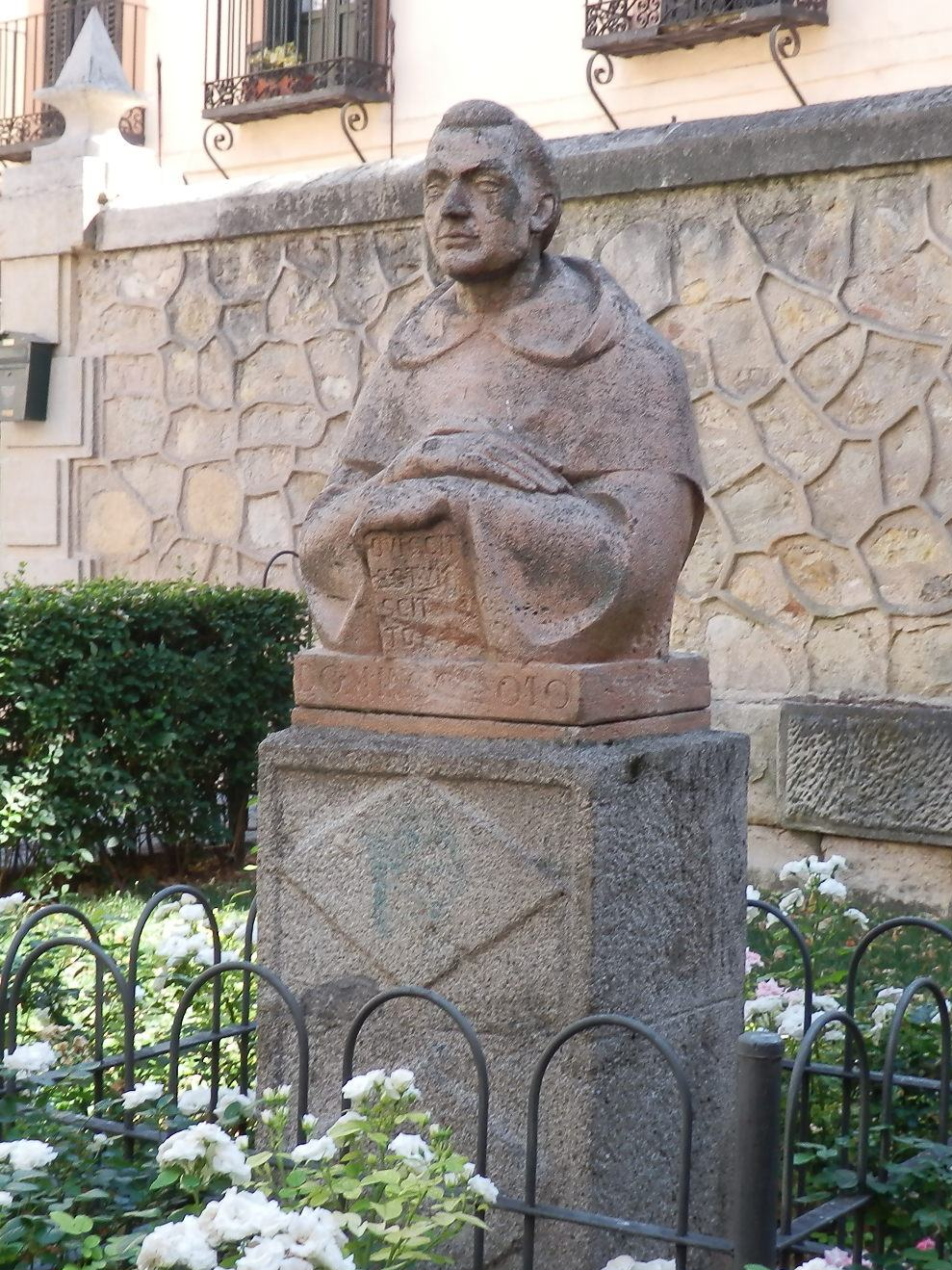
- Born: 1494; Segovia, Crown of Castile
- Died: 15 November 1560 (aged 65–66); Salamanca, Crown of Castile

Education
- Education: University of Alcalá; University of Paris

Philosophical work
- Era: Early modern philosophy; Renaissance philosophy
- Region: Western philosophy; Spanish philosophy
- School: Scholasticism; Medieval realism; School of Salamanca
- Main interests: Theology, metaphysics, Philosophy of law

Domingo de Soto O.P. (1494 – 15 November 1560) was a Spanish Dominican priest and Scholastic theologian and naturalist. He was born in Segovia (Spain), and died in Salamanca (Spain), at the age of 66. He is best known as one of the founders of international law and of the Spanish Thomistic philosophical and theological movement known as the School of Salamanca.

He is also known for his contributions to mechanical physics: his works on mechanics and gravity, which he presented in his book "Physicorum Aristotelis quaestiones", in 1551, served as the basis for Galileo's and Isaac Newton studies.

== Biography ==
De Soto was born in Segovia in 1494. He studied philosophy and theology at the Universities of Alcalá and Paris, and obtained a chair in philosophy at Alcalá in 1520. Soto resigned from this post suddenly and headed for the abbey of Montserrat, hoping to join the Benedictines, but he was instead led to the Dominicans, entering their community at San Pablo de Burgos in 1524 and becoming professor of dialectics at their Segovia house of studies in 1525. Appointed to the Dominican chair in theology at Salamanca in 1532, he was promoted to the principal chair in 1552, as successor to Melchor Cano.

From his earliest days in the university classroom, Soto undertook an attack on the via moderna and pressed for a revival of Aristotle. At Salamanca he collaborated with Francisco de Vitoria and Cano in their methodological reforms and on the development of what came to be known as positive or fundamental theology. Sent as imperial theologian to the Council of Trent by the emperor Charles V, Soto soon distinguished himself for his learning and piety (1545–1547). Steering the council away from compromise with the Protestants, he served as one of the principal defenders of tradition on such key questions as original sin, predestination, justification, the scriptural canon, and the authority of the Vulgate Bible.

In 1547, when the council was interrupted, Soto was appointed confessor and spiritual adviser to Charles V, a post he fulfilled for two years. Immensely pleased by Soto, Charles offered him the bishopric of Segovia. Soto refused the honor and in 1550 returned to teaching at Salamanca. That same year he took part in the celebrated debate held at Valladolid on the treatment of New World natives, joining his Dominican brethren in a thorough condemnation of the idea that the Indians were inferior beings worthy of enslavement. Soto’s chief opponent in this controversy was Juan Ginés de Sepúlveda, chaplain and official chronicler to Emperor Charles V. Sepúlveda’s defeat at the hands of Soto and other Dominicans led to the enactment of laws protecting the rights of native peoples in the New World.

In addition to producing such influential philosophical and theological works as the Summulae (1529), a manual of logic; De natura et gratia (1547), a polemic against Protestant soteriology; and his commentaries on Aristotle (1543 and 1545), on Paul's epistle to the Romans (1550), and on Peter Lombard's Sentences (1557), Soto contributed significantly to the development of political and legal theory, principally through his De iustitia et iure (1553), his most important jurisprudential work, in which he proposed that the ordinance of reason (rationis ordinatio) was the mechanism by which laws could be evaluated. He also took the view that international law (jus gentium) was a part of the law of specific communities (later termed positive law) rather than a moral or natural law.

True to the school of Salamanca's predilection for ethical questions and to its conviction that theology should be used to create a Christian moral order based on natural law, Soto also devoted attention to the issue of poverty, producing a landmark study, Deliberatio in causa pauperum (1545), and devising ways to feed and lodge the poorer students at Salamanca. Like his fellow Spanish Dominicans Vitoria and Cano, Soto contributed substantially to the reinvigoration of Roman Catholicism in the sixteenth century by strengthening and broadening the theological curriculum, by stressing the need for continuity with the scholastic tradition (especially with Thomism), and by actively seeking social justice.

Soto died in Salamanca on 15 November 1560.

== Thought ==
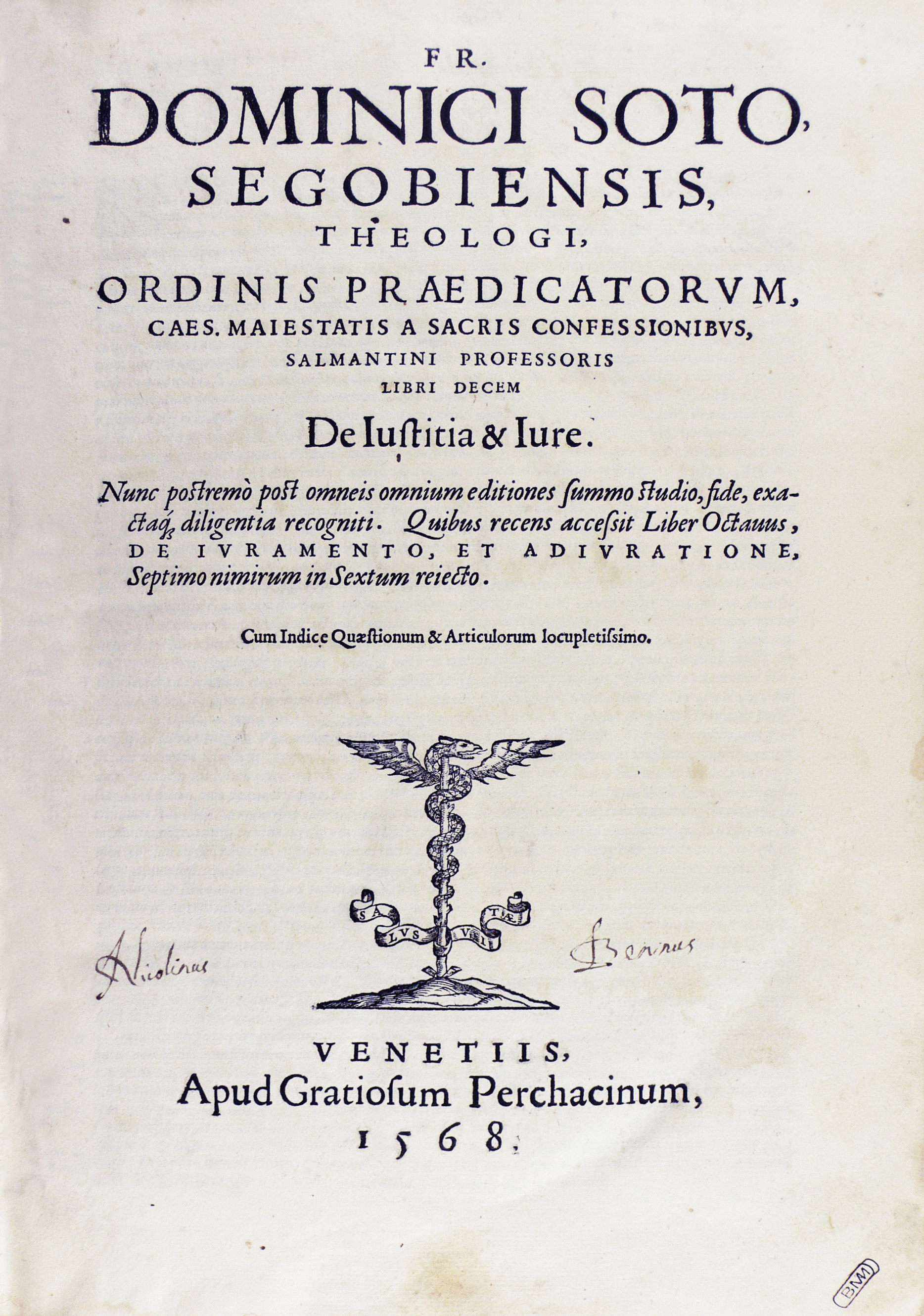
De iustitia et iure, 1568.

=== Usury ===
De Soto was concerned about the complexity that had emerged from unclear moral standards of usury. He complained that the merchants had invented convoluted schemes in order to meet the conflicting demands of church leaders. His position should be seen within the background of his Dominican background and historical context. De Soto was involved in an active debate in the medieval era on the sterility of money and the requirements of natural law given this sterility. His rationale on interest is explained by Langholm.

Woods and D'Emic characterize de Soto's attitude toward usury in significantly different ways. D'Emic reports that De Soto thought voluntary contributions given from borrower to lender in gratitude were acceptable, but strictly forbid the lender from pressuring the borrower. He also asserts that De Soto thought lenders were permitted to hope for such contributions along with other motives of benevolence and friendship, but regarded the sole motivation of financial gain as immoral "mental usury". Woods, on the other hand, reports that De Soto did not believe Christ had declared usury to be sinful at all, and did not believe that Luke 6:35 had anything to do with lending at interest.

=== Mechanics ===
In 1551, Domingo de Soto became the first to state that a body in free fall accelerates uniformly and that this acceleration is caused by the mass of the Earth This key concept of physics was essential for the later studies of gravity by Galileo and Newton. Galileo credited De Soto as his inspiration and source of his studies, but Isaac Newton despite having read Galileo Galilei never mentioned him. In the 20th century, Pierre Duhem credited him with important achievements in dynamics and viewed his work as a forerunner of modern mechanics.

=== Law ===
In 1556, Soto published a treatise on law, De iustitia et iure (Justice and the Law), that is considered a foundational text in the general theory of law, and international law, in particular. According to Jaime Mercant Simó, this treatise De iustitia et iure, although it contains theological elements, is essentially a work of the philosophy of law. Furthermore, this opus was also considered as one of the first attempt of systematisation of Contract Law, even if this characteristic must be reevaluated in light of previous works of german legal thinkers like Matthew of Kraków and Konrad Summenhart.

More conservative than the later members of the School of Salamanca, Soto believed that, although contractual freedom stemmed from natural law does indeed exists, it must been more supervised by the authorities, which are attentive to public interests. They can, for example, restrict free management of people's goods, due to immaturity, ill or insanity, or scrupulously apply the prohibition of usury. Opposed like Francisco de Vitoria to any contractual consensualism, Soto was criticized by Leonardus Lessius and Luis de Molina.

Like his teacher Francisco de Vitoria, Soto helped to provide a modern insight to the Spanish conquests in the New World, helping to build the concept of people's rights, including the right to private property of the native Americans.

Soto is also famous for having defended the rights of the legitimate poor, based on natural law, against imperial and urban policies restricting access to poor relief and secularizing charities, as advocated by Juan Luis Vives. For him, the rich and the poor are bound in a symbiotic relation of mutual necessity, inasmuch as the second need the material support of the first to survive but the first need also the second to apply charity and get the salvation of their souls.

== Works ==
- Summulae, 1529. (A manual of logic.)
- De ratione tegendi et detegendi secretum, 1541
- In dialecticam Aristotelis commentarii, 1544
- In VIII libros physicorum, 1545 (An influential commentary on Aristotle's Physics.)
- Deliberacion en la causa de los pobres, 1545
- De natura et gratia libri III, 1547 (A treatise on original sin and grace, written from a Thomistic point of view.)
- Comment. in Ep. ad Romanos, 1550
- In IV sent. libros comment. 1555-6.
- De iustitia et iure libri X, 1556 (A treatise on law.)
- Jaime Brufau Prats and Sixto Sanchez-Lauro, eds. Domingo de Soto, OP., Relecciones y opúsculos (Salamanca, Editorial San Esteban, 2011).
