= Leonardus Lessius =

Brabant moral theologian (1554–1623)

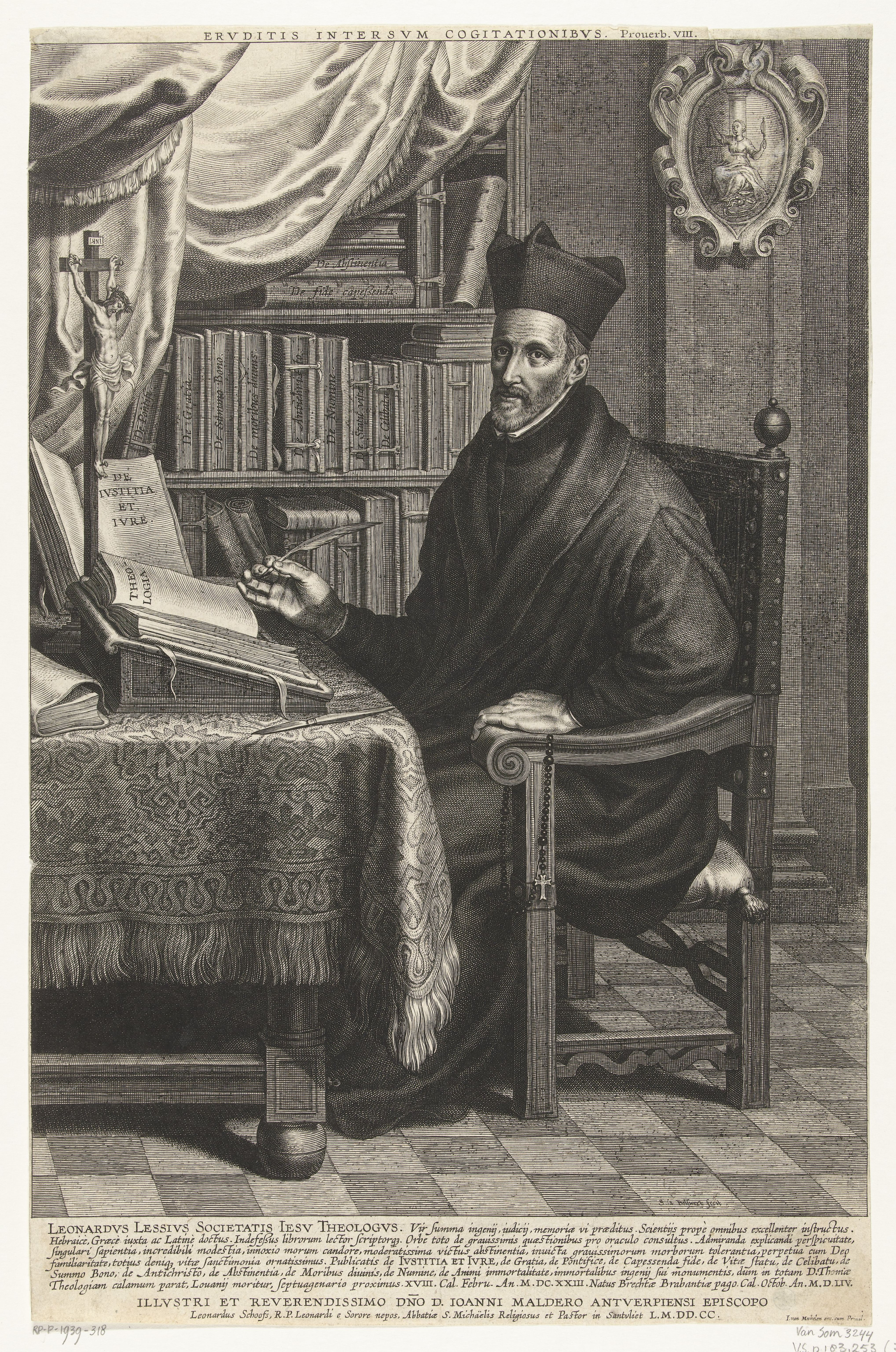
Leonardus Lessius

Lenaert Leys, better known as Leonardus Lessius (1 October 1554 in Brecht - 15 January 1623, in Leuven) was a Brabant jurist, theologian, economist from the Jesuit order.

Nicknamed the "oracle of the Low Countries", figurehead of the School of Salamanca, he was a great source of inspiration for later jurists like Grotius, Juan de Lugo or Pedro de Oñate.

== Life ==
Born to a farmer father, Lessius grew up in a family of four children of which he was the only boy. After primary studies in his village, his uncle encouraged him to continue his studies in the Atrechtcollege of Leuven. Receiving a scholarship, he studied after in the Pedagogie Het Varken , an arts department, where he was merited in 1572 the title of primus among all philosophy students.

The same year, instead of pursuing his studies in Law of Theologye at the university of Leuven, het decided to take orders in the Company of Jesus. After his novitiate in the Jesuit college of Saint-Omer in 1574, he taught philosophy in the college d'Anchin of Douai, where Robert Southwell was one of his students. Autodidact, he learned by himself ancient greek, biblical studies, patristic, theology, canon and civil laws.

After a year of study in Liège, he was sent in 1583 in the Roman College to pursue his theological learning under Robert Bellarmine and Francisco Suarez, who thought him the renewal of scholastic by the School of Salamanca. He met also Maffeo Barberini, future pope Urban VIII.

Back in Leuven in 1585, he became teacher of theology in the Jesuit college of Leuven, where he was involved in the predestination theological debate that was raging in Leuven in 1587–88 against Baianism. Despite significant persecution and censorship that he received as a result, Lessius supported the view of free will and predestination developed by Luis de Molina, which was seen by many theologians at the time as too little conservative position.

He pursued his academic career until 1600, when due to illness he was released from his teaching tasks. Then he used his time to inspects colleges of the Jesuit order with Olivier Mannaerts and to write his doctrinal opus.

== Work ==
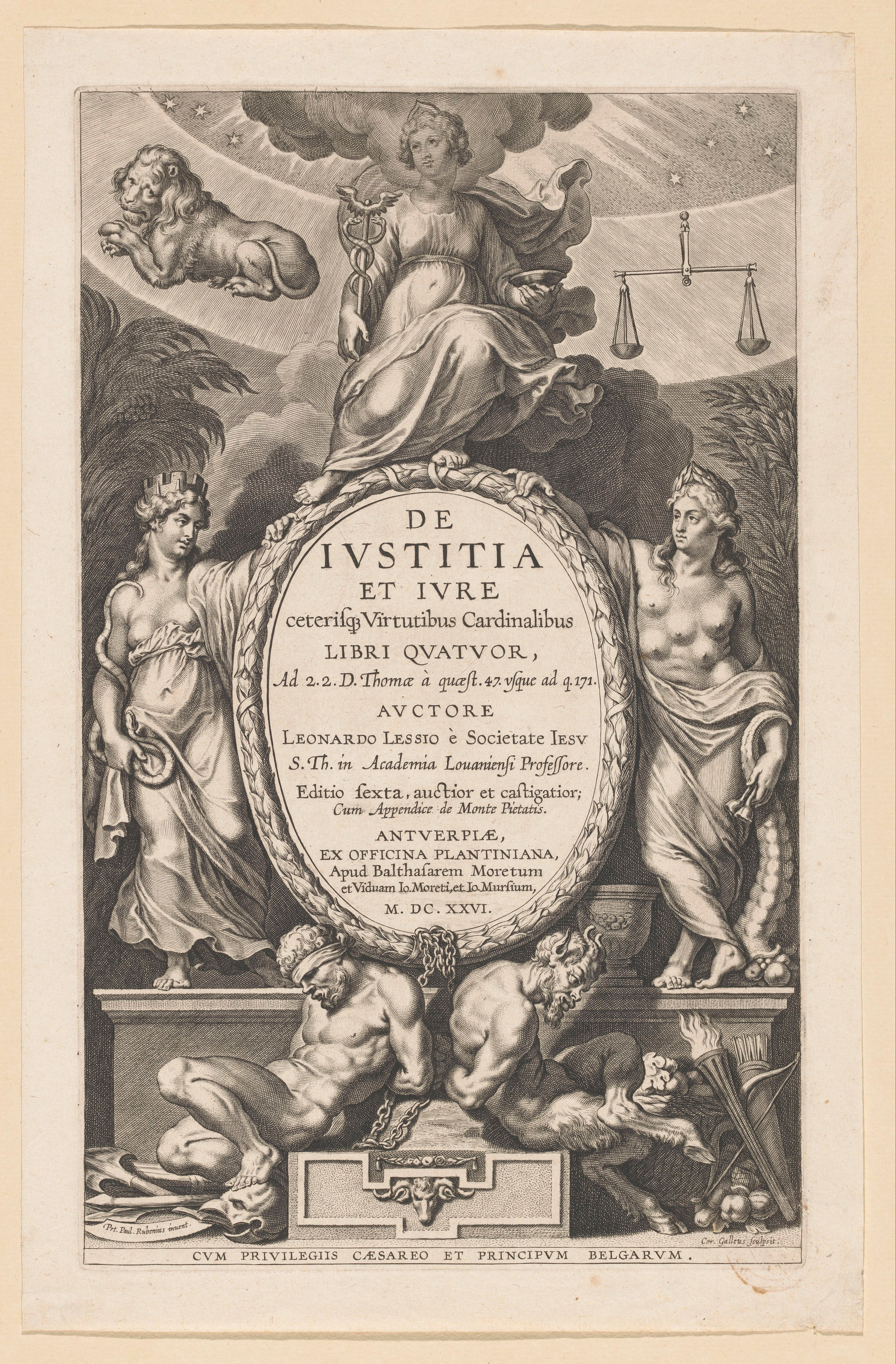
Leonard Lessius, De justitia et jure, Antwerp: ex officina Plantiniana, B. Moretus, 1626.

=== Contract law ===
Following the path of Domingo de Soto in the systematisation of law, Lessius played a great role in the development of obligation and contract law, and was one of the main reference of Grotius.

He systematised the concept vice of consent for error and made the contract voidable in aid of the intimidated party, putting an end to the roman distinction stricti iuris contracts and bonae fidei contracts. He also possible, with Luis de Molina the distinction between contract law and testament law.

Fervent supporter of contractual consensualism, he conceded however the possibility for the authorities to restrain it in order to protect vulnerable population, guarantee public interest or assure salvation. He even formulated principles of contractual freedom, later reused and assumed by Pedro de Oñate. He also accepted the theory of improvision as a general principle of contract law.

Lessius renewed the concept of just price based on Thomas Aquinas' works, and perceived it like the other members of the School of Salamanca as a result of human estimation : it then depends on multiple factors like offer and demand, monetary market, type of transaction,...

=== Ethic and economic science ===
Recognized as a "master of economic analysis" for his reflexions, namely for his prefiguration of liquidity preference, Lessius was one of the most supportive thinkers about new merchant's practices, sometimes against traditional moral and theological thoughts. For example, he clearly stated the dependence of the price of an insurance contract on the risk of the event insured against, supported the establishment of mount of piety and the utilisation of contractum trinius.

Based on thomism, roman law and empirical observations on markets, he provided a lot of arguments in the defense of nascent capitalism.

In the same way, he was also interested in reflexions about ethical and deontological responsibilities of counsellors and lawyers.

== Tomb ==
Lessius is buried in St. Michael Church, the historic Jesuit church in Leuven. His simple tomb is located in the baptistry, just to the north of the apse. Previously, he was interred at the nearby Jesuit college.

== Works ==
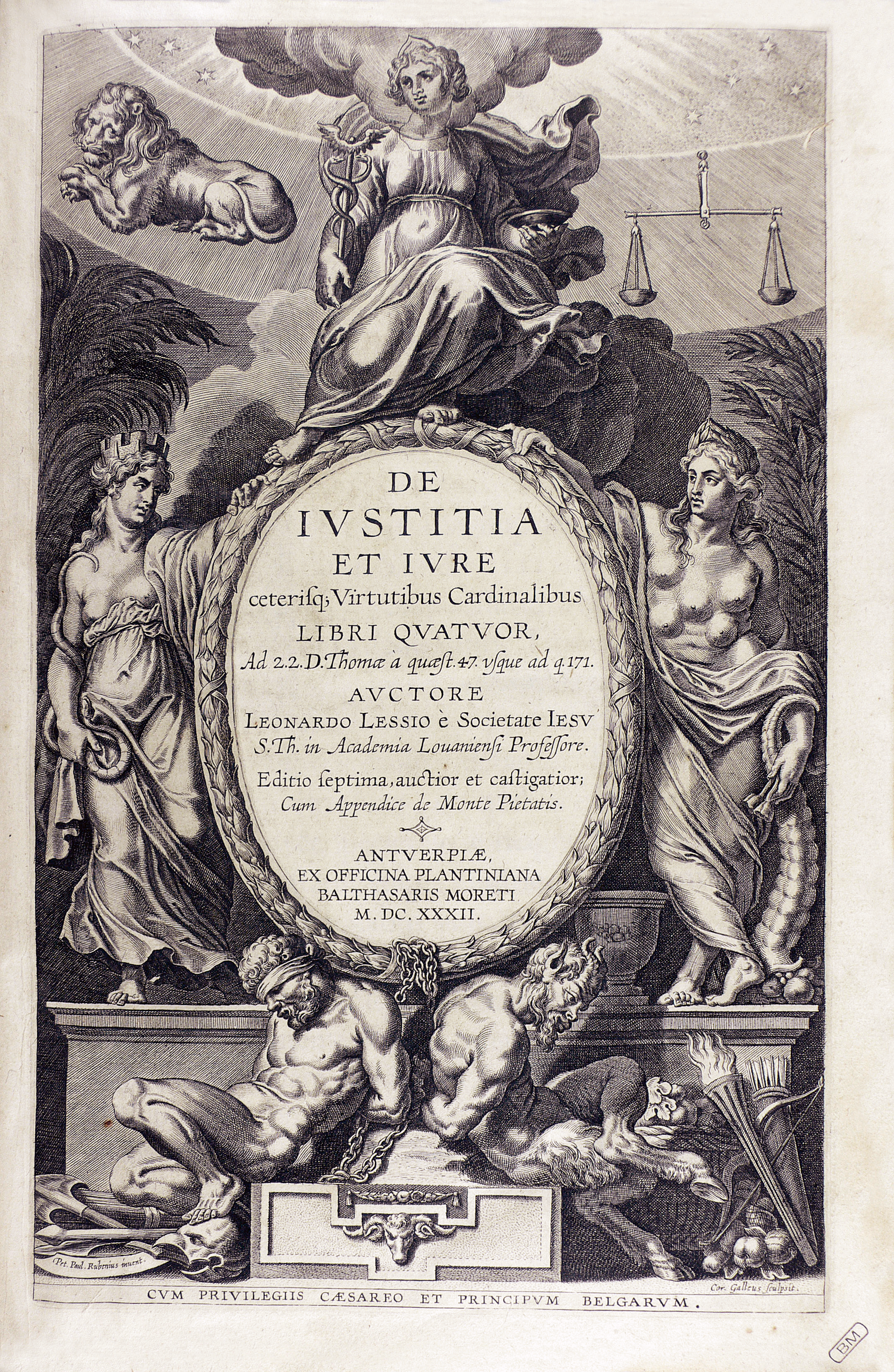
De iustitia et iure, 1632 (Mansutti Foundation).

- De Iustitia et Iure, Lovania, 1605. The first full English translation of the sections in this work on sales, legal securities, and insurance was recently published by Christian's Library Press as On Sales, Securities, and Insurance (2016)
- De Bono Statu eorum qui vovent..., Colonia, 1615.
- De perfectionibus moribusque divinis, Amberes, 1620.

== See also ==
- Congregatio de Auxiliis
