= India Quarterly =

- Discipline: Political science
- Language: English
- Edited by: Vijay Thakur Singh

Publication details
- History: 1954
- Publisher: Sage Publications India Pvt Ltd
- Frequency: Quarterly
- Impact factor: 0.6

Standard abbreviations
- ISO 4: India Q.

Indexing
- ISSN: 0974-9284 (print); 0975-2684 (web)

Links
- Journal homepage; Online access; Online archive

India Quarterly is a peer-reviewed journal published quarterly by Sage in association with Indian Council of World Affairs.

This journal is a member of the Committee on Publication Ethics (COPE). It is edited by Vijay Thakur Singh.

== Abstracting and indexing ==
India Quarterly is abstracted and indexed in:

- Research Papers in Economics
- DeepDyve
- Portico
- Dutch-KB
- OCLC
- ICI
- EBSCO: Australia/New Zealand Reference Centre
- ProQuest: Worldwide Political Science Abstracts
- ProQuest: Political Affairs Information Service
- Scopus
- J-Gate
- Ohio
- UGC Care
- Clarivate Analytics: Emerging Sources Citation Index (ESCI)
