= Millennial Asia =

- Discipline: Economics Development Studies
- Language: English
- Edited by: Lakhwinder Singh and Sukhpal Singh

Publication details
- History: April 2010
- Publisher: SAGE Publications
- Frequency: Tri-annually

Standard abbreviations
- ISO 4: Millenn. Asia

Indexing
- ISSN: 0976-3996 (print); 2321-7081 (web)

Links
- Journal homepage; Online access; Online archive

The Millennial Asia is a multidisciplinary, refereed academic journal the provides a platform for discussion on multifaceted, multidisciplinary and interdisciplinary research on Asia, in order to understand its fast changing context as a growth pole of global economy.

The journal is published thrice a year by SAGE Publications (New Delhi) in collaboration with Association of Asia Scholars.

This journal is a member of the Committee on Publication Ethics (COPE).

== Abstracting and indexing ==
Millennial Asia: An International Journal of Asian Studies is abstracted and indexed in:

- Bibliography of Asian Studies (BAS)
- Clarivate Analytics: Emerging Sources Citation Index (ESCI)
- DeepDyve
- Dutch-KB
- EconLit
- Indian Citation Index (ICI)
- J-Gate
- OCLC
- Ohio
- Portico
- ProQuest: Sociological Abstracts
- ProQuest: Worldwide Political Science Abstracts
- Research Papers in Economics (RePEc)
- SCOPUS
- UGC-CARE (GROUP II)
