= Journal of Human Values =

- Discipline: [Management]
- Language: English

Publication details
- History: 1995-present
- Publisher: SAGE Publications
- Frequency: Tri-annual

Standard abbreviations
- ISO 4: J. Hum. Values

Indexing
- ISSN: 0971-6858 (print); 0973-0737 (web)
- OCLC no.: 300298033

Links
- Journal homepage; Online access; Online archive

The Journal of Human Values is a Peer-reviewed academic journal published by SAGE publications. The journal publishes articles exploring the relevance of human values, human values at the organizational level, and the culture-specificity of human values. In addition to articles, the Journal of Human Values publishes book reviews.

== Abstracting and indexing ==
Journal of Human Values is abstracted and indexed in:

- SCOPUS
- DeepDyve
- Portico
- Dutch-KB
- EBSCO
- OCLC
- Ohio
- ICI
- Global Institute for Scientific Information
- ProQuest Technical Information
- J-Gate
- Thomson Reuters: Emerging Sources Citation Index (ESCI)
