= Social Change (journal) =

- Discipline: Social Science
- Language: English
- Edited by: Riaz Ahmad [Editor] Anakshi Pal [Managing Editor] Susmita Mitra [Book Review Editor] Gurmeet Kaur [Assistant Editor]

Publication details
- History: 1971–present
- Publisher: SAGE Publications (India)
- Frequency: Quarterly

Standard abbreviations
- ISO 4: Soc. Change

Indexing
- ISSN: 0049-0857 (print); 0976-3538 (web)
- LCCN: 72921675
- OCLC no.: 1608049

Links
- Journal homepage; June 2024 Special Issue; Online Archive

Social Change is a peer-reviewed quarterly journal that provides a forum for discussion in the field of social change and development, in as non-technical language as possible.

It is published quarterly in association with the Council for Social Development by SAGE Publications.

== Abstracting and indexing ==
Social Change is abstracted and indexed in:

- DeepDyve
- Dutch-KB
- EBSCO
- J-Gate
- OCLC
- ICI
- Portico
- ProQuest: Worldwide Political Science Abstracts
- ProQuest: Sociological Abstracts
- SCOPUS
