= Spain in the 17th century =

Habsburg Spain was at the height of its power and cultural influence at the beginning of the 17th century, but military, political, and economic difficulties were already being discussed within Spain. In the coming decades these difficulties grew and saw France gradually taking Spain's place as Europe's leading power through the later half of the century. Many different factors, including the decentralized political nature of Spain, inefficient taxation, a succession of weak kings, power struggles in the Spanish court and a tendency to focus on the American colonies instead of Spain's domestic economy, all contributed to the decline of the Habsburg rule of Spain.

The end of the century also brought the end of Habsburg rule. The 18th century began with the War of the Spanish Succession, which concluded in the establishment of the Bourbon dynasty in Spain.

== Background: Spain from 1469 to the reign of Philip II of Spain ==
In 1469, Ferdinand II of Aragon and Isabella I of Castile united the Crowns of Aragon and Castile into one, creating the early modern Spanish state. Although this ensured future Spanish rulers would rule over both Aragon and Castile, both regions had their own administration and legal systems. In addition, Aragon itself was divided into Aragon proper, Valencia, and Catalonia - each with its own institutions, customs, and regional identity. As Ferdinand and Isabella both outlived their only son to survive infancy, they were succeeded by their grandson, Charles V, Holy Roman Emperor upon Ferdinand's death in 1516. Being Flemish born and not a native Spanish speaker, Charles never completely assimilated into Spanish society and as Holy Roman Emperor, had to rule over two empires at once. Determining it to be too difficult for one person to rule over all of his domains, Charles gave the Holy Roman Empire to his younger brother Ferdinand I and the Spanish Empire to son, Philip II.

Although the Spanish Empire was at the height of its power under Philip II, a number of factors foreshadowed its eventual, gradual decline. There was a revolt in the Netherlands which started in 1568 and lasted the rest of Philip's reign. Also, the moriscos in Andalusia rebelled in 1570 against Philip's imposition of Spanish language and customs on them. Philip was at war with the Dutch republic, France and England during the last 10 years of his reign. These and other wars and difficulties in maintaining the vast Spanish Empire led to four bankruptcies during Philip's reign.

== Reign of Philip III of Spain (1598–1621) ==
— Signs that Habsburg Spain was declining became visible during the reign of Philip III. Throughout Philip III's reign the main currency was a copper-based coin called vellon, which was minted in response to the fall in imports of silver. Ironically, the copper needed to make vellon was purchased in Amsterdam with silver. Imports of silver bullion from the Americas fell by half during Philip III's reign. In 1599, a year after Philip took the throne, a bubonic plague killed about half a million people (1/10 of the Spanish population at the time).

== Reign of Philip IV of Spain (1621–1665) ==
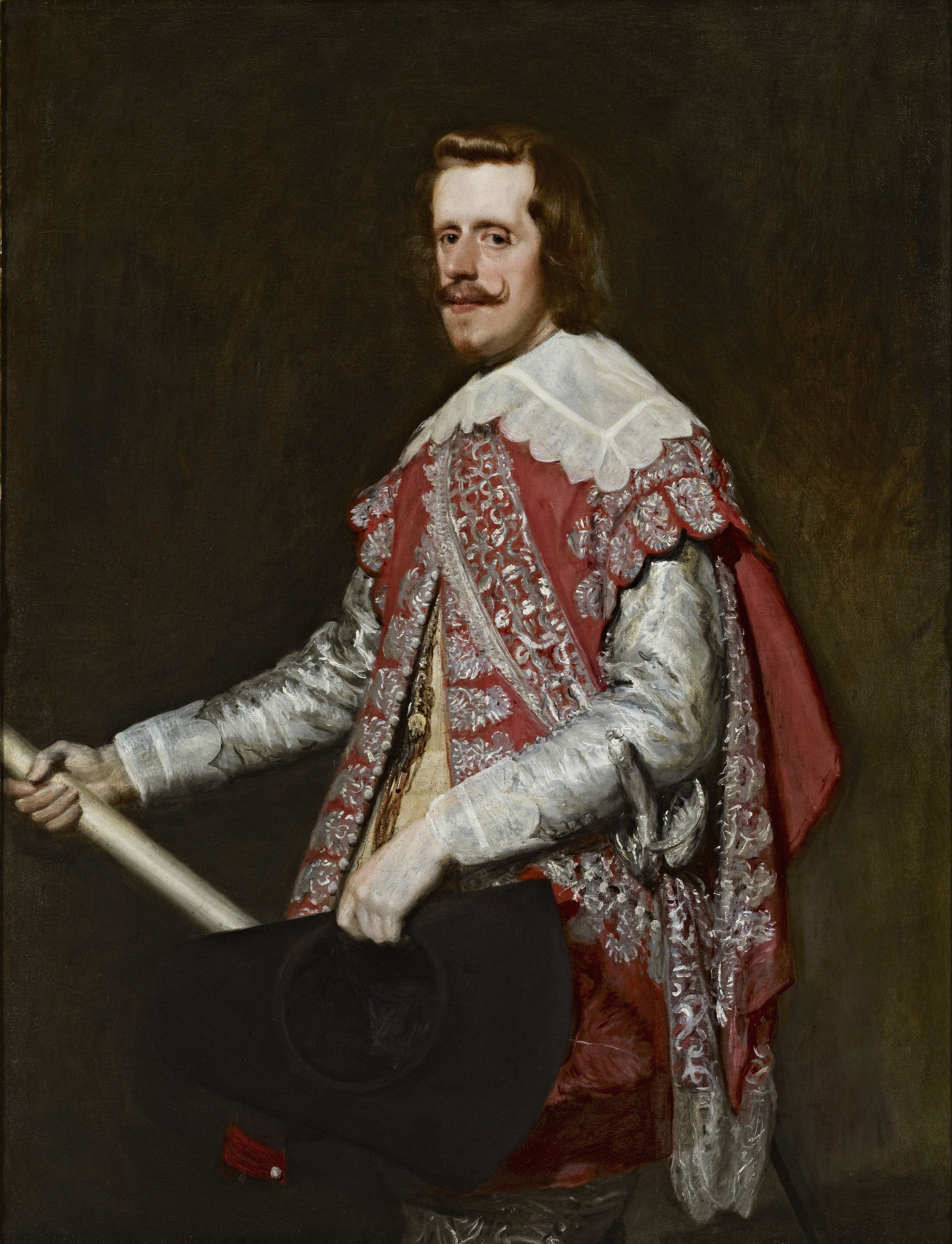
Philip IV of Spain

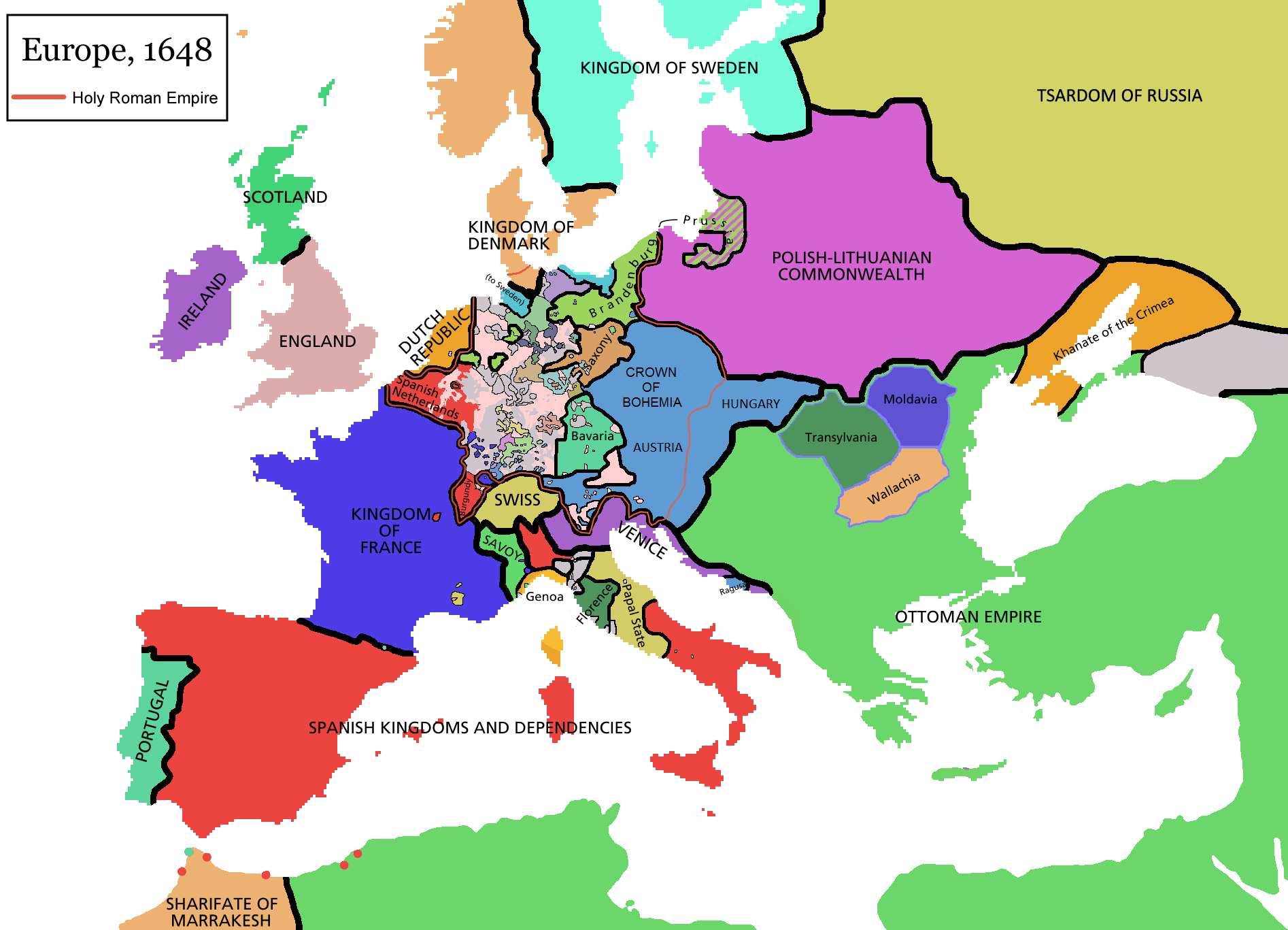
Europe after the Peace of Westphalia, 1648

Philip IV's father passed on a kingdom in decline already. Philip IV of Spain was not competent enough to give the kind of clear direction that Spain needed. Responsibility passed to aristocratic advisers. Gaspar de Guzmán, count-duke of Olivares, attempted and failed to establish the centralized administration that his contemporary, Cardinal Richelieu, had introduced in France. Under the immense pressures of the Thirty Years' War, Olivares attempted to bureaucratically centralise administration and to extract further taxes via the Union of Arms. Catalonia revolted and was virtually annexed by France. Portugal reasserted its independence in 1640, with the Restoration War sparked by John IV of Portugal, a Braganza claimant to the Spanish throne. An attempt was made to separate Andalusia from Spain. Spanish forces recovered Naples and most of Catalonia from French control but Portugal was lost permanently. In 1648, at the Peace of Westphalia, Spain assented to the emperor's accommodation with the German Protestants, and in 1654 it recognized the independence of the northern Netherlands.

== Reign of Charles II of Spain (1665–1700) ==
During the long regency for Charles II, the last of the Spanish Habsburgs, validos milked Spain's treasury, and Spain's government operated principally as a dispenser of patronage. Plague, famine, floods, drought, and renewed war with France wasted the country. The Peace of the Pyrenees, in 1659, had ended fifty years of warfare with France which had achieved some minor territorial gains at the expense of the Spanish Crown. As part of the peace settlement, the Spanish infanta Maria Theresa had become the wife of Louis XIV. However, Louis XIV, found the temptation to exploit a weakened Spain too great. Using Spain's failure to pay her dowry as a pretext, Louis instigated the War of Devolution (1667–68) to acquire the Spanish Netherlands in lieu of the dowry. Most of the European powers were ultimately involved in the wars that Louis fought in the Netherlands.

== Spanish society during the 17th century ==
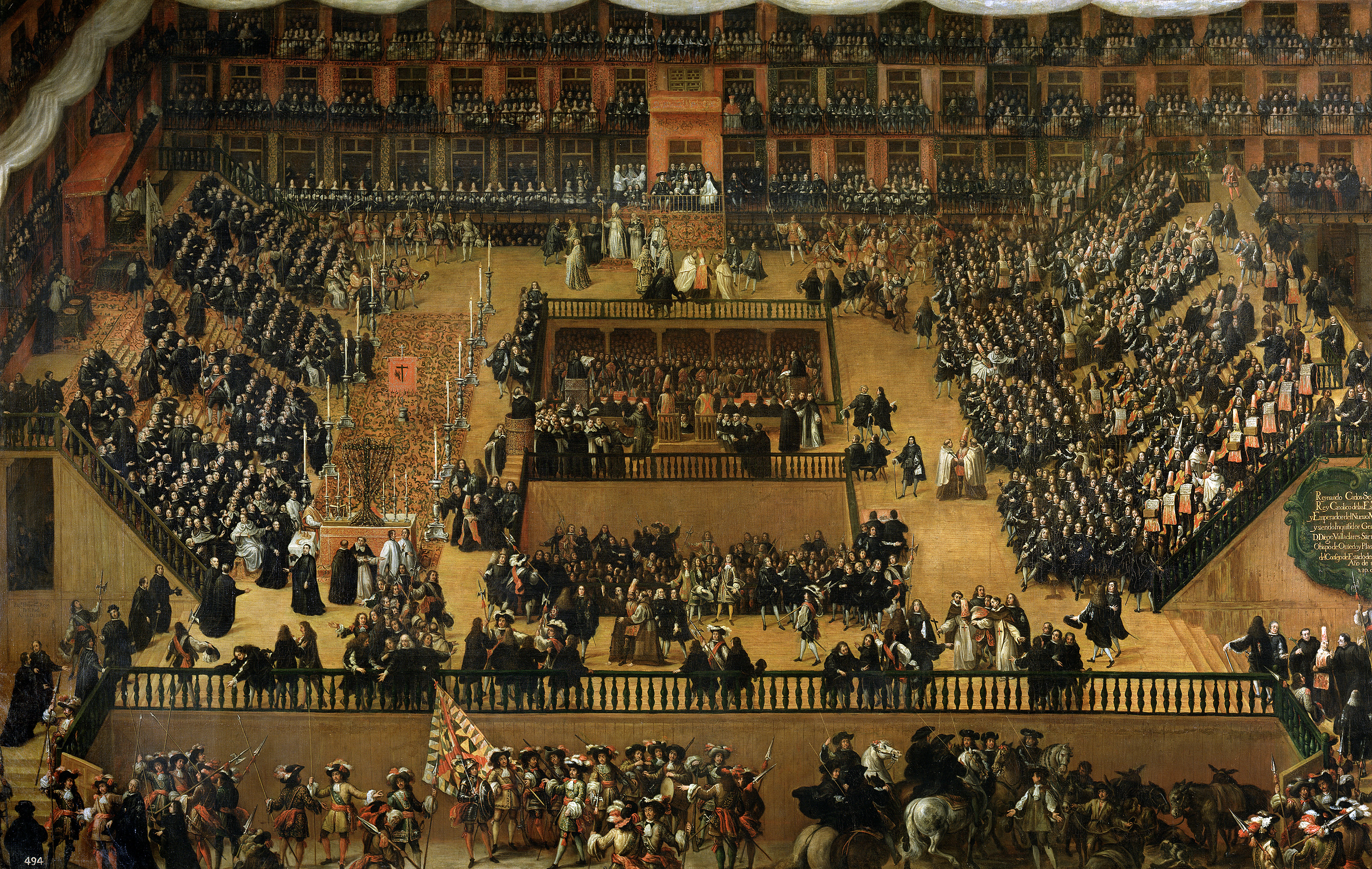
Spanish Inquisition's auto-da-fé held in the Plaza Mayor, Madrid in 1680

Spanish society in the 17th century Habsburg Spain was extremely inegalitarian. The nobility, being wealthier than ordinary people, also had the privilege of being exempt from taxes. Spanish society associated social status with leisure and thus work was undignified for nobles. Even wealthy merchants invested in land, titles, and juros. Two acceptable careers for the nobility were the church and education. In 1620, there were 100,000 Spaniards in the clergy, by the late 17th century there were 150,000. Many Spaniards spent long years in universities, taking advantage of the increase in its numbers. By 1660, there were about 200,000 Spaniards in the clergy and the Church owned 20% of all the land in Spain.

== Economic situation in Spain during the 17th century ==
Commentators in Spain known as arbitristas proposed a number of measures to reverse the decline of the Spanish economy but they had little effect. Aristocractic contempt for trade was reinforced by its association with conversos and moriscos who were distrusted by the Spanish general population because of their Jewish or Muslim background. More importantly, many arbitristas believed that the influx of silver from the American mines was the cause of inflation which hurt Spanish manufactures. A European price revolution was first fed by silver from central Europe, but then by that from the Spanish American mines. Spain's increasing dependence on resources from the New World over the last century reduced incentives to develop or stimulate domestic production and to create a more efficient tax bureaucracy. Instead, operating expenses were covered by borrowing funds, like the Asiento de Negros. This was unsustainable, and Spanish kings were forced to declare sovereign defaults nine times between 1557 and 1666. Another prominent internal factor was the Spanish economy's dependence on the export of luxurious Merino wool, the demand of which was replaced by cheaper textiles from England and the Netherlands. A reliance on revenue from resources obtained from the New World and Merino wool was not sustainable, and ultimately the economy stagnated.

== See also ==
- Great Plague of Seville
- Decline of Spain
