= Progress in Development Studies =

- Discipline: Development Studies
- Language: English
- Edited by: Prabir Bhattacharya

Publication details
- History: Jan 2007
- Publisher: SAGE Publications (India)
- Frequency: Quarterly

Standard abbreviations
- ISO 4: Prog. Dev. Stud.

Indexing
- ISSN: 1464-9934 (print); 1477-027X (web)

Links
- Journal homepage; Online access; Online archive

The Progress in Development Studies is a blind peer-reviewed academic journal that aims to serve as a forum for the discussion of development issues, including:

- Poverty alleviation and international aid
- The international debt crisis
- Economic development and industrialization
- Environmental degradation and sustainable development
- Political governance and civil society
- Gender relations
- The rights of the child

The journal is published four times a year by SAGE Publications, India with a view that development should be defined as change, whether positive or negative. This journal is a member of the Committee on Publication Ethics (COPE).

== Abstracting and indexing ==
Progress in Development Studies is abstracted and indexed in:

- Thomson Reuters Citation Index
- ProQuest: International Bibliography of the Social Sciences (IBSS)
- Social Sciences Citation Index (Web of Science)
- SCOPUS
- Research Papers in Economics (RePEc)
- DeepDyve
- Portico
- Dutch-KB
- Pro-Quest-RSP
- EBSCO
- OCLC
- Ohio
- ICI
- ProQuest-Illustrata
- Australian Business Deans Council
- ProQuest: Bioscience Library
- J-Gate
