= History of science and technology in Spain =

Overview of science and technology in Spain

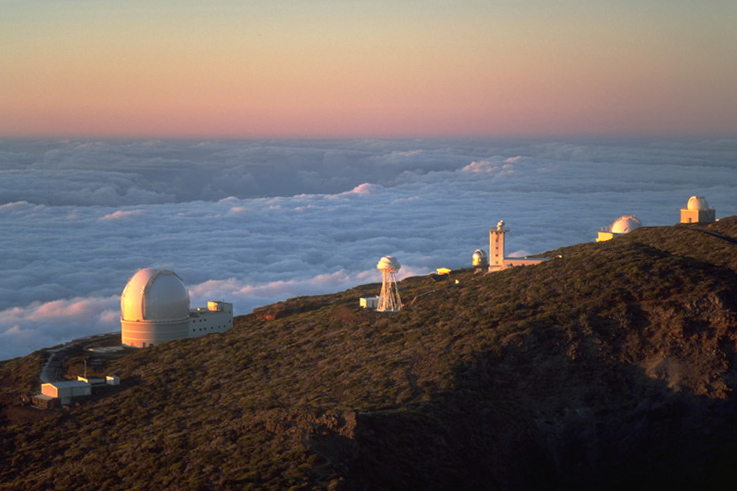
From left to right, the Herschel Telescope, the Dutch Open, the Carlsberg Meridian Telescope, the Swedish Solar Telescope, the Isaac Newton Telescope (second on the right) and the Jacobus Kapteyn Telescope (furthest on the right), in the Observatorio del Roque de los Muchachos, Isla de la Palma, Instituto de Astrofísica de Canarias.

The presence of science and technology in Spain dates back to Spain's prehistoric period. It is taken to include firstly an account of the historical development of these fields of study, and secondly a description of the current institutional and regulatory framework for continuing this development into the future.

== History ==
The scope of Spain's history with science and technology generally overlaps with the history of science and the history of technology of human history, particularly in Europe. Classifying the degree of scientific, technical or technological notability of certain movements or inventions are established by the established discipline of studies in Science, Technology and Society (STS). Whilst scientific and technical activities are as old as the human race, instances of integrating systematic knowledge, material resources, skills and technical procedures to transform a production process through the application of a defined methodology surfaced at the start the late modern period; in the case of Spain, this came tragically late, in contrast to the verve with which she had become one of the first to enter the early modern period. Few Spanish scientists (excepting those such as Servet, Cajal or Ochoa) were instrumental in the paradigm shifts characteristic of successive scientific revolutions. As a consequence, in Spain the study of the history of science concerns itself mainly with the effects these paradigms had on reaching Spain, and the same is true of technology transfers. Science and technology in Spain, in the 19th century until the beginning of the 20th century, was such a "marginal feature of its administrative and social structures", that this very marginality came to be used as a sort of Spanish national stereotype, spread and celebrated by some foreign media, rejected as being pejorative or belittling but on occasion seized on with haughty pride, as in Miguel de Unamuno's immortal phrase, repeatedly used and abused ever since, on both sides of the argument, to the extent of becoming a literary motif or cliché:

¡Que inventen ellos! (Let them invent!)

— Miguel de Unamuno, various versions, 1906–1912

=== Prehistory ===
Given the absence of written sources, the reconstruction of aspects of pre-scientific and pre-technological thought has been attempted through analysis and interpretation of Paleolithic art – of which the Iberian peninsula possesses examples of exceptional value; through studies of stone-working techniques; and through anatomical reconstructions. James Frazer in The Golden Bough proposed similarities between the function of science and that of magic in primitive cultures and in the "primitive mind". More recently André Leroi-Gourhan studied the topic from a structuralist perspective. The identification of "phases" through which human thought has passed in interpreting nature originate with the positivism of Auguste Comte – theological or fictive state; metaphysical or abstract state; and scientific or positivist state. Many other terms have been proposed: magical thinking, pre-philosophical thought, mythopoeic thought and others.

The pre-Neanderthal (Homo Heidelbergensis) finds at the Atapuerca site near Burgos in Spain offer one of the most promising directions for paleoanthropological research: to establish the degree of oral communication in that species by reconstruction of the sound-producing mechanism (hyoid) and hearing apparatus (bone structure and inner-ear cavity). This could be linked with other findings from the site, such as the deliberate accumulation of corpses. All this would necessitate consideration of the capacity for symbolic thought.

The theory of the "Neolithic Revolution" implies a diffusionist interpretation of the spread of innovations such as agriculture and pottery. On the other hand, it is argued that copper working at Los Millares (near Almería in Spain) during the Chalcolithic period (beginning of the third millennium BC) could have arisen independently, together with an increase in agricultural yields due to irrigation as seen at the Cerro de la Virgen de Orce site, as well as walled settlements and social stratification.

During the first civilisations in the Middle East, the part played by the "Far Western" regions in long-distance metal trading was vital for the development there of Bronze Age metallurgical techniques. Next, around 1000BC, Iron Age metallurgy was introduced simultaneously but independently to Iberia by Mediterranean colonisers (Greek and Phoenician) on the southern and eastern coasts, and by Celts from Central Europe in the centre, west and north. Less is known of the introduction of other technologies such as the wheel, the plough and the sail.

=== The Roman Period ===
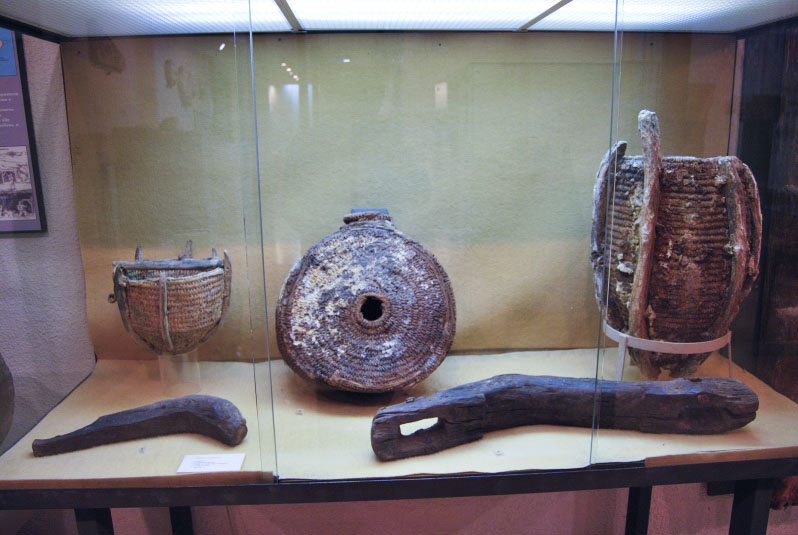
Esparto grass artefacts from the Roman mine workings at Carthago Nova (Cartagena). Museo Arqueológico Municipal de Cartagena.

Romanisation proliferated throughout Hispania, as shown in the construction techniques that gave rise to such completed structures as the Alcántara bridge or the Aqueduct of Segovia; a complex network of roads; the first dams for water storage (although whether these are in fact Roman is still under debate); or different types of mining ranging from large-scale gold mines such as that at las Médulas to the extraction of lapis specularis.

Some of the most important scientists of the Hellenistic period came to Cádiz, such as Polybius, Artemidorus and Posidonius, who took the chance while there to make measurements of the tides (more visible in the Atlantic than in the Mediterranean) and suggest their causes.

Among the few still surviving Hispano-Latin names that wrote scientific topics at that time are Pomponius Mela from Algeciras, and Columella from Cádiz, both from the Baetica province. The former wrote De Chorographia, a work of geography, and the latter wrote Res rustica and Liber de arboribus, on agronomy. The following quotation from Columela shows clearly how the speculative nature of Greco-Roman scientific activity was disconnected from technology and manual work, reflecting the basic separation between the "otium" (leisure time) fitting for philosophers, and the world of "negotium" (commerce) and slavery.

And I can never cease to wonder, when I consider how those who wish to speak well choose an orator whose eloquence they imitate; those who wish to learn the rules of calculation and measurement seek a master of this learning who pleases them so much; those who love music and dance take great care to find masters of these arts; those who want to construct a building call upon tradesmen and architects; those who wish to sail the sea seek men who know how to manage a boat; those who engage in war seek skilled tacticians; in short, everyone taking pains to find the best guide they can for that field of study to which they want to apply themselves...: only agriculture, which is certainly very close to wisdom, and has some sort of kinship with her, lacks pupils to learn it and masters to teach it.

— Lucio Junio Moderato Columela, Twelve books on agriculture, On rural matters (De re rustica), mid-1st century AD.

=== Medieval science ===
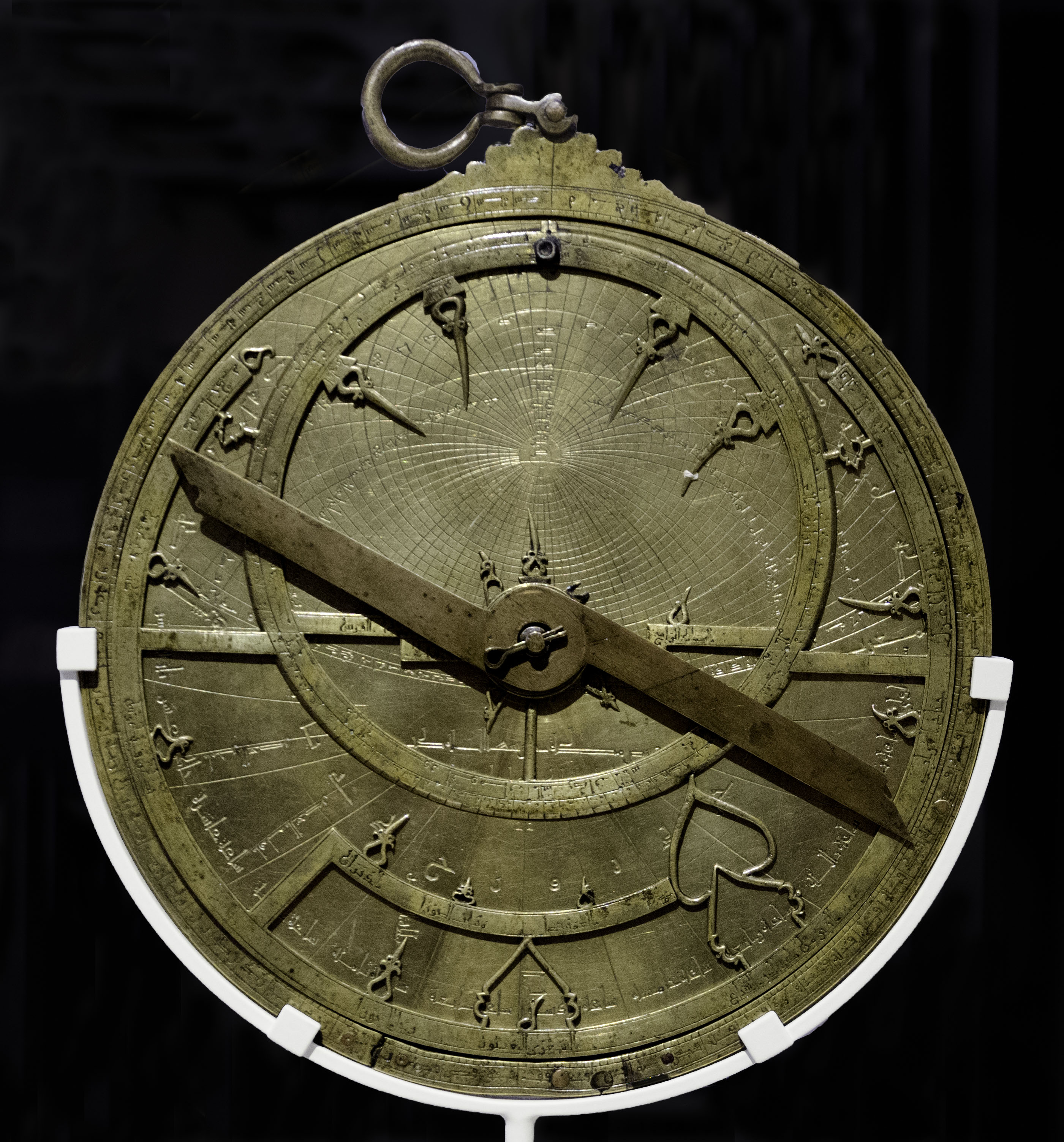
Astrolabe of al-Sahlî, constructed in Toledo in 1067. Museo Arqueológico Nacional.

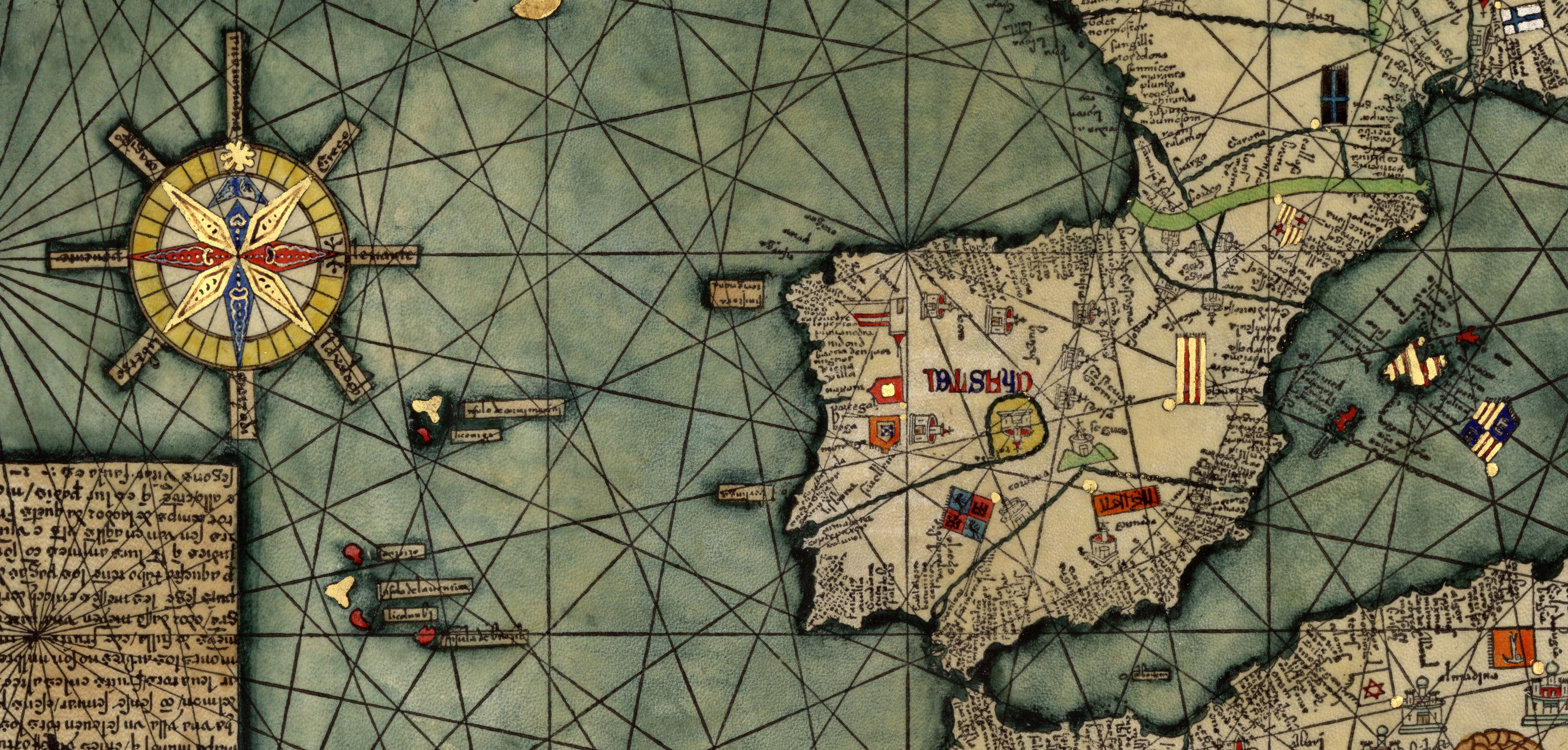
Excerpt from the Atlas catalán de Cresques Abraham, 1375

It was in the Iberian peninsula that medieval science saw some of its greatest developments. These were achieved under both Christian and Muslim rule, with an important Jewish contribution. Already during the "Dark Ages", some of the few scholars were located within the Visigothic kingdom of Toledo and Hispanic monasticism: in particular San Isidoro with his Etymologiae.

The transition from feudalism to capitalism implied technological changes driven forward or hindered by the different socio-economic structures, which in Spain were made manifest in the different forms of innovation in agriculture, livestock farming, food production and other crafts. In some cases these were promoted by institutions – monasteries or craft guilds; in other cases they arose from within the productive activities themselves, which to a greater or less extent kept their "trade secrets" and in the stratified society of the time were deprecated as "vile and mechanical trades". The most spectacular examples of the technology of this period are the water wheels of South-eastern Spain, together with other irrigation techniques introduced or perfected by the Arab-Hispanic civilisation.

The incorporation of the later medieval kingdoms of Spain into European trade routes between the Atlantic and the Mediterranean stimulated not only seafaring technology and the associated map-making and astronomical studies, but also the introduction of new commercial and financial institutions. Examples from the Kingdom of Aragón include trading halls (es:Lonja de la Seda), money-changing tables (Taula de canvi), and codes of law governing maritime trade (es:Consulado del mar); and from the Kingdom of Castile, trade fairs such as those of Medina del Campo, Medina de Rioseco and Villalón, where the first bills of exchange were drawn up.

=== Early modern science ===
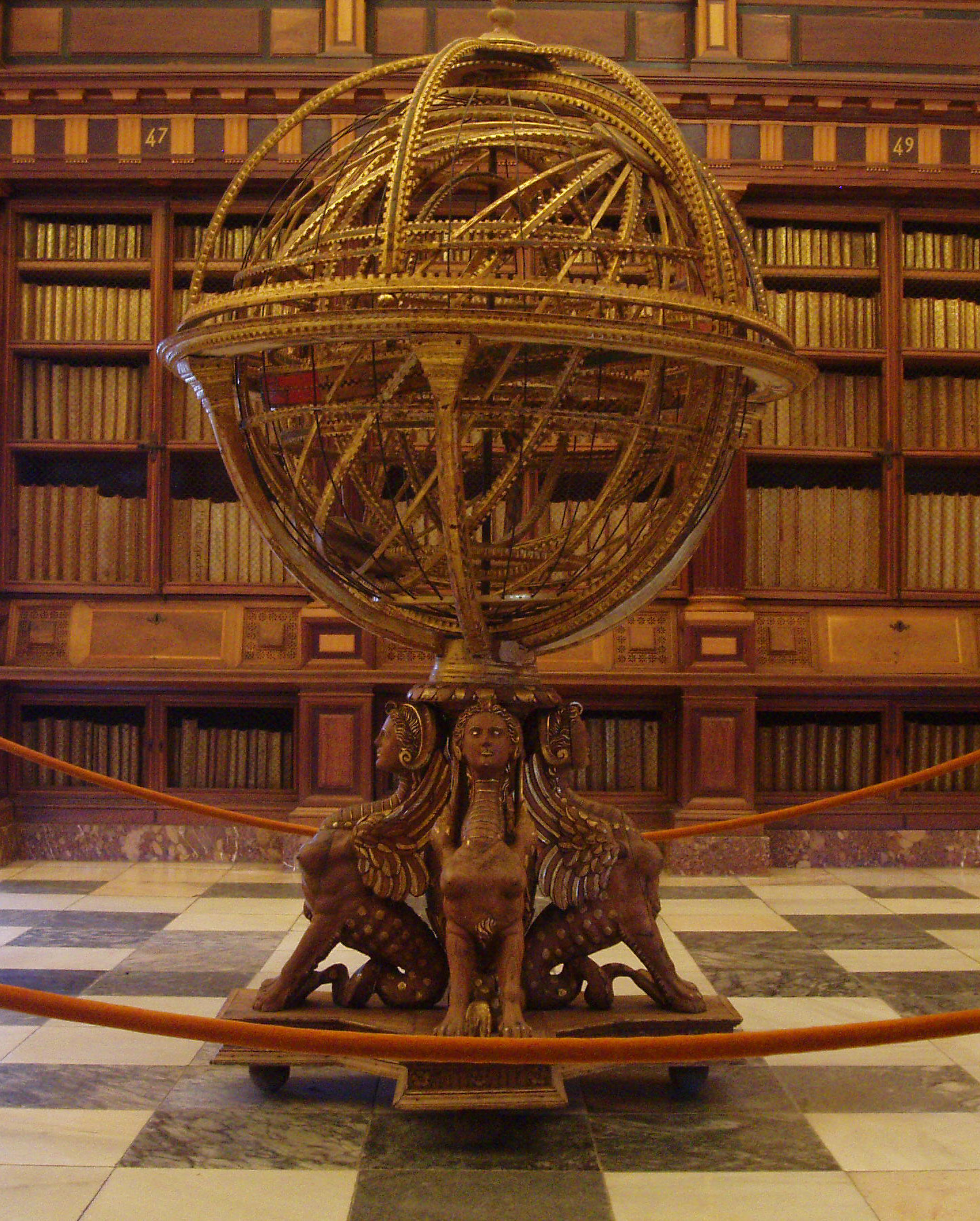
Armillary sphere, Library of El Escorial, 1582

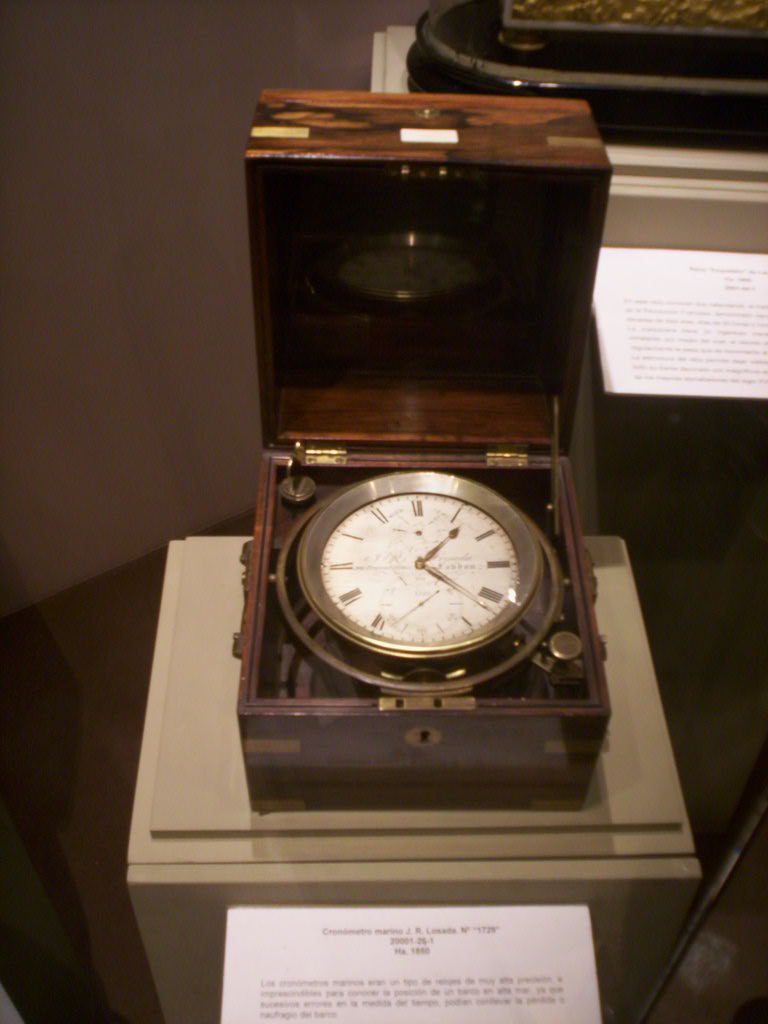
Marine chronometer, J. R. Losada, 1850–1860

The effects of the conquest of the Americas on Spain – in particular the negative effects of inflation, reduction in incentives for productive investment, and social and ideological conservatism – that led to the growth of Spanish economic science. One of its fundamental texts, by Tomás de Mercado, is titled Suma de tratos y contratos (On deals and contracts) (1571), paraphrasing the title of St Thomas Aquinas' work Summa theologica.

These trade practices were linked to the Jewish and converted Christian minorities. Lending at interest was considered as the sin of usury, both in Christian and Islamic morality. This lay at the root of some of the issues that determined the course of cultural and intellectual history, such as the dialectic between New and Old Christians, and the shaping of the financial and tax-collecting systems of the nascent authoritarian monarchy after its unification by the Catholic Monarchs. The "most religious" policy of this monarchy also justified a whole series of decisions with important consequences for production, science and technology in Spain. Among these were the expulsion of the Jews in 1492; the expulsion of the Moriscos (Christian converts from Islam, and their descendants) in 1609; the persecution of dissidents of all types – alumbrados, Protestants, followers of Erasmus; in addition to the subjection of conscience to the Inquisition, which universalised suspicion, denunciation and self-censorship.

The economic importance of the Spanish treasure fleet and the exploitation of minerals from the New World called for science and technology of the highest level, above all in the maritime and metallurgical fields. The clear priority for any conceivable "scientific programme" would have been to address the needs of the immense overseas empire.

A notable example of Spanish scientific aspirations at the time was in 1598, when Felipe III launched an open competition for a method of determining longitude at sea. In 1616 Galileo Galilei himself made an attempt at the attractive prize (with a method based on observing the movements of the moons of Jupiter). The ambition of this competition became evident from the fact that its goal did not prove achievable until the development of watches in the 18th century, when naval primacy was passing to England. From 1731 watches were available in England, such as that devised by John Harrison which relied on springs only, not pendulums or weights, and was kept in a box mounted in gimbals to absorb the movement of the ship. Meanwhile, Spanish watchmaking technology had fallen behind: despite royal sponsorship (es:Real Escuela de Relojería (1770), es:Real Fábrica de Relojes (1788–1793)), the royal collections of Carlos III and Carlos IV turned to the products of John Ellicott or of French watchmakers. This remained the case until the mid-19th century with the notable works of es:José Rodríguez Losada. In another field, but no less indicative of the future, was the chess contest staged by Felipe II in his court in 1575. On that occasion the Spanish master Ruy López de Segura, up to then considered the best practical and theoretical exponent of chess, was dethroned by the Italian Leonardo da Cutri.

While the medieval university renewed itself under the influence of humanism, the Counter-Reformation led to an isolation from outside influences and a general stagnation of the institution, which came to fulfil what had always been its main function: the reproduction of the élites (see es:Colegio Mayor). Nevertheless, we should not exaggerate some aspects of this closure to the exterior. Take for instance the infamous decree of 1559 forbidding Castilian students from attending universities outside the kingdom (in 1568 extended to students from Aragón); in practice this was applied with little rigour and its motivation is debated – it may have been not so much a defence against Protestantism as an attack on the Jesuits and on the University of Louvain, which was not excepted as were those of Bologna, Rome, Naples and Coimbra.

How pitiful and indeed shameful it is that, as if we were Indians, we should have to be the last to receive news and insights already spread throughout the rest of Europe. And likewise, that men who come to realise this take offence at the warning and fester in disappointment. And how certain it is that trying to diverge from the decree of an outdated opinion is among the hardest things that men attempt!

— Juan de Cabriada, "Philosophical-medical-chemical letter", 1687.

=== The Enlightenment ===
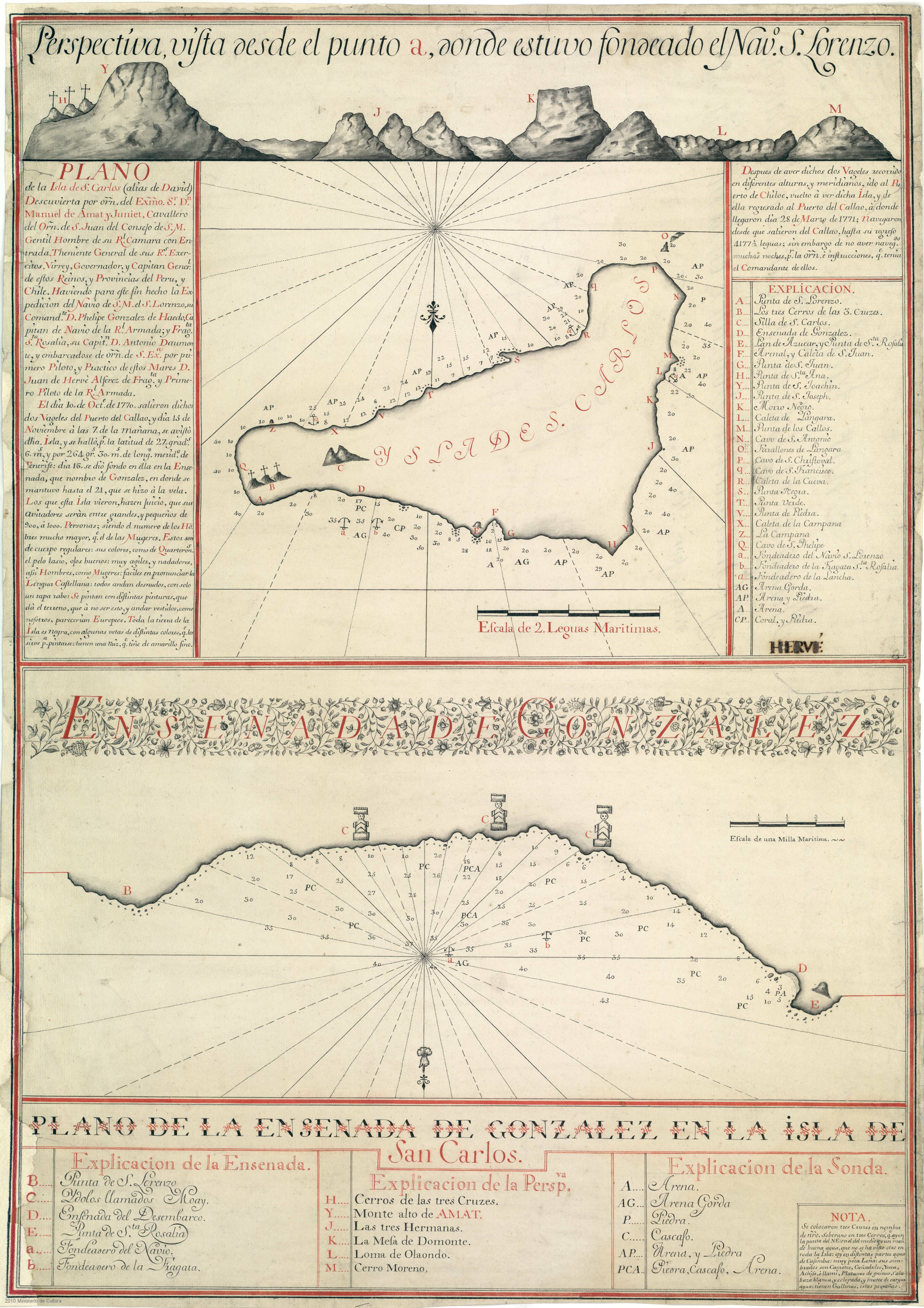
Map of Isla de San Carlos (Easter Island) compiled by the expedition of Felipe González Ahedo (1772). Museo Naval de Madrid.

Throughout the Age of Enlightenment, the awareness of the poor state of science and technology in Spain arose out of the "negative introspection" of the arbitristas of the 17th and especially the 18th century. In the "light of reason" these sought progress in applied science. Following the debate generated by Masson de Morvilliers' provocative question "What do we owe to Spain?" it became a commonplace that unlike literature and the arts, science in Spain considerably lagged behind that in other European countries. Indeed, this became such a prevalent cliché as to provoke a "complaint about the complaint" among writers such as Cadalso or Larra (Cartas marruecas, En este país).

In reality the field of "science" was not clearly distinguished from that of "letters" or "the humanities" until the Enlightenment; and even much later the width of the breach between the two fields of knowledge was not recognised, as witness the Two Cultures debate of the mid-20th century. It is in this context that we should view the famous speech of Don Quixote on "weapons and letters": while in the Middle Ages the knight may have distinguished himself mainly by his military adventures, from the Renaissance onward it became clear that high rank did not have to conflict with intellectual development.

"Letters" at this period embraced theology as well as humanities, which had recently emerged as independent disciplines: grammar, law, and what were called "liberal arts" including medicine (then known as "physic" and practised by "physicians"), the different branches of mathematics – among which astronomy was not yet distinguished from astrology -, and philosophy – not then distinct from what we would now term as "science", especially in the adjectival forms "natural philosophy" and "natural history" (both these terms later became obsolete in Spanish use).

Regardless of the adverse circumstances prevailing in the late 18th and early 19th centuries (es: crisis del Antiguo Régimen), the key to what was more and more coming to be perceived as "Spanish backwardness" was the survival of certain pre-industrial socio-economic structures, at the decisive moment when the Industrial Revolution began in England and the French Revolution occurred in France. This is also the crucial context in which, in the most advanced countries, science and technical progress began to be coordinated – up to then they had remained largely separate spheres. In time such coordination led to the emergence of "technology" in a full sense, and initiated feedback processes arising from the social need for innovation.

Resistance to modernisation in Spain was expressed in the strong antagonism between the Francophiles and their opponents the "casticistas", who accused the Francophiles of all sorts of religious heterodoxy – Jansenism, Freemasonry, pantheism, freethinking, Voltairianism, agnosticism, atheism – as exemplified in the trial of Pablo de Olavide. Paradoxically, those among the clergy who became victims of persecution were the most scientifically educated group: the Jesuits, who were expelled from Spain in 1767, having been blamed for the Esquilache Riots. Their schools and libraries were closed down and their members dispersed, although many of them based themselves in Rome and continued to publish scientific and literary works in Spanish. The Piarists became the order most engaged with teaching outside the university, although at a much more elementary level – the Jesuits focussed on the social and intellectual élite. The Society of Jesus was re-introduced to Spain during the 19th century, was again suppressed during the Second Republic and was restored under Franco. However, suspicion of science was not confined to Spain: in England and Holland at the end of the 17th and start of the 18th centuries there was strong medical opposition to the use of cinchona ("Jesuit powder").

=== 19th century ===
The Peninsular War, better known in Spain as the War for Spanish Independence, was truly a disaster for Spanish science and technology, which in some fields had achieved a leading position. Spanish science had contributed to the discovery of two – platinum and tungsten – of the 21 chemical elements identified in the 18th century and then to that of vanadium in 1801; but played no part in the discovery of another 50 elements during the rest of the 19th century. Of greater importance even than the systematic destruction of infrastructure by both French and British armies, such as the textile industry of Béjar or the porcelain manufacture of Buen Retiro in Madrid, was the "brain drain" resulting from the exiling in turn of Francophiles and Liberals. The closure of universities – whose reform, aimed at by proponents of the Enlightenment, had proved just as impossible as any other reform that threatened to disturb the structural underpinnings of the ancien régime – was offset only by the opening in 1830 of a bullfighting school in Seville headed by Pedro Romero.

At any rate, the gathering together of funds scattered during the sackings allowed the opening of the Prado Museum in Madrid, in the building originally intended as the base for the Royal Office for Science, the National Library, and other academic institutions. Gradually, the university sector was renewed: one major act was the move of the former University of Alcalá to Madrid as the Universidad Central. Primary and secondary education were developed as the foundation of a far-reaching educational programme (es:Ley Moyano), which however was not implemented effectively or widely until the Second Republic of 1931–1936.

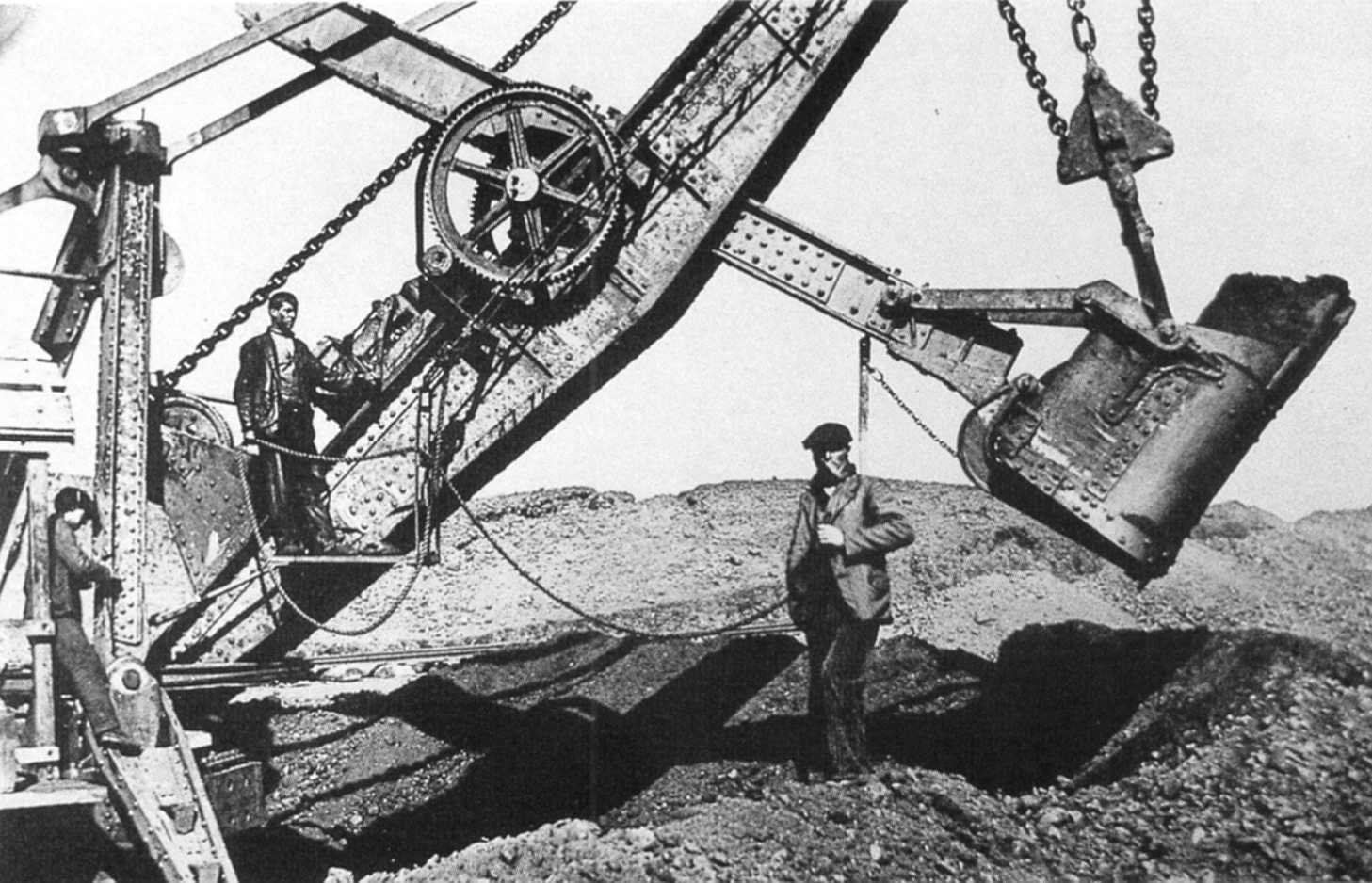
Machinery from the Rio Tinto mines, 1873

The economy of the 19th-century "liberal revolution" was hampered by the Carlist Wars and by the confiscation of church property. These factors severely held back an insecure process of industrialisation that had begun much earlier, as with textiles in Barcelona, or steel making in Málaga. The liberal programmes, especially those of the progresistas (in power 1854–1856 and 1868–1874), but also to a lesser extent of the moderados, included the promotion of railway-building and mining, opening Spain to foreign investment from France, Belgium and Britain. However, the protectionism of the end of the century meant closure of the economy to the outside world. Economic thinking during these periods reflected opposing demands: those of agrarian interests (the landowning oligarchy of Castile and Andalusia) and those of industrial interests (the bourgeoisie of the Catalan textile trade).

Awareness of having fallen behind was growing all the time, especially in the liberal élites, among whom were spreading strongly expressed slogans deriving from the Black Legend of the Spanish Inquisition.

If, overlooking those centuries during which the Arab civilisation made Spain the first country in the world as regards science, we focus only on the modern era, from the fifteenth century onward, you will well understand that this is not, and cannot be, the history of science in Spain, because a people without science can hardly have a scientific history. The flawed account you have heard is an historical summary of mathematical science, yes, but in Italy, France, England, Holland, Germany, Switzerland...; it is not the history of science here, where there was only the whip, iron, blood, prayers, braziers and smoke.

— José de Echegaray (1866), Speech on admission to the Spanish Royal Academy of Sciences

Such views were condemned in their turn as anti-Spanish propaganda, drawing on the studies of Julián Juderías. His 1914 work "The 'black legend' and historical truth" claimed that a wide range of Spanish scientists had been active during the Spanish Golden Age. His list can be found in a footnote to the Spanish Wikipedia article.

The "polemic of Spanish science", in which the reactionary thought of Menéndez and others was opposed by the "krausista" followers of the German philosopher Krause, developed following the restoration of the Bourbon monarchy in 1875. Later, as reaction to the disaster of the Spanish–American War of 1898, a "regenerationist" movement arose.

=== 20th century ===
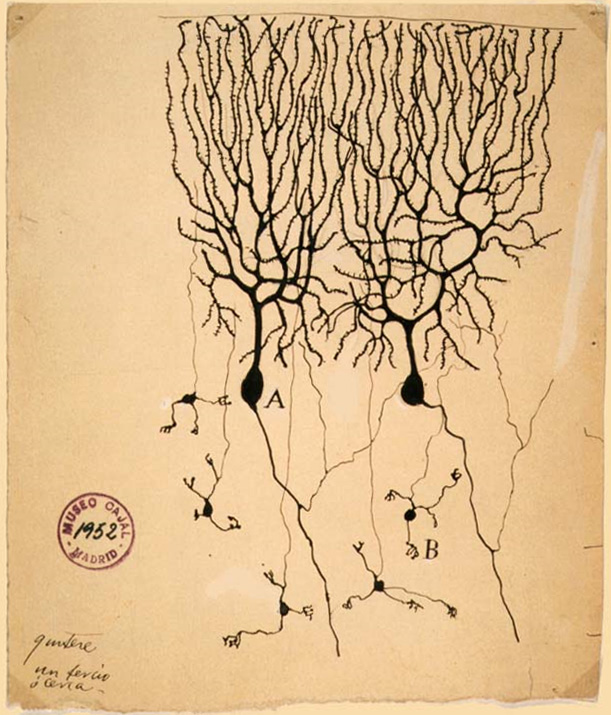
Purkinje cells in the cerebellum of a pigeon. Drawing by Ramón y Cajal, 1899.

The award of the Nobel Prize for Medicine in 1906 to the Spanish scientist Santiago Ramón y Cajal, at a time when Spanish science had in general little to be proud of, ushered in what became known as a "Silver Age" of Spanish letters and sciences during the first third of the twentieth century.

At present, when scientific research has become a recognised profession with State funding ... those former times have passed when anyone curious about Nature, shut in the silence of his study, could be sure that no rival would disturb his quiet musings. Nowadays, research is a fever: hardly is a new technique outlined, when many other scholars take it up and apply it almost simultaneously to the same problems, tarnishing the glory of the original inventor. ... In Spain, where laziness is not just a vice but a religion, people find it hard to grasp those monumental works of the German chemists, physicists and doctors, in which it would appear that just making the diagrams and searching the literature must take decades, and yet those books have been written within one or two years. ... The whole secret lies in the method of study ... in short, in not incurring the mental expense of that witty chat of the café and the social gathering, which takes away our nervous energy and with new and futile concerns distracts us from the main task.

— Santiago Ramón y Cajal (1897), Speech on admission to the Spanish Royal Academy of Sciences

The Spanish Civil War was another tragedy for Spanish science, bringing about the exile of a whole generation of scientists – the next Spaniard to win the Nobel Prize for medicine, Severo Ochoa in 1959, had taken American citizenship – and the moribund intellectual life in "internal exile" of many other scientists during the long poverty-stricken postwar period depicted in Luis Martín-Santos' novel Time of Silence (Tiempo de silencio). It was indicative of the National Catholicism of the time that one of the biggest scholarly projects was the Library of Christian Authors (1944). However, despite censorship, over time the publishing trade diversified and showed a great capacity for innovation, both technically and of content.

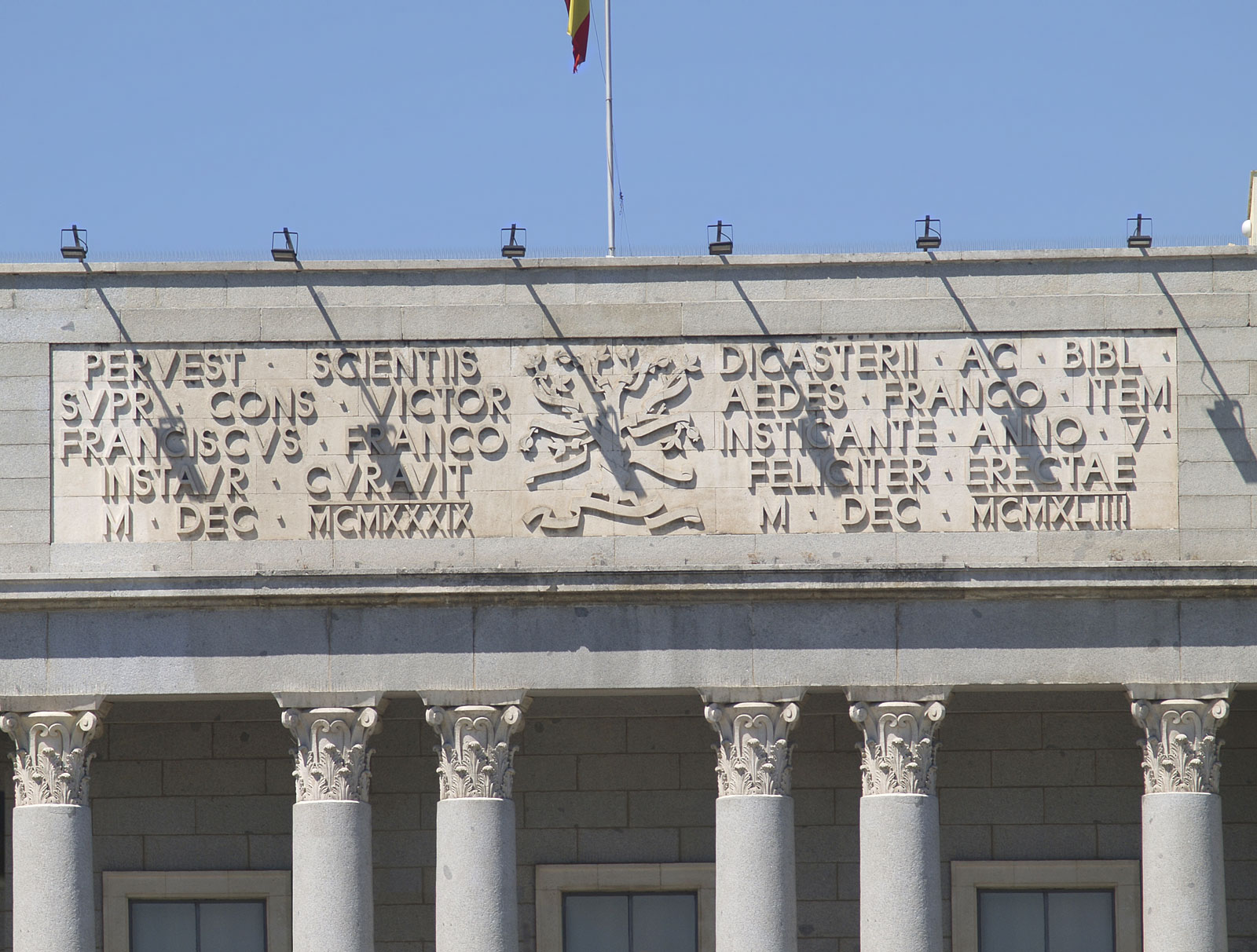
Headquarters of the CSIC, 2007

The policy of autarky, and the concentration of capital in large banking and industrial corporations, gave some opportunity for scientific and technological development in strategic sectors such as shipbuilding, petrochemicals and hydroelectricity. Later, in 1968, the first nuclear power station was built. Scientific work was centred in the universities – their leading departments deprived of the majority of their pre-war teachers and subject to the "brain drain" of the young – and in the Spanish National Research Council (Consejo Superior de Investigaciones Científicas, CSIC) which in 1939 had purged and taken over from a former research council of the krausista tradition.

We aim at a Catholic science. At this moment we therefore eliminate all the scientific heresies that dried up the channels of our national genius and sank us into lethargy and decay. ... Our present-day science, in common with that which defined us in past centuries as a nation and an empire, seeks to be above all Catholic

— José Ibáñez Martín, inaugural speech as President of the CSIC, October 1940.

Individual or collective achievements such as the Talgo train or the eradication of malaria were held up as glories of Francoist Spain, regardless of their importance – e.g., the heart transplant attempted by the Marquis of Villaverde, son-in-law to Franco himself, in September 1968, when the patient died the next day.

The development drive that got under way in the 1960s speeded up as regards scientific and technical achievement during the final quarter of the century, with the Spanish transition to democracy and the entry into the European Union. Spain was ranked 30th in the Global Innovation Index in 2020 and 2021, down from 29th in 2019.

== Regulatory framework ==
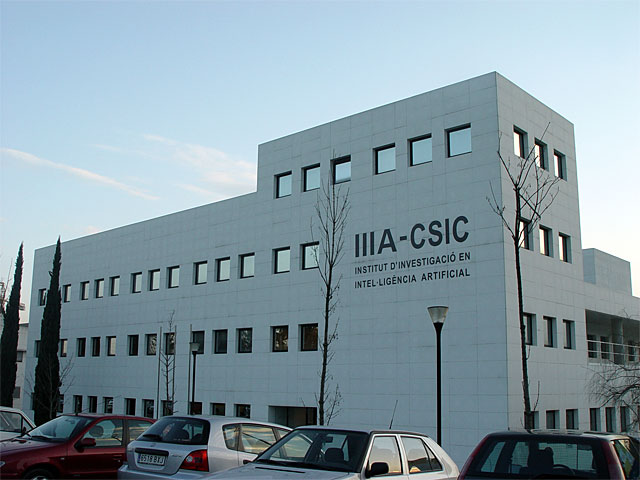
Instituto de Investigación en Inteligencia Artificial (Artificial Intelligence Research Institute), part of CSIC

Although faces a limited situation due to the deep budget cuts entailed by the Spanish financial crisis. One of the weaknesses of the Spanish system for science and technology (or national system for innovation) has been the lack of investment in R&D by private companies and their consequent dependence on public investment. In recent years Spain reached an impressive ninth in the rankings of world science (with 2.5% of publications), Two ministries currently share responsibility for this sector, the Ministry of Science and Innovation and the Ministry of Universities. There is a State Plan for Scientific and Technical Investigation and for Innovation, and a network of public research bodies (Organismos Públicos de Investigación, OPI), headed by the Spanish National Research Council (CSIC), with Major Science Facilities (Grandes Instalaciones Científicas, GIC), Medium Sized Facilities (Instalaciones de Tamaño Medio, ITM) and science and technology parks (Asociación de Parques Científicos y Tecnológicos de España, APTE).

Since the second decade of the 21st century, the departure of many private companies abroad, forced by the 2008–2013 crisis, has resulted in the need to compete and survive in the global market, especially in emerging markets, generating greater scientific application and technology, and consequently greater private investment in research.

== See also ==
- Open access in Spain
- ¡Que inventen ellos!
