= Global Journal of Emerging Market Economies =

- Discipline: Economics & Development Studies
- Language: English
- Edited by: Harinder Kohli

Publication details
- History: Jan 2009
- Publisher: Sage Publications India Pvt Ltd
- Frequency: Triannual

Standard abbreviations
- ISO 4: Glob. J. Emerg. Mark. Econ.

Indexing
- ISSN: 0974-9101 (print); 0975-2730 (web)

Links
- Journal homepage; Online access; Online archive

The Global Journal of Emerging Market Economies is a refereed academic journal published thrice a year in association with the Emerging Markets Forum, in Washington DC and publishes selected papers from their annual global meetings.

The journal is a member of the Committee on Publication Ethics (COPE).

== Abstracting and indexing ==
Global Journal of Emerging Market Economies is abstracted and indexed in:

- CABELLS Journalytics
- Dutch-KB
- EBSCO: EconLit
- Indian Citation Index (ICI)
- J-Gate
- Research Papers in Economics (RePEc)
- DeepDyve
- Portico
- OCLC
- ProQuest: Political Affairs Information Service
- SCOPUS
- UGC-CARE (GROUP II)
