= South Asian Journal of Business and Management Cases =

- Discipline: Business, management
- Language: English
- Edited by: GD Sardana

Publication details
- History: Jun 2012
- Publisher: SAGE Publications
- Frequency: Bi-annually

Standard abbreviations
- ISO 4: South Asian J. Bus. Manag. Cases

Indexing
- ISSN: 2277-9779 (print); 2321-0303 (web)

Links
- Journal homepage; Online access; Online archive

The South Asian Journal of Business and Management Cases is a peer-reviewed academic journal that provides a space for high quality original teaching cases, research or analytical cases, evidence-based case studies, comparative studies on industry sectors, products, and practical applications of management concepts.

The journal is published twice a year by SAGE Publications (New Delhi) in collaboration with Birla Institute of Management Technology

This journal is a member of the Committee on Publication Ethics (COPE).

== Abstracting and indexing ==
Journal of Creative Communications is abstracted and indexed in:

- DeepDyve
- Dutch-KB
- J-Gate
