= Science, Technology and Society =

Academic journal

- Discipline: Science and technology studies
- Language: English
- Edited by: V. V. Krishna

Publication details
- History: 1996
- Publisher: SAGE Publications (India)
- Frequency: Triannual
- Impact factor: 2.1 (2022)

Standard abbreviations
- ISO 4: Sci. Technol. Soc.

Indexing
- ISSN: 0971-7218 (print); 0973-0796 (web)
- OCLC no.: 607831980

Links
- Journal homepage; Online access; Online archive

Science, Technology & Society is a peer-reviewed journal. It provides a forum for discussion on how the advances in science and technology influence society and vice versa. It is published three times a year by SAGE Publications.

Science Technology & Society has been honoured with the Charles et Monique Moraze Award by Fondation Maison Des Sciences De l'homme.

This journal is a member of the Committee on Publication Ethics (COPE).

== Abstracting and indexing ==
Science, Technology and Society is abstracted and indexed in:

- Australian Business Deans Council
- CCC
- DeepDyve
- Dutch-KB
- EBSCO
- ICI
- J-Gate
- National Academy of Agricultural Sciences (NAAS)
- ProQuest: International Bibliography of the Social Sciences (IBSS)
- Pro-Quest-RSP
- SafetyLit
- SCOPUS
- Social Sciences Citation Index (Web of Science)

According to the Journal Citation Reports, the journal has a 2022 impact factor of 2.1, ranking it 198th out of 227 journals in the category "Management".
