= Open J-Gate =

Database of open access journals

Open J-Gate was a free database of open access journals, launched in February 2006, and hosted by Informatics Ltd. of India.

Informatics started metadata aggregation from open access journals as part of the development of J-Gate. Open J-Gate claimed to aggregate metadata from more than 4,000 open access journals published in the English language around the globe. Open J-Gate indexed articles from available e-journals in the open access domain, both from the scholarly and popular domains. It indexed peer-reviewed and non-peer reviewed professional magazines, as well as trade and industry journals.

== See also ==
- List of open-access journals
