= Decline of Spain =

Spanish historical period

The decline of Spain was the gradual process of financial and military exhaustion and attrition suffered by metropolitan Spain throughout the 17th century, in particular when viewed in comparison with the ascendant rival powers of France and England. The decline occurred during the reigns of the last kings of Habsburg Spain: Philip III, Philip IV and Charles II. Concurrent with the military and economic issues there was a depopulation in metropolitan Spain. The Spanish decline was a historical process simultaneous to the purported general crisis of the 17th century that swept most of Eurasia, but which was especially serious for Spain.

It was so debilitating that Spain went from being the hegemonic power in Europe, with the largest economy on the continent in the mid-1500s, to becoming a financially exhausted, second-rate power by the end of the 1600s. Contrary to metropolitan Spain there was not an equivalent decline in Spanish America where Spain successfully defended and consolidated its dominions, and both the cities and the general population grew. (Note: Indigenous populations in Mexico and the former Inca Empire particular begun to recover in the early 17th century from the devastating 16th century pandemics.)

== Overview ==
The decline of Spain was reflected in a multitude of areas, including demography, which was mirrored in the resurgence of the plague and other epidemics, and the gradual depopulation of cities in metropolitan Spain. In the economy, it was reflected in chronic fiscal problems, monetary alterations, inflation, hyperinflation, the decline of industry, and a steep drop-off in precious metal remittances from the Americas. There were serious socioeconomic issues, such as chronic religious and inquisitorial tension, the expulsion of the Moors, refeudalization, the rampant ennoblement of certain idle sectors of the population, the purchase of positions, and the increased power of Catholic religious orders.

The decline was also reflected politically and territorially, with the initiation of the twelve years' truce and the maneuvers of the Duke of Lerma, the court favourite, spectacularly manifested in the so-called crisis of 1640, after attempts to restore the reputation of the monarchy with the aggressive policy of the Count-Duke of Olivares. As evidenced with the Peace of Westphalia (1648) and the Treaty of the Pyrenees (1659), the pathetic (Note: The use of the adjective "pathetic" has become almost a cliché in the historiography on the period.) situation of the final half of the 17th century was a nadir for the vast Spanish Empire.

Though the high court officials surrounding Charles II were able to carry through some economic reforms to provide stability, the European chancelleries were still watching the so-called bewitched king and his shaky hold on the Spanish throne apprehensively. The chancelleries were aware that, should he remain heirless, then his inheritance, which at the time encircled the globe, was at risk. After a series of complex palace intrigues, Cardinal Luis Fernández Portocarrero decided to support Charles II in passing on his vast global inheritance, through Maria Theresa of Spain, Charles' sister, to Louis XIV of France, Charles' brother-in-law. This was accepted by Louis XIV, who wanted the Spanish crown for his grandson Philip of Anjou.

It was resolved after the death of Charles II of Spain with the Europe-wide War of the Spanish Succession (1701-1714), ending in the Treaty of Utrecht (1713), which divided this vast inheritance between the Habsburgs and the Bourbons, with substantial benefits for England. And that gave way to the Austracist exile and a violent Bourbon repression.

By contrast, the Spanish Decline coincided with the most brilliant manifestations of art and culture, in what has been called the Spanish Golden Age (in Spanish: Siglo de Oro Español). In many of these artistic and cultural triumphs there is a true awareness of decline, which in some cases has been described as negative introspection (Quevedo, the arbitristas). Specifically, the Spanish Baroque (the culteranismo or the churrigueresque) has been interpreted as an art of appearance, scenographic, which hides under an external tinsel a weakness of structure or a poverty of content.

The historiographic interpretation of the causes of the decline has been a much-discussed issue. On many occasions it has been attributed to the clichés characterizing a Spanish national stereotype linked to the black legend present in the anti-Spanish propaganda circulating throughout Europe since the early 1500s. Among these harmful stereotypes included pride in the old Christian caste; an obsession with an indolent nobility highly hostile to entrepreneurialism and industry and prone to violence in the defense of an archaic concept of honor; the uncritical submission, by superstition or fear rather than faith, to despotic power both political and religious; fanatical adherence to the most intolerant, cramped version of Catholicism, which led to quixotic adventures in Europe against the Protestants; and the cruel rule of the conquistadors forced upon the American Indians, which included mass forced conversions.

An alternative pink legend attributes the achievements of the Spanish Empire to an unflagging fidelity to Catholicism, an interpretation of history popular with the reactionary side of Spanish nationalism. At its most extravagant and conspiratorial, this reactionary nationalism attributes Spanish decline to an alleged international conspiracy. In spite of the implausibility of such a conspiracy theory, it gives a decisive role to the Jews and to the secret societies that are imagined to be ancestors of Freemasonry, in addition to linking these crypto-powers to foreign Protestants and Muslims.

From objective points of view backed up by ample contemporaneous documentary evidence, current historiography considers the central role of the authoritarian monarchy of the Habsburgs in undermining long-term Spanish economic power, especially an unhealthy and destabilizing overreliance on imports of New World silver. Such overreliance led to constant budgetary crises for the Spanish government, sovereign bankruptcies and ruinous hyperinflations from the mid-1500s to around 1720. Such long-term economic instability, in turn, constantly sapped Spain's ability to build up large armed forces, and thus to project consistent diplomatic and military power throughout Europe.

This undermining of economic power stands in stark contrast to the more cogent and rational economic policies of the absolute monarchy that the Bourbons were developing at the same time in France. The Bourbon absolute monarchy relied less on unpredictable imports of silver and more on intensive taxation of the vast and productive French agricultural sector, by far the largest in Europe at the time. These predictable and ample tax revenues led to an enviable stability for the French government's budget and expenditures, which translated to a bigger army and navy and thus a greater projection of diplomatic and military power throughout the 1600s, eventually eclipsing that of Spain herself. Nevertheless, the clear and definite divergences of the socio-economic models associated with Catholicism and Protestantism in different parts of Europe from the early 1500s to the late 1700s, as analyzed in the sociology of Max Weber (The Protestant Ethic and the Spirit of Capitalism, 1905), continue to be considered.

== Economic causes ==
Spanish decline can trace its direct causes to the long-term inflation and hyperinflation caused by the New World silver pouring into the Spanish economy after 1530 or so. This one economic problem caused a cascade of events in Spain's economy that ultimately destroyed its prosperity and led to Spain's long-term decline.

These huge quantities of silver first encouraged the Spanish monarchy, starting with Charles V, Holy Roman Emperor (Charles I of Spain) and continuing with the minor Habsburgs, to take out huge debts. These monarchs did so always with the belief that the Spanish crown would be able to pay back the debts in a timely manner through silver shipments. However, silver shipments were quite irregular.

Transporting the bullion from silver mines in central New Spain and Upper Peru required an arduous journey from the inland mountains to the coast. Piracy was rife in the Caribbean and along the Western European littoral. Lots of ships laden with silver were lost to pirates. Then there were the hurricanes—the Caribbean and the Atlantic between Spain and the Americas is frequently buffeted by hurricanes. Lots of silver ships were also lost that way.

When the Spanish monarchy depended on certain deliveries of silver to arrive in Seville, and these were lost or very late, it then defaulted on those debts to its creditors, usually large German and Italian banking houses. This kept happening so often that by the latter half of the 1600s, during the reign of Charles II, no banker anywhere in Europe wanted to lend to the Spanish Habsburg kings anymore. This severely hobbled the Spanish economy as sovereign debt could not be extended to fund large and expensive projects required by the nation, such as the maintenance of a permanent standing army or a large navy.

Second, there was inflation and hyperinflation on their own. Vast surges of silver that would hit the Spanish economy regularly would lead to sudden tremendous spikes in prices for all sorts of goods, especially food. Destabilizing hyperinflation happened so frequently, in fact, that a lot of Spanish people started to move out of Spanish towns and cities into the countryside, becoming tenants of aristocratic landlords. Rents were high due to the inflations, but could be paid in-kind with a percentage of the yearly crops.

These people could then farm the land to grow their own food, and to create their own clothes and implements. That way they divorced themselves completely from a silver cash economy that was so unstable and unpredictable. Of course, this meant that Spain de-urbanized throughout the period of the silver surges, as towns that used to be quite large started to depopulate.

Spain never managed to achieve a city of over 100,000 until 1750 or so (in this case Madrid), when before 1492 it had had at least 4 cities of that size: Seville, Granada, Toledo and Cordoba. Without growing towns and cities there was no robust middle class; without a robust middle class there was no backbone for a strong consumer economy, as had happened in Italy, the Netherlands, France and England throughout the 1500s and 1600s.

The third effect was on Spanish industry itself. Before the discovery of the Americas in 1492, Spain had robust industries inherited from the days of Moorish rule—especially in textiles, steelmaking and glass making. The steel of Toledo was renowned throughout Europe as the hardest made anywhere, for example. By 1650, these industries had all but disappeared in Spain. The huge quantities of silver made it easy to buy finished goods from abroad and import that instead of having the Spanish government support Spanish companies and industries.

Inflation and hyperinflation deeply discouraged investment in industries as the prices for raw materials in steelmaking and textile making, for example, would wildly swing up and down. This caused a cascade of business bankruptcies. Worse yet, the Inquisition after 1492 had driven out the more commercially minded Jews and Muslims of the nation. These people took their industrial and commercial skills, and their money along with them to the Ottoman Empire and the Netherlands, among other nations, leaving Spain bereft of the entrepreneurs most likely to undertake the risks of creating companies and industries.

The people left over were the ones most wedded to traditional Christian pursuits, like farming, sheep raising for wool production, and ranching. The Spanish nobility became so accustomed to living off the vast silver proceeds that it looked down on anyone seeking to build up commercial or industrial enterprises, actively starving investment in nascent Spanish industries. This was the opposite of what the nobility in the Netherlands, England and France were starting to do at the time.

Fourth, the vast amounts of silver decoupled the Spanish government from its people. This is the “Dutch disease” that economists warn about with regards to nations that depend on natural resource revenues for their government budgets. In Spain's case, the silver allowed the government to not really seek taxes from its people. Taxes allow a government to steady its budget, since it knows how much in tax revenues it will receive per year, and how much it will be spending per year. It provides much-needed budgetary predictability.

The Spanish government no longer really did this in the peak of the silver imports in the 1500s and 1600s, so its government budget fluctuated wildly up and down. Vendors to the Spanish monarchy could not depend on such a wildly unpredictable client, so they stopped selling raw materials and finished goods to the crown. These vendors were almost always domestic Spanish industries that could have profited from building up the Spanish navy and army, for example. These vendor contracts usually went to foreign manufacturers instead, who provided the products the Spanish government needed through silver payments.

The lack of budgetary predictability due to very few taxes coming in meant the Spanish government never built a complex system of debt issuance through sovereign bonds, like the English and Dutch governments had pioneered in the 1600s. Bonds are what made the English and Dutch governments so much more financially powerful than they were considering the size of their economies in the 1600s. That's because bonds allow a government to take out long-term debt to fund large infrastructure and other projects. It was through bonds that the Dutch and the English were able to build up their huge navies rather quickly.

Bonds require a predictable tax system since the tax revenues could be used in the short- and long-term to pay maturing bonds coming due. The Spanish crown under the Habsburgs had none of this—even if it wanted to take out bonds for long-term investment in the armed forces and infrastructure, the lack of a good tax system meant that it would always default on them, just like it had with the loans it owed to German and Italian banks. Constant default would have dried up the market of anyone willing to buy Spanish government bonds. Ultimately this hobbled the Spanish crown's ability to think strategically and in the long term.

When the Bourbons assumed control of Spain in 1715, they realized that Spain and its empire needed serious economic, budgetary and tax reforms. Such necessary reforms only came under the reign of the Bourbon Charles III in the mid-1700s. But the damage had already been done and it was hard to unravel all of the economic, social and political distortions caused by this extreme over-reliance on silver shipments from the Americas.

For all these reasons, and more, Spain itself went into steep economic decline starting in the mid-1500s, becoming almost totally dependent on its vast empire in the Americas. Once the riches of its empire were lost in the 1820s and 1830s, Spain could not support itself economically, like France and the UK, and spiraled down into a deep poverty that took a long time to resolve.

== Political background ==
The roots of the steep economic decline that caused the Spanish decline can be traced back to the marriage alliances between Ferdinand the Catholic and Maximilian of Habsburg. This foreign policy centered around isolating and surrounding France, Europe's hegemonic power at the end of the Middle Ages until its displacement by Spain in the Italian Wars, and defense of the Holy Roman Empire and its larger possessions, which included the Netherlands, Austria, Bohemia and Hungary, also threatened by France. A series of deaths of Ferdinand's heirs, first his male heir John, then his daughter Isabella and her own Hispano-Portuguese heir Miguel, brought accidentally the Habsburg dynasty to the Spanish throne through Joanna, along with the foreign policy of the Habsburgs.

It was Charles V, Holy Roman Emperor, Joanna's son and Maximilian's grandson, who brought together the disparate Habsburg inheritances. In 1516 Charles became king of Castile and Aragon, with their American and Italian possessions, as well as ruler of the Spanish Netherlands. The Austrian, Bohemian and Hungarian territories, the throne of the Holy Roman Empire, and the sovereignty of Flanders and Brabant passed to Charles in 1519.

This complex inheritance determined the foreign policy of Charles V and his successors, to the complete detriment of Spain and its possessions. Spain and its possessions thus had to face France, Pope Clement VII, the Republic of Venice, England, the Duchy of Milan, and Florence, nations which formed the League of Cognac, to defend the Aragonese lands in Italy. Spain and its possessions also had face other war fronts with the rebellious German principalities, the Ottoman Turkish threat to the Mediterranean and Hungary, and the growth of Protestantism in Europe. The spread of Protestantism undid the bonds of union that kept the Holy Roman Empire together, reducing even more the functionality of the imperial government.

All these problems kept Spain constantly overextended in wars, exhausting her already precarious government budget. This wartime overextension triggered the infamous sovereign bankruptcies that bedeviled and economically destabilized the Spanish governments of Philip II and Philip III. In addition to these external pressures, Spain had to face internal problems caused by the War of the Communities of Castile and the Germanías. These rebellions were sparked when the middle nobility of Aragon and Castile revolted against the fiscal exactions suddenly and rudely imposed on them by foreign rulers from Flanders, who had come to Spain with Charles I's court entourage. At the head of this class of new Flemish rulers was the regent Adriano de Utrecht, who ignored, besmirched and belittled both the Castilian and Aragonese Cortes and the customary rights of the native nobility.

== Political consequences ==
The constant wars conducted by Charles V in his defense of his vast realms had incalculable economic and human costs that Spain had to bear. The revenues from Spanish wool exports and other Spanish products were transferred from Spain to Flanders, along with silver and gold imports from the New World. Such transfers were earmarked solely to expend on these costly wars of Charles I. Thus investment in the economy of Spain was squeezed out.

These revenues from Spanish exports and New World silver and gold shipments proved insufficient or did not arrive to the Flemish port of Antwerp due to piracy. This forced Charles I to seek numerous enormous loans from German and Italian bankers, which seriously compromised and mortgaged the economic future of Spain. Thus, his son Philip II had to declare bankruptcy three times during his reign, in 1557, 1575 and 1597, as his economic policies were insufficiently productive to provide the revenues necessary to pay these enormous loans.

Though Philip II had inherited these giant debts from his father's wars, he did not inherit the throne of the Holy Roman Empire, which passed, along with the Austrian, Bohemian and Hungarian lands, to his uncle Ferdinand in 1555. Thus the Habsburg dynasty was split into two, with the senior Spanish branch headed by Charles V's first-born, Philip II, and the Austrian junior branch headed by Ferdinand, Charles V's younger brother.

During his reign, Philip II managed, not without difficulty, to definitively remove France from any claims on Italian lands through the Peace of Cateau-Cambrésis, settled in 1559, and to stop the advance of the Ottomans into the western Mediterranean at the Battle of Lepanto in 1571. Likewise, as grandson of John III of Portugal, he incorporated Portugal and its colonies into the Spanish Empire in 1580. It was at this juncture that the Spanish Empire acquired one of its greatest territorial extents, although this enormous empire was also going to be even more difficult to coordinate and defend.

Philip II had less luck in the fight against the Protestants. His Spanish forces could not prevent the secession of the United Provinces in the northern Netherlands in 1579. The Protestant Dutch rebels were supported by England and other Protestant kingdoms and duchies fearful of Spanish Catholic domination. Philip II could also not contain England's maritime expansion, as exemplified by the English naval victory over the Invincible Armada in 1588 and the constant piracy that preyed on Spanish trans-Atlantic shipping undertaken by corsairs in the employ of the English crown. Though these failures were partially compensated by victories like the English Armada and a relative stagnation in the Dutch theater, maintaining Spanish hegemony in Europe for some time, the economic system that supported these very war efforts was already going down. The weakened Spanish economy and government finances presaged the greater military and diplomatic decline that transpired in the 1600s.

== Period of the minor Habsburgs ==
=== Philip III ===
Spanish territories in the time of Philip II.

The decline that started at the tail end of Philip II's reign worsened under the reign of Philip III, who could not continue the very costly foreign policy of his predecessors due to insufficient government finances. The revenues of the Spanish crown were not small, but the wars consumed that and much more. This economic precariousness was aggravated by the expulsion in 1609 of the Moriscos, the population descended from the Muslims that still remained in Spain. The Moriscos were the population principally responsible for the agricultural economy of Valencia, in the crown of Aragon, among other important economic sectors within Spain.

The crown expelled the Moriscos from Spain due to suspicion and fear of the possibility of a new uprising that would coincide with a Berber or Ottoman Turkish invasion, marked by the precedent of the Rebellion of the Alpujarras, which had acquired enormous proportions before being put down. The Moriscos were detested by the Church, which doubted the sincerity of their conversion. Their expulsion was relatively negligible in the large imperial economy, but it still left large human capital holes at a local level.

Wars continued consuming manpower and money for little benefit. Philip's main in the Dutch theater, the renowned military man Ambrogio Spinola, was forced to bankroll the warring effort off his own pocket and operate semi-autonomously. Different was Duke of Osuna, Viceroy of Sicily and Naples, who operated a lucrative Mediterranean privateering business resulting not only in revenue, but also tide-turning victories against the Ottoman Empire like that of Battle of Cape Gelidonya (1616). However, consistent neglect and opposition from the court prevented Osuna from establishing this system, which effectively disintegrate after he was recalled.

The monetary situation in Spain during Philip III's rule continued to be highly precarious, as the currency was devalued, aggravating long-term inflation. Growing political corruption only added to this negative economic situation, along with rampant absenteeism among officials in government administration, especially with regards to crucial tax-collection services.

Philip III lacked the ruling capabilities of his father and grandfather. So he delegated many government functions to aristocrats in his confidence. The figure of the valido or favourite thus arose during his reign. However, these aristocrats were quite feeble in their governing capabilities. Both the Duke of Lerma, and his son and successor to the position, the Duke of Uceda, were revealed as mediocre governors, more worried about increasing their personal fortunes than in solving the serious economic and political problems facing the monarchy. This governmental incompetence made its mark from 1618 onward, as Spain became deeply embroiled in the Thirty Years' War, supporting the junior Austrian branch of the Hapsburgs in their fight against the Protestant polities within the Holy Roman Empire.

=== Philip IV ===
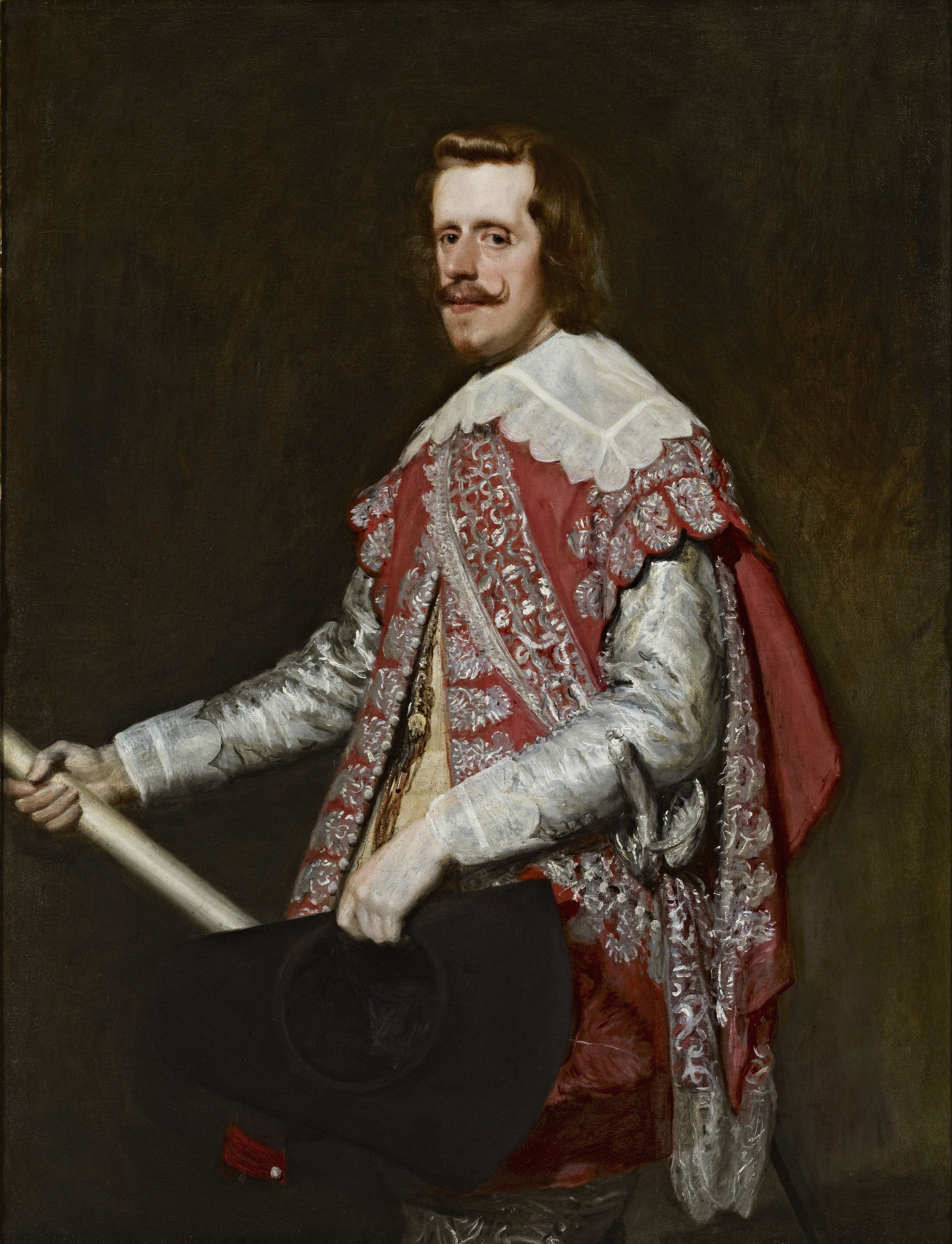
Philip IV of Spain

The ascent to the throne of Philip IV in 1621 meant the rise of a new and powerful valido within the Spanish court, the Count-Duke of Olivares. A member of a minor branch of an important noble family, the Duke of Olivares increased his personal income and possessions, though to a lesser extent than his predecessors. The Duke of Olivares proved to be far more capable with politics and administration than his predecessors, albeit much more ambitious and inclined to war as well.

In 1624 the Duke outlined his reform program of governance to the young Philip IV. Its objective was to ensure that the monarchy effectively unified all the economic, human and military resources of its various kingdoms under one administrative roof, as exemplified by the Union of Arms of 1626. Thus new and ample military resources were expended in the wars in which the Spanish crown was then engaged: with Holland and England for colonial domination in South America, the Caribbean and the East Indies, and with various European states, like Cardinal Richelieu's France, to defend Habsburg supremacy on the continent.

The Duke's reform program disrupted the political and administrative balance that constituted the very essence of the Spanish crown founded by the Catholic Monarchs over 110 years earlier. This earlier construct constituted a confederation of different kingdoms that retained customary legal, economic and administrative rights and privileges as autonomous jurisdictions. The Duke's program hastened the demise of this confederate construct in favor of a more centralized power residing in the royal court in Madrid. That was something that the subjects of these disparate kingdoms were not willing to tolerate, especially in the crown of Aragon and in the light of the costly wars and conflicts.

Thus the 1640s proved to be disastrous for the Duke of Olivares' program of centralization, threatening the collapse of the entire Spanish monarchy. The Portuguese instigated a short and successful rebellion in 1640, naming John IV king and thus installing the Braganza dynasty. In doing so, Portugal wrested its colonial empire back from the destructive military and administrative neglect that characterized the reigns of Philip II and Philip III. Simultaneous to these events in Portugal was a large uprising in Catalonia that lasted from 1640 to 1652. This rebellion almost separated Catalonia from the Spanish crown, paving the way for eventual incorporation into France, which did manage to permanently annex the trans-Pyrenean counties of Roussillon and Cerdanya. Secessionist uprisings also broke out in Andalusia in 1641, Sicily between 1646 and 1652, and Naples between 1647 and 1648.

Meanwhile, on the European war fronts, the arrival of Cardinal-Infante Ferdinand as governor of the Spanish Netherlands represented the last great victories of the Spanish Armies, first of them the Battle of Nördlingen (1634). However, with Olivares' opposition and Ferdinand's own untimely death, fortunes turned south for the Hapsburg coalition in the Thirty Years' War, complicated by the official entry of France into the conflict in 1635, which Ferdinand had temporarily checked. The 1643 defeat by the French at the Battle of Rocroi and the subsequent fall from grace of the Duke of Olivares marked a turning point, one where everything would go from bad to worse. The economy again suffered from the war efforts, complicated by bad harvests, the continuous devaluations of the currency and the alienation of positions.

The demographic problem caused by the death or absence of so many young men became more acute. Four bankruptcies were declared (1627, 1647, 1656 and 1662), while the possessions and trade with America suffered the harassment of the English and Dutch, and France expanded at the cost of absorbing the Spanish possessions on its borders. The Treaty of Münster (1648) and the Treaty of the Pyrenees (1659) ratified the end of Spanish hegemony in Europe, which passed the baton to the powerful France of Louis XIV.

=== Charles II ===
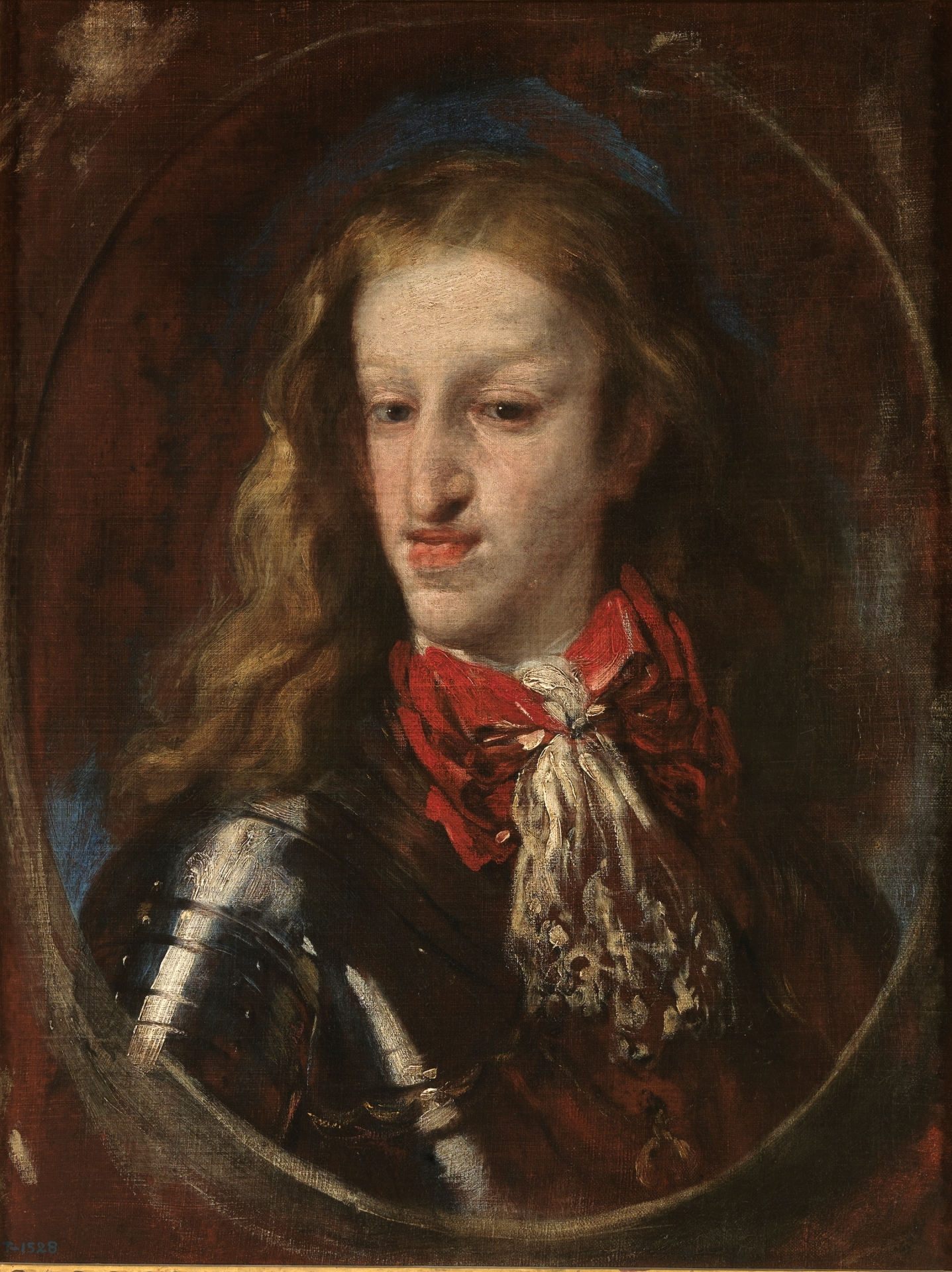
Charles II

The death of Philip IV meant the enthronement of Charles II the Bewitched, so called because of extremely fragile health, which caused rumors of mental and physical disabilities. His reign represented the lowest point of the Spanish decline, with a court full of intrigues in which during ten years the regent, the queen mother Mariana of Austria and her confessor, the German Jesuit Nithard, who pretended to act as valido, disputed the power with Don Juan José of Austria, bastard son of Felipe IV.

However, in the midst of these problems and the harassment suffered by the Spanish possessions, many of which fell into the hands of his enemies, the first glimpses of recovery took place. When Charles was declared of age, aware of his limitations, he entrusted the government to the Duke of Medinaceli and the Count of Oropesa. The administration and finance reform projects, proposed by the arbitrists and applied, in part, by the new valides, would be the prelude to the important changes introduced in the 18th century by the enlightened ministers of the Bourbon dynasty.

Charles' reformist policies also managed to ensure the military defense of the empire's outskirts the emergent France of Louis XIV, forming alliances with, although the result of the wars waged often meant small territorial losses in the Spanish Netherlands. More successfully at long term, it also marked the creation of the guarda costa privateers to fight off foreign piracy and contraband in their overseas territories, a significant event after both the Trastamara and Habsburg dynasties had shown wary attitudes towards authorizing privateers. Charles' armies also saw limited participation in the Great Turkish War, obtaining distinction in battles like the Siege of Buda (1686).

The childless death of Charles II in 1700, however, opened a period of uncertainty. The will of the deceased, influenced by Francophile sectors seeking the secure the support of Louis XIV, named Philip of Anjou, great-grandson of Philip IV of Spain and grandson of Louis, as heir. But there were other candidates with rights, such as Ferdinand of Bavaria and, above all, Archduke Charles of Habsburg, who did not accept this solution and won supporters in Spain. Finally, after the War of the Spanish Succession (1701–1714), Philip of Bourbon, supported by his powerful grandfather, became the founder of a new dynasty in Spain, although at the cost of the empire's Italian and Flemish territories.

== Society and culture ==
The reign of Habsburg Spain brought serious social problems to Spain:

- Religious persecutions due to intolerance. The Inquisition fostered corruption and delation, and was a contributing factor to Spanish Decline. It became a method to destroy enemies, jealous friends and even to settle property disputes or to gain influence.
- Decline of industries of all kinds, due to the sale of raw materials to obtain liquidity quickly, and the great increase in imports, fatal for the loom industry.
- Desertification of Castile, due to the support given by Philip II to the Mesta to obtain a greater quantity of merino wool, so that the uncontrolled transhumant grazing ended with the cultivated fields by not respecting the royal cattle trails.
- Abandonment of large areas due to several causes: emigration to America, the wars and expulsion of the Moors and the half million victims of the great plague of 1598–1602.
- Bureaucracy: The expansion of the Spanish Empire in the New World was carried out from Seville. The control of the Americas was carried out by viceroys that functioned with effective autonomy. The Habsburgs, a family that had traditionally ruled over several non-contiguous dominions and had been forced to delegate autonomy to local administrators, duplicated these feudal policies in Spain, particularly in the Basque Country and Aragon. That way, taxes, infrastructure improvement and internal trade policies were defined independently by each region, maintaining internal customs barriers and tolls. The Count-Duke of Olivares considered it essential that the bureaucracy be centralized, and even supported the complete union of Portugal with Spain, although he never had the opportunity to make his ideas a reality. After Charles I abdicated, the bureaucracy had become ever larger and more corrupt until, by the dismissal of Olivares in 1643, it became obsolete.

From the cultural point of view, the sciences shone, such as Jerónimo de Ayanz y Beaumont with his inventions, Francisco Hernández de Toledo and his beginning of taxonomy, Juan de Herrera and the foundation in 1582 of the 'Academia Real Mathematica', the School of Salamanca with its philosophical, theological and economic theories, in addition to its leading role in the creation of the Gregorian calendar, Domingo de Soto and his postulates on gravity or Jerónimo Muñoz and his description of the supernova SN 1572.

In the arts, especially painting with authors such as Velázquez, Claudio Coello, Bartolomé Murillo and others. There were also great writers, poets and theaters or historians such as Cervantes, Lope de Vega, Juan de Mariana, Quevedo or Calderón de la Barca, which has led to call the time of Philip IV the Spanish Golden Age.

== See also ==
- Ancient Regime of Spain
- Habsburg Spain
- History of science and technology in Spain
- History of Spain
- House of Habsburg
- Spanish Empire
- The two Spains
