= Arbitrista =

The arbitristas were a group of reformist thinkers in late 16th and 17th century Spain concerned about the decline of the economy of Spain and proposed a number of measures to reverse it. Arbitristas directed analyses of problem and proposals ("memorials") for their solution to the king, asking him to take a particular action in the economic or political sphere. The increase in the production of proposals and analyses outlining solutions to the perceived problems of the empire were at a pace comparable to the inflation in the real economy during the price revolution of the sixteenth century and increased further with the crisis of the seventeenth century.

== General description ==
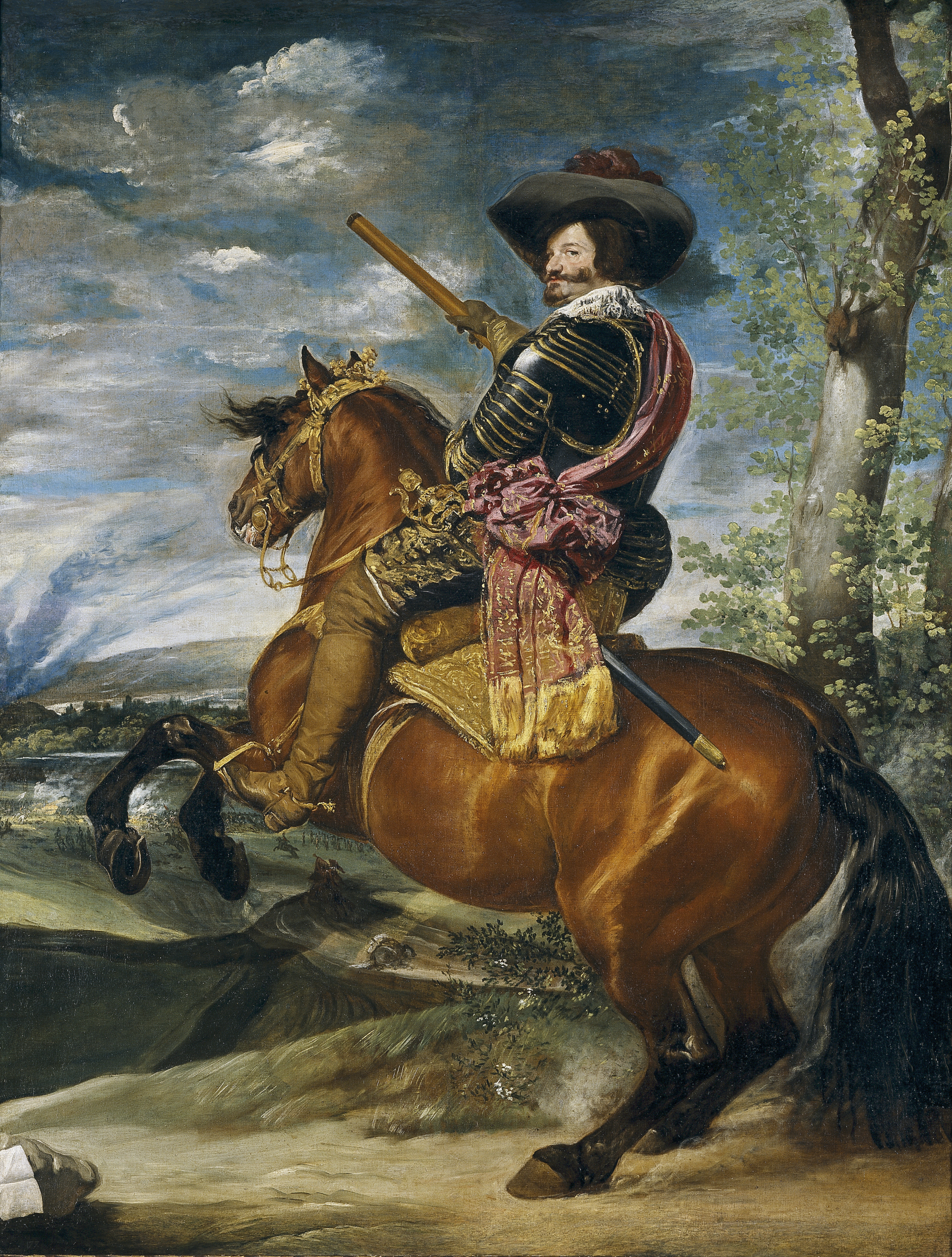
Gaspar de Guzmán, Count-Duke of Olivares, who was influenced by the arbitristas, but failed to prevent Spain's further decline.

Arbitrismo developed mainly in Castile during the second half of the sixteenth century and the seventeenth century. It is related intellectually to the School of Salamanca. Arbitrismo is part of the first economic literature worthy of such a name, simultaneously and largely based on the mercantilism of other European kingdoms, such as France and England. The solution ("arbitrio") in this context to any measure that the monarch can adopt for the benefit of the realm, in the exercise of his sovereignty and by his own will. In the plural, arbitrios was a name given to certain taxes used for public expenditures; it was also applied to a fiscal figure who reports short-term benefits and does not require negotiation with taxpayers. The arbitristas outlined specific reforms aimed at reversing Spain's perceived decline.

The arbitristas ... of the early seventeenth century all put forward programmes of reform. Royal expenditure must be regulated, the sale of office halted, the growth of the church checked. The tax system must be overhauled, special concessions be made to agricultural laborers, rivers be made navigable and dry lands irrigated. In this way alone could Castile's productivity increased, its commerce restored, and its humiliating dependence on foreigners, on the Dutch and the Genoese, be brought to an end.

Arbitristas put faith in empiricism, so that they gathered information about an identified problem and then sought the solution. Some arbitristas argued that the large quantities of silver and gold arriving from the mines in Spain's American colonies was doing great damage to the Spanish economy. The Spanish valido Count-Duke of Olivares was strongly influenced by the arbitristas. Arbitristas were also present in the Indies, where they sought the ear of the viceroys.

Arbitrio and arbitrista ("solution", "one who solves") came to be considered derogatory at the time. They were seen to be equivalent to absurd and impossible opinions and certain characters called "crazy reasoners" or "republican and government crazy" of the time. The first use of the concept of arbitrismo in that context has been found in El coloquio de los perros, one of the Exemplary Novels of Miguel de Cervantes (1613). Francisco de Quevedo, in several passages of his works, describes well-meaning arbitristas ("arcigogolantes") as the cause of all kinds of catastrophes; one of them is so engrossed in writing his theories that he does not realize that he has taken out an eye with his pen. Some of their more outlandish schemes were satirized, including inventors of useless gadgets and alchemy. This attitude of ridicule is still present in the colloquial meaning of the word.

== Notable arbitristas ==
=== Tomás de Mercado ===
Tomás de Mercado, a Sevillian who died in 1575, continued in the tradition of the School of Salamanca and when young went to Mexico. His vision of Spain's economic problems took into account the Indies. He became a Dominican friar in 1553, earning a doctorate in theology and standing out as a moralist. He reflected on the ethics of commercial relations and on returning to Spain he taught at the universities of Seville and Salamanca. In 1569 he published Sum of deals and contracts (Suma de tratos y contratos), that was reedited two years later. It describes the mercantile uses of the time in Seville and Medina del Campo. This work reflects on the foundation of interest praising the ethical uses of finances and counter to the restrictive interpretation of the Catholic Church that deemed it usury. The analysis raises and deepens the quantitative theory of money from the tradition of the School of Salamanca, especially with regard to the international circulation of foreign currency.

=== Luis Ortiz ===
Luis Ortiz was active during the second half of the sixteenth century and accountant of the Treasury of Castile during the reign of Philip II, wrote a memorial to the King so that no monies leave Spain, after the bankruptcy of the Austrias. This was the first text of the Spanish mercantilists, in which he considers that the decline in prices lies in the conservation of gold in Castile and, for this purpose, he creates a plan with which he intends to promote resources. The memorial was published in 1558 and did not have much impact, despite to its illuminating analysis of the economic crisis of the kingdom. Among the main measures proposed was the withdrawal of all types of leisure, the introduction of work and the creation of manufactured products instead of only exporting raw materials, as well as the abolition of existing customs between the various Hispanic kingdoms, the disentailment of church property and a tax reform. He analyzed the monetary problems of Spain and studied solutions to solve the situations created in the country because of the tendency to export raw materials and import manufactures paid with the gold from the Indies. He intuited the concept of economic structure and consistently proposed not one, but a wide range of initiatives that could have brought the kingdom out of the morass it was in, such as increasing productivity, promoting population growth, extending irrigation and starting a repopulation forest. Moreover, he was aware of the problem arising from the remittances of gold and silver that came from the Indies and proposed restricting monetary expansion and discouraging consumption.

=== Martín González de Cellorigo ===
Martín González de Cellorigo, born in Pancorbo (Burgos) in 1559 and died around 1633, was active during the first half of the seventeenth century. He studied at the University of Valladolid and was a lawyer of the Royal Chancery there. He continued the ideas of the School of Salamanca and directed two memorials to the future Philip III of Spain, noting that the inflation caused by the arrival of American silver was the main cause of the evils of the kingdom, since the money in circulation should be limited to the amount of transactions produced. It was his conviction that wealth only grows "by the natural and artificial industry" and, therefore, speculative operations and administrative privileges actually impoverished the kingdom generating the abandonment of trades and productive activities. In 1600 his main work was published, Memorial of the necessary and useful policy of restoration of Spain and its states, and universal performance of these kingdoms. In Memorial, he denounced the proposal of the expulsion of the Moriscos, a policy that was not popular with the arbitristas of the time. His views on Moriscos in general, however, may have been more complex as he also wrote in (1600) that "Spain has become a republic of bewitched beings who live outside the natural order"

=== Sancho Moncada ===
Sancho Moncada, also in the seventeenth century, can be considered equally linked to the School of Salamanca. In 1619 he wrote some Discourses that would later be reissued in 1746 as the Political Restoration of Spain. He delves into the quantitative theory of money and represents the most complete Spanish model of mercantilism. He pointed out the weaknesses of the Spanish economy and especially the penury and the invasion of foreign products, and denounced that the kingdom had become a debtor of the enemy powers. His solution was to propose a severe protectionism of mercantile discipline supervised by the Inquisition. In addition, it was necessary to promote the industry as Jean-Baptiste Colbert would later propose in France. His work, unlike that of other arbitrators, enjoyed great prestige and influence and was taken over by the great enlightened of the eighteenth century, when it was reissued.

=== Pedro Fernández de Navarrete ===
The Riojan Pedro Fernández de Navarrete (1564 - 1632), canon of Santiago, Seneca translator humanist and royal adviser, was inspired by Cellorigo and Moncada to write his Conservation of Monarchies, a work of mercantilist bias that advocated the control of imports and the promotion of exports, although it did not fall into the trap of bullionism, because it understood that the overabundance of money is pernicious if there are no goods that can be acquired. He proposed the development of productive investments and criticized the luxury and contempt for industrial and manual trades by the nobility and nobility of Spain of his time.

=== Luis Valle de la Cerda ===
Luis Valle de la Cerda wrote in 1600 Performance of the Patrímonto of His Majesty and of the kingdoms, without damage of the King and vassals, and with rest and relief of all, through the public Treasury and Montes de Piedad. His work was highly valued by the Cortes, which supported this initiative, and reissued it in 1618. The Montes de Piedad was an idea in a way similar to the Granados that already worked, as credit entities of municipal foundation and grain stores that lent to the farmers.

The foundation of the first Monte de Piedad was made in Madrid by Father Piquer in the early eighteenth century, and in the mid-nineteenth century was associated with the Savings Bank (founded by the Marquis of Pontejos). These financial institutions already correspond to a protocapitalist world, in which other important institutions also functioned, such as the Five Greater Guilds of Madrid or the Bank of San Carlos, antecedent of the Bank of Spain.

=== Juan de Castro ===
Juan de Castro was a priest with ties to the Genoese banking community. His critique of the economy focused on the lack of data to understand the most basic aspects of the overseas trade. These included the lack of knowledge of demand for goods, the proportion of foreign goods to domestic sent to the Indies, and comparative prices of goods in European markets. Spanish merchants functioned without knowledge of matters in which European merchants were experts. He also commented on the socioeconomic patterns of foreign merchants, whose sons married Spanish women and their sons could operate legally within the restrictive Spanish system, but the most promising of these young men were sent to Genoa to learn the real mechanics of international trade. These foreign enterprises with insider status were a part of extended family enterprises, so that they could operate on a truly international scale. “They were well positioned to exploit colonial markets to the disadvantage of their under-capitalized and poorly informed Spanish competitors whose capital averaged [only] 20,000 pesos.” Foreign merchants did not want to completely undermine the structure of trade, so made loans to Spanish merchant firms to keep them participating in the trade.

=== Other writers ===
Antonio Serra, a Neapolitan (and therefore a subject of the same Catholic Monarchy of the Habsburgs), wrote Breve trattato delle causa che possono far abbondare with the historical and intellectual context of Castilian abitrismo. He attributed the shortage of currency in the Kingdom of Naples to a deficit in the balance of payments, a term that it defines with a complete analysis, rejecting the idea that the monetary shortage could be due to the exchange rate, and proposing export incentives as a solution. It also seems that he formulated a similar concept to the law of diminishing returns for agriculture.

Antonio López de Vega ( Heraclitus and Democritus of our century ), considered war the cause of decadence.

Francisco Martínez de Mata ( Memorials and Discourses , 1650–1660), was "critical of foreign merchants who left Spain only 'the responsibility of keeping [the colonies] while Spaniards are their miserable servants'." He urged the revival of Spanish manufacturing, the end of foreign tax farmers, and the creation of an investment bank to provide credit to Spanish entrepreneurs.
