= Price revolution =

Series of economic events in Western Europe

The Price Revolution, sometimes known as the Spanish Price Revolution, was a series of economic events that occurred in the second half of the 16th century, and most specifically linked to the high rate of inflation that occurred during this period across Western Europe. Prices rose on average roughly sixfold over 150 years. This level of inflation amounts to 1.2% per year compounded, a relatively low inflation rate for modern-day standards, but rather high given the monetary policy in place in the 16th century.

Generally it is thought that this inflation was caused by the large influx of gold and silver from the Spanish treasure fleet from the New World, including Mexico, Peru, Bolivia and the rest of the Spanish Empire.

Specie flowed through Spain increasing its prices and those of allied European countries (e.g., the imperial territories of Charles V). Wealth then spread to the rest of Western Europe as a result of the Spanish balance of payments deficit, or was directly introduced to countries like Great Britain and the Kingdom of France, using piracy to attack the Spanish fleet. This enlarged the monetary supply and price levels of many European countries.

== Background ==
Most historians look at the end of the Renaissance as the start of the Price Revolution. Often considered a time of peace for the Western European population, the Renaissance was a period when Western Europe experienced equilibrium in the price of commodities and labor. It also was a period when there was a high concentration of wealth in the hands of a few (the Black Death had wiped out nearly a third of the population a century before). Additionally, Europe experienced technological advancement in the mining industry, the stream of currency through debasement from royals, and the emergence of Protestantism.

The severe shortage of precious metals during the late 15th and early 16th centuries eased in the second half of the 16th century. The Spanish mined American gold and silver at minimal cost and flooded the European market with an abundance of specie. This influx caused a relative decrease in the value of these metals in comparison with agricultural and craft products. Furthermore, depopulation – specifically in southern Spain – resulted in a high rate of inflation. The failure of the Spanish to control the influx of gold and the price fluctuations of gold and silver from the American mines, combined with war expenditures, led to three bankruptcies of the Spanish monarchy by the end of the 16th century.

According to a 'structural vectorautoregression model', in the 16th century, prices increased consistently throughout Western Europe, and by the end of the century prices reached levels three to four times higher than at the beginning. The annual inflation rate ranged from 1% to 1.5%. Since the monetary system of the 16th century was based on specie (mostly silver) this inflation rate was significant. The specie-centered monetary organization had its own price-level stabilization property: rising commodity prices led to a fall in the purchasing power of the monetary metals, and therefore less incentive to mine them and more incentive to use them for non-monetary purposes. This stabilizing adjustment of the money supply led to long-run stability of price levels regardless of permanent shifts in money demand over time. Therefore, the long-run inflation can only be explained either by the devaluation of coins or by shifts in the supply of the specie. An increase in the productivity of mining in Peru led to a fall in the price of metals relative to rising prices for other commodities in Europe. This process is only remedied if the purchasing power of the metal is equal to its production costs.

== Causes ==
=== Influx of gold and silver ===
From an economic viewpoint the discovery of new silver and gold deposits as well as the productivity increase in the silver mining industry perpetuated the price revolution. When precious metals entered Spain, this influx drove up the Spanish price level and caused a balance of payments deficit. This deficit occurred on account of Spanish demand for foreign products exceeding exports to foreign markets. The deficit was financed by the metals that entered these foreign countries and in turn increased their money supply and drove up their price levels.

The increased importation of specie to Spain started in Central Europe around the beginning of the sixteenth century. According to Michael North (1994) central European silver output doubled between 1470 and 1520, and increased even more in the 1520s with the new mine of Joachimsthal. Also during this time the Spanish and Portuguese brought a large amount of gold from the New World to Europe. Starting in the 1540s a growing amount of silver was shipped to Europe from Zacatecas, Guanajuato and Taxco mines in Mexico and the Potosí mountain in Peru. The production of the Potosí mine increased greatly in the 1560s after mercury deposits had been discovered in the Andes, as mercury was necessary to process the silver. Based on the records of Earl J. Hamilton (1934), the total imports of specie from the Americas during the 16th century amounted to around 210 million pesos, with 160 million of these pesos being imported in the second half of the 16th century. The total amount of silver imported added up to about 3,915 metric tons of silver. However these numbers underestimate the total amount imported to Spain because Hamilton only counted imports recorded by the official Casa de Contratación in Seville, not including the specie shipped directly to Cádiz by the Dutch and British East India Companies. The influx of these precious metals and the resulting money supply shocks help explain the price increase in Spain during the 16th century.

=== European silver production ===
Some accounts emphasize the role of increased silver production within Europe itself. According to Nef, the output of silver mines in Bohemia, Germany and Hungary increased rapidly from c. 1460 to c. 1510. Production peaked in the 1530s, thereafter slowly declining for the next 30 years. After 1560, the decline in European silver production was rapid. Flynn contends that imports of silver from Spanish America is behind this decline in European silver mining.

=== Quantity theory of money ===
The first scholar to make a quantity-theory link between the influx of American "treasure" and the Price Revolution was Martín de Azpilcueta in 1556, although French philosopher Jean Bodin is more often credited, because of his 1568 response to a 1566 treatise by the Royal Councilor Jean de Malestroit. Malestroit argued that lower-quality coins were the chief culprit of price influx—similar to the periodic inflations of the 14th and 15th centuries. Bodin dismissed this argument, contending that the growing influx of silver from the Spanish Americas was the primary cause of price inflation. Championed for the quantity theory of money, Bodin was able to demonstrate that the inflation of prices in France was due far more to Spanish-American influx than to any change in coin debasement.

Earl Hamilton, a contemporary price revolution theorist, found that no Spanish writer of the 16th century had voiced opinions similar to those of Jean Bodin despite having conducted meticulous research into Spanish treatises, letters, and other documents. This, however, was not true; less well known is an even earlier Spanish publication in a treatise from 1556 by the cleric Martín de Azpilcueta of the Salamanca School, which made virtually the same claim about the role of Spanish-American silver in the rise of prices.

=== Debasement ===
Regardless, Malestroit did put forth several valid claims about the price revolution that continue to hold up today, particularly his argument explaining the different price indexes and why the Spanish prices rose the least and the Brabantine the most. Spain, unlike most other European countries of this era, underwent no debasements of the gold and silver coinages during most of the period, but that all changed in 1599, when the new Spanish king Philip III (1598–1621) introduced the purely copper "vellon" coinage.

Following Henry VIII of England and his infamous "Great Debasement" programme that began 1526, the Spanish King Philip III tried to cement his Spanish legacy through changes in coinage strategy. Previously, Spanish kings (at least from 1471) issued a largely copper fractional coinage called blancas, with a nominal money-of-account value of 0.5 maravedí, but with a very small amount of silver to convince the public that it was indeed precious-metal "money". The blanca issued in 1471 had a silver fineness of 10 grains or 3.47% (weighing 1.107 g). In 1497, that fineness was reduced to 7 grains (2.43% fine); in 1552, to 5.5 grains (1.909% fine); in 1566, to 4 grains (1.39% fine). By the start of the 17th century, inflation took hold of Spain as the gap between nominal and silver-based prices dramatically shifted. The purely copper coinage had done its damage to Spain. The difference between the silver- and vellon-based price indexes in Spain showed that the purely copper coinage other European countries used made up a much smaller proportion of the total coined money supply (something the Spanish kings had overlooked and Malestroit was able to pinpoint).

=== Black Death ===
Demographic factors also contributed to upward pressure on prices with the resurgence of European population growth after the century of depopulation following the Black Death (1347–1353). The price of food rose during the years of the plague, and then began to fall as the population of nations decreased. At the same time prices of manufactured goods rose because of a displacement of supply. As the nations began to recover and repopulate after the Black Death, the increase in population placed greater demands on agriculture. Later on, increased population placed greater demands on an agricultural area that had contracted significantly after the 1340s, or had been converted from arable to less intensive livestock production.

However, population growth and recovery in countries such as England are not consistent with inflation during the early stages of the price revolution. In 1520 at the beginning of the price revolution England's population was roughly 2.5 million people. This is about half of the English population of 5 million in 1300. Critics of the population argument raise the question that if England at the beginning stages of the price revolution was very unpopulated, how could any renewed growth from such a low level immediately spark inflation? It can be argued that population growth led to a price increase in the agrarian sector because of an increase demand for food. Marginal lands that were not very fertile and far away from markets were unable to adopt the technological developments to offset the lower returns of farming. In turn this led to a higher marginal cost to farming and resulted in a price increase for grains and other agricultural goods that surpassed the price increase for non-agrarian commodities during the 16th and beginning of the 17th century. The resurgence of population after the plague is linked with the demand-pull explanation of the price revolution. This "demand-pull" theory states that an increase in the demand for money and the growth of economic activity produced the rise in prices and a pressure to increase the supply of money.

=== Urbanization ===
Some accounts emphasize the role of urbanization. Urbanization contributed to increased trade between Europe's regions, which made prices more responsive to distant changes in demand, and provided a network for the flow of silver from Spain through western and central Europe. Urbanization is often connected with the increased velocity of money theory because the frequency of transactions increases as urban centers grow relative to rural areas. For example, in England, many lands held as common lands were enclosed so that only the landlord could graze his animals. This forced his former tenants either to pay an increased rent, or to leave their own farms. An increase in the number of people unable to afford their farms led to migration into the cities in search of employment. This in turn led to an increase in the velocity of monetary transactions, but was frustrated by the high demand and inelastic supply of food.

=== Population and agricultural growth ===
If the influx of Spanish silver was not the initial cause of the European Price Revolution then the best explanation for the Price Revolution is population growth. This theory developed under Earl Hamilton argues that prices were not driven by specie (which, at most, sets a floor to prices) but by the actions of monopolists (or governments) whose positions in this period were enhanced by the steady population growth in Western Europe. The resurgence of population after the plague is linked to the "demand-pull" explanation of the price revolution, which states that an increase in the demand for money and the growth of economic activity produced the rise in prices and a pressure to increase the supply of money.

The significant increase of European population in the period 1460–1620 meant that there were now more people to be fed, clothed, and housed raising the demand for goods of all kinds. Agricultural products then became crucial to the European market. Producers were unable to respond to the rising demand as new and less fertile land were cultivated. Essentially, marginal costs were increasing and per-capita yields were shrinking, while demand continued to rise. The price of agricultural commodities, especially grain, rose sooner and faster than those of other goods, and the inflation of agricultural prices eventually caused a general increase in price level in all industries. Until the mid-17th century, the number of mouths to feed outran the capacity of agriculture to supply basic foodstuffs, causing the vast majority of people to live in a constant state of hunger. Until food production could catch up with the increasing population, prices, especially those of the staple food, bread, continued to rise. Hamilton's theory pointed to evidence of agricultural price growth, slow nonagricultural price growth and poor timing (of the specie outflow to the East) as tangible evidence of the failure to fix prices and feed the growing populace. Hamilton also pointed to monopolistic and other non-competitive techniques as the typical pricing behavior for European products and factor markets of the period.

== Effects ==
=== Spain ===
==== External debt ====
Rising costs to sustain Habsburg war efforts eventually led to a severe rise of the Spanish public debt, of which German and Italian bankers were the creditors. The Habsburg Charles V, Holy Roman Emperor was also King of Spain and borrowed enormous amounts of money from the Fuggers, the Welsers, and Genoese banking families, in order to be elected Emperor and sustain, for over 35 years, the Imperial foreign policy. To repay such loans, he relied primarily on the vast stream of bullion provided by Spanish America. In the 1520s and 1530s, ships full of Aztec and Inca treasures arrived from Mexico and Peru to the courts of Charles V as homage of Hernán Cortés and Francisco Pizarro. Those treasures were usually minted into coins in Seville and transferred to German bankers in Antwerp, a port city of the Burgundian Low Countries where major agencies of the Fugger and Welser were located. This allowed Antwerp to become the center of the international economy and accelerated the capitalist transition of the Low Countries. Certain golden objects have survived in descriptions: for example, some were displayed in Brussels to the German artist Albrecht Dürer who wrote: "In all my life, I have seen nothing that rejoiced my heart so much as these things". French corsaires were constantly disrupting this trade: notably, the treasure of the Aztec emperor Cuauhtémoc was captured by the French corsair Jean Fleury.

Silver arrived in large amounts, whereas gold was rarer to be found. In 1528, Charles V carved out a colony in Venezuela for his German bankers, hoping to discover the legendary golden city of El Dorado. In 1546, the project came to an end and the German colony was disbanded. In the 1540s and 1550s, the discovery of silver mines in the Americas (such as Potosí, Zacatecas, Taxco, Guanajuato, Sombrerete) increased the flows of precious metals. Overall, 15 million ducats' worth of bullion reached the Imperial treasury during Charles's reign. This contributed to the higher inflation known as the Spanish price revolution: prices doubled in the first half of the 16th century. The rising costs of war had dramatic consequences on Habsburg finances: one campaign in the 1550s cost as much as one war in the 1520s. Charles V was forced to borrow even more and at higher interest rates, which grew from 17% to 48%.

Despite opposition from the Cortes Generales, Charles V managed to impose this vicious circle that progressively weakened the Spanish finances. Furthermore, in the last years of his reign, Charles V could not be economically supported by his non-Spanish possessions: he exempted the Low Countries from taxation after the Revolt of Ghent in 1540, Germany was in the middle of the Schmalkaldic Wars, and the budget surplus of Italian states was wiped out by the Italian Wars. This ultimately put the financial burden of the Holy Roman Empire on the Spanish kingdoms and led to the bankruptcy of Spain. Unable to sustain his projects financially, Charles V abdicated in 1556 and retired to a monastery in 1558. Sovereign default was declared in 1557.

==== Landowners ====
Conditions in 16th century Europe support the view that the separation of constantly rising prices and fixed rents destroyed landowners. But this did not apply to Spain, where rent was not fixed and the power of landowners allowed them to raise rent and replace their tenants based on the tenants' ability to meet payments.

On the other hand, the price revolution brought impoverishment to those who lived on fixed income and small rents, as their earning could not keep pace with Spanish prices. Small landowners of the hidalgo class, the lower clergy, government officials, and many others all found their standard of living reduced as commodity prices rose beyond their means. The situation of the peasants is less clear, for it is difficult to reconcile agricultural prosperity and the great rural emigration to the towns, which in turn makes it difficult to explain the alleged extension of cultivation in Spain. But one thing is certain—wages lagged behind prices.

==== Sellers and traders ====
But landowners and the rich were not the only ones gaining from the price revolution. Anyone with something to sell or trade could reap the benefits of inflation, particularly manufacturers and merchants. However, in the second half of the century, when the conditions of the Price Revolution got worse and relentless inflation began to make Spanish enterprise less competitive in the international and colonial market, not all merchants and manufactures found life enjoyable. Only the more powerful merchants were able to survive foreign competition and in doing so prospered boundlessly. Enormous fortunes were made in the Indies trade (whose expansion was related directly to the rise of prices) and this encouraged more investment and profitable returns. Profitable returns were distributed beyond the merchant houses of Seville to entrepreneurs in other parts of Spain, as the American market took the oil and wine of Andalusia, the wool of Castile, the metallurgical products and ships of the Basque country. To at least the end of the 16th century there was still money to be made in Spain for selected merchants and manufactures.

==== The Crown ====
The Crown, like its ally the aristocracy, was less crippled by the price revolution than the majority of its subjects. Certainly the cost of administration, and of paying, feeding, and equipping its armed forces, rose for the Crown just as the cost of goods did for the private consumer; unlike other countries, Spain was willing to spend at a higher level to maintain their status as a world power. However, the aristocracy in contrast lost less of its savings than the Crown. The aristocracy could raise rents to increase revenue and not face the full consequences of the Price Revolution. The aristocracy allowed prices to remain high, while inflation alleviated the burden of loans, which became a substantial part of their income.

=== Republic of Genoa ===
Unlike many other states of the period, the Republic of Genoa gambled the majority of its economic interest on the Spanish monarchy—bankers invested their money in the crown and farmers of Spanish revenue, while Genoa's merchants and nobles settled in Spain (Madrid, Seville, Kingdom of Naples and Sicily) marrying local nobility and monopolizing majority of the trade. As long as New Spain was sending silver and gold to the consulado de mercaderes in Seville, Genoa could flourish. Genoa became a large credit market as the capital of Italian cities was all drained towards Genoa.

A multitude of small investors, Genoese and others, obtained from the Crown long-term securities (Spanish: juros de resguardo) as collateral for their loans. Also short-term loans known as asientos could be converted into long-term juros. The contracts specified that these securities would be sold if the Crown did not repay the loans. In essence, the Genoese bankers had worked out an interest rate swap. Furthermore, the Crown sold silver spot in Spain to the Genoese in exchange for future delivery of gold in Antwerp, where the gold was used to pay Spanish troops fighting in the Low Countries. Genoa benefited from the price revolution as they enjoyed the advantage of "increasing returns to scale in international financial services". Genoa during the price revolution was a snapshot of global finance at its best. Unfortunately, the decline of Spain in the 17th century brought also the decline of Genoa (due to the Spanish crown's frequent bankruptcies); Genoa's merchant houses particularly suffered. In 1684, Genoa was bombarded by a French fleet as punishment for its long alliance with Spain. As a result, the Genoese bankers and traders made new economic and financial links with Louis XIV.

== Long-term decline of inflation ==
The inflation of c. 1520–1640 eventually petered out with the end of the initial rush of New World bullion. Prices remained around or slightly below the levels of the first half of the 17th century until the onset of new inflationary pressures in the latter decades of the 18th century.

== See also ==
- Economic history of Europe
- Eden Agreement
- European colonization of the Americas
- Great Bullion Famine
- Kipper und Wipper
- Decline of Spain
