= J-Gate =

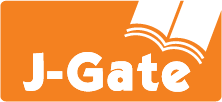
- Producer: Informatics India Ltd (India)
- History: 2001; 25 years ago
- Languages: English

Access
- Cost: Annual Subscription

Coverage
- Disciplines: Multidisciplinary
- Record depth: Index, abstract, full-text, author, topic title and subject keywords
- Format coverage: Journals
- No. of records: More than 100 million articles and 1,00,000+ journals
- Update frequency: Daily

Links
- Website: jgatenext.com

J-Gate is a bibliographic database to access global e-journal literature. As a discovery platform for the research community, it is presented as a website under subscription-based access to a large database of scientific research. It contains abstracts, citations, full-text access for all Open Access journals and other key details from academic journals by covering 100 million+ Indexed articles, 1,00,000+ journals from over 26,000 publishers. It gives two types of quality measure for each title; those are H-index and SJR (SCImago Journal Rank).

== Overview ==
It is developed and launched in 2001 by Informatics India Ltd. As a contribution to the Open Access community, Informatics initially also offered a free platform named Open J-Gate.

The current J-Gate version is categorized into 7 different top level subjects like Biomedical Sciences, Engineering & Technology, Social & Management Science, Agriculture & Biological Sciences, Arts & Humanities, Basic Sciences and Law. J-Gate is accompanied by an extended version, named J-Gate Custom Content for Consortia, offered as a customized resource-sharing platform for Consortium members.

== See also ==
- List of academic databases and search engines
- Microsoft Academic Search
- Google Scholar
- South Asian Journal of Business and Management Cases
