= Indian Citation Index =

- Producer: Diva Enterprises Pvt. Ltd. (INDIA)

Access
- Providers: Various universities, institutions and commercial organizations
- Cost: Yes

Coverage
- Disciplines: Multidisciplinary
- Record depth: Citation indexing, Author, Topic title, Subject keywords, Abstract, Periodical title, Author's address, Publication year
- Format coverage: Research, reviews, editorials, short communication, research note, case study, Research method, opinion papers, observations (R&D), special articles, patent, standard, report (R&D), proceedings papers
- Temporal coverage: 2004 to present
- Geospatial coverage: Indian

Links
- Website: www.indiancitationindex.com

The Indian Citation Index (ICI) is an online bibliographic database that contains abstracts and citations from over 1,000 academic journals in India, spanning scientific, technical, medical, and social sciences, including arts and humanities. The database covers data from 2004 onwards and offers full-text access to titles from Open Access journals, with over 600 currently available. ICI provides search and analytical features.

ICI was launched in India in 2009 and is funded by Diva Enterprises Pvt. Ltd.

== Overview ==
Launched in October 2009 in New Delhi, ICI initially featured 100 journals. It provides full-text access to all Open Access journals, links to Google Scholar for additional information and provides analytical tools.

== Coverage ==
The database has been regularly updated, adding "nearly two/three" journals every month. The target was to add 100 journals.

There are 50 different top level subject categories like Health Science, Mathematics, Computer Science & Technology, Economics, and Agriculture. These subject categories are further sub-divided into second and third levels.

Details about ICI database

- 1100+ Science, technical, medical, and social sciences (including arts and humanities)
- 300+ Open Access journals, ICI provides full text for these journals
- Coverage from 2004 to present day
- 600+ thousand source titles (index articles)
- 13.3+ million references

== See also ==
- Energy Science and Technology Database
- ETDEWEB
- Geographic Names Information System
- Global Health database
- Materials Science Citation Index
- List of academic journal search engines
- List of academic databases and search engines
