= DeepDyve =

Commercial website providing access to scientific and scholarly articles

DeepDyve is a commercial website that sells access to scientific and scholarly articles. A user can buy PDFs of individual papers or get a subscription that offers unlimited reading access to papers from publishers in their network, which includes publishers like Wiley, Springer Nature, JAMA, and Wolters Kluwer.

== Content ==
According to DeepDyve's website and other related materials, there are about 150 publishers in the DeepDyve network; notably, this doesn't include Elsevier/Science Direct, which ended its partnership with DeepDyve in April 2020. Some of the notable publishers are:

- Wiley
- Springer Nature
- Wolters Kluwer
- JAMA
- New England Journal of Medicine
- Oxford University Press
- Cambridge University Press

According to the same sources there are over 25 million articles from more than 15,000 peer-reviewed journals available.

== Technology & Features ==
The current viewing interface (January 2023) for article reading is implemented by rendering the article pages as images on the screen. In addition to viewing the full-text article through a browser, subscribers are prevented from printing more than 20 article pages per month.

== See also ==
- List of academic databases and search engines
