= Physical premotion =

Aspect of Thomist philosophy regarding causality

In the theory developed by Spanish theologian Domingo Báñez and other Thomists of the 16th-century second scholasticism, physical premotion (Latin: praemotio physica) is a causal influence of God into a secondary cause (especially into a will of a free agent) which precedes (metaphysically but not temporally) and causes the actual motion of its causal power (e.g. a will): it is the reduction of the power from potency to act. In this sense, it is a kind of divine concurrence, the so-called concursus praevius advocated by the Thomists.

More broadly, according to this Thomistic theory, physical premotion is the causal influence of any principal cause upon the respective instrumental cause (such as the influence of a scribe upon his pen) by which the instrumental cause is elevated so as to be capable of producing an effect which is beyond its natural powers (e.g., the pen is enabled to write a poem).

In Thomism, the theory of physical premotion helps to explain divine providence (foreknowledge) and universal rulership; on the other hand, it is seen by its critics (chiefly Jesuits defending the alternative theory of Molinism) as leading to theological determinism. Because the proponents of physical premotion are, as Catholics, committed to the freedom of will, their position can be viewed as a form of compatibilism. Whether they really are determinists depends on how strictly the necessity of the connection between a divine decree, the resulting premotion, and the ultimate free act is conceived. The proponents of the theory generally try to avoid resorting to unqualified necessity, their term of choice being "infallibility".

The theory of praemotio physica was applied 1) on the natural level, serving both as a theory of concursus ordinarius and as a theory of instrumental causality; 2) on the supernatural level, serving as a theory of actual grace.

== History ==
Although claimed by Báñez to have its roots in Aquinas, the theory was first explicitly formulated in Domingo Báñez's Apologia Fratrum Predicatorum (1595), in reaction to Luis de Molina's Concordia; and it was further elaborated by Diego Álvarez in his De auxiliis.

A violent controversy ensued between the Dominicans and the Jesuits, leading to a papal intervention). At first (1594) the Pope he simply enjoined silence on both parties so far as Spain was concerned; but ultimately, in 1598, he appointed the Congregatio de Auxiliis for the settlement of the dispute, which became more and more a party one. After holding very numerous sessions, the congregation was able to decide nothing, and in 1607 its meetings were suspended by Paul V, who in 1611 prohibited all further discussion of the question De auxiliis and of discussions about efficacious grace, and studious efforts were made to control the publication even of commentaries on Aquinas. Several regent Masters of the Dominican College of St. Thomas, the future Pontifical University of Saint Thomas Aquinas (Angelicum), were involved in the controversy. Two Dominican proponents of physical premotion, Diego Alvarez and Tomas de Lemos, were given the responsibility of representing the Dominican Order in debates before Pope Clement VIII and Pope Paul V.

In contemporary analytical philosophy, the opponents of Molinism (such as Robert Merrihew Adams or William Hasker) typically do not subscribe to the Báñezian-Thomist theory of praemotio physica; instead, they maintain libertarian freedom but insist that it excludes the possibility of Molinist middle knowledge. The theory thus remains confined to the ranks of traditional Thomism.

== Notable proponents ==
- Domingo Báñez (1528–1604)
- Diego Álvarez (c. 1555–1632)
- Tomas de Lemos (1540–1629)
- John of St. Thomas (1589–1644)
- Joseph Gredt (1863–1940)
