= Concursus Dei =

Philosophical position that divine activity runs parallel to acts of nature

Concursus dei or concursus divinus (Latin, lit., 'divine concurrence') is a theological and philosophical teaching that divine activity runs parallel to the activity of people and things. This notion allegedly resolves the dichotomy between "acts of nature or humans" vs. "acts of God". According to concursus dei, an event can be simultaneously an act of nature or a human act, and also an act of God. Thus, creatures immediately are propelled by God not only according to their origin (creation) and conservation in existence, but also in their causal operations.

== Biblical support ==
In support of the concept, a biblical passage in the Book of Isaiah is often cited: "indeed, all that we have done, you [God] have done for us." (Isaiah 26:12 NRSV). In the New Testament I Corinthians is often cited. There the apostle Paul commented upon his missionary work, "I labored more than anyone else--yet it was not I but the grace of God working through me." (I Corinthians 15:10).

== In Catholic theology ==
In Catholic theology, a distinction is made between concursus simultaneus and concursus praevius, the former being divine influence into the effect of a second cause, parallel, as it were, with its activity, whereas the latter involves divine influence into the causing agent. Thomists insist on both kinds of concursus being required in any action of a created cause and provide an elaborate theory of the "previous concursus", calling it physical premotion. Other theological schools, especially the Jesuits, typically reject physical premotion and claim that concursus simultaneus is sufficient. The theory of concursus is not meant to compromise freedom of will; however, the Thomist doctrine of praemotio physica is blamed of achieving precisely that by its opponents.

Another distinction is between concursus ordinarius (generalis, naturalis) and concursus extraordinarius. Whereas the ordinary concursus is part of the natural order and accompanies every causal activity of a secondary cause whatsoever, an extraordinary concursus is of supernatural order, it is the extraordinary help of divine grace to a created free agent.

== Proponents ==
Notable proponents of this teaching include the renowned German philosopher Leibniz, as well as Descartes and Spinoza. It is also a concept invoked by modern Calvinist theologians.

In Catholic theology, the doctrine of divine concursus is considered a sententia communis and is shared by almost all theologians (a notable exception being Durandus of Saint-Pourçain). The most important proponents of the Thomist version are Domingo Báñez and Diego Álvarez; while their most notable Jesuit opponents are Luis de Molina and Francisco Suárez.
