= Mark Murphy =

Mark Murphy may refer to:

== Sports ==
- Mark Murphy (American football executive) (born 1955), American football executive, former player at defensive back for the Washington Redskins
- Mark Murphy (ice hockey) (born 1976), American ice hockey player who plays for the DEG Metro Stars
- Mark Murphy (safety, born 1958) (born 1958), American former football player for the Green Bay Packers

== Other ==
- Mark Murphy (singer) (1932–2015), American jazz singer
- Mark Murphy (author), author and expert on organizational leadership and employee engagement
- Mark Murphy (politician), member of the New Mexico House of Representatives
- Mark C. Murphy (born 1968), American philosopher

== See also ==
- Marc Murphy (disambiguation)
