= Faith and Philosophy =

- Discipline: Philosophy; religious studies
- Language: English
- Edited by: Jonathan L. Kvanvig

Publication details
- History: 1984–present
- Publisher: Society of Christian Philosophers (United States)
- Frequency: Quarterly

Standard abbreviations
- ISO 4: Faith Philos.

Indexing
- ISSN: 0739-7046 (print); 2153-3393 (web)
- LCCN: 96648356
- OCLC no.: 9801750

Links
- Journal homepage

Faith and Philosophy is a peer-reviewed academic journal published by the Society of Christian Philosophers with support from Asbury Theological Seminary and the University of Arkansas. It is currently edited by Jonathan L. Kvanvig. The journal aims to foster the philosophical examination of religion and Christian faith. In accordance with the goals of the society, Faith and Philosophy seeks to contribute to the continuing effort of the Christian community to articulate its faith in a way that will withstand critical examination, and to explore the implications of that faith for all aspects of human life. In 2019, the quarterly journal became a free open-access online publication and ceased both physical publication and online publication behind a pay wall. The journal's website is faithandphilosophy.com.

== History ==
Shortly after the Society of Christian Philosophers began in 1978, its executive committee voted in 1982 to launch Faith and Philosophy with William Alston as the first Editor and Michael L. Peterson as Managing Editor. It took two years to solicit articles and lay the publishing infrastructure for the journal's first appearance in January 1984. During the later 1980s, the journal became widely recognized as the premiere scholarly journal in the philosophy of religion. The society and its journal were extremely influential both in reflecting and in leading the resurgence in philosophy of religion within professional philosophy. In addition to sponsorship by the Society of Christian Philosophers, Faith and Philosophy has also been supported by patrons, from both within and outside the society, who pledge contributions.

== Editors ==
- 1984–1990: William Alston
- 1990–1995: Philip L. Quinn
- 1995–2000: William J. Wainwright
- 2000–2007: William Hasker
- 2007–2015: Thomas Flint
- 2015–2020: Mark C. Murphy
- 2020–2025: Thomas D. Senor
- 2025–present: Jonathan L. Kvanvig

== Abstracting and indexing ==
The journal is abstracted and indexed in the ATLA Religion Database, Christian Periodical Index, MEDLINE, Periodicals Index Online, Philosopher's Index, PhilPapers, Religion Index One, Religious and Theological Abstracts, and Scopus.

== See also ==
- List of philosophy journals
