= Thomas Flint =

Thomas Flint may refer to:

- Thomas Barnard Flint (1847–1919), Canadian lawyer and political figure in Nova Scotia
- Thomas P. Flint, American philosopher
- Thomas Flint, co-founder of Irvine Company
- Thomas Flint Sr. and Thomas Flint Jr., figures in the history of Middleton, Massachusetts
