= Domingo Báñez =

Spanish Dominican theologian (1528–1604)

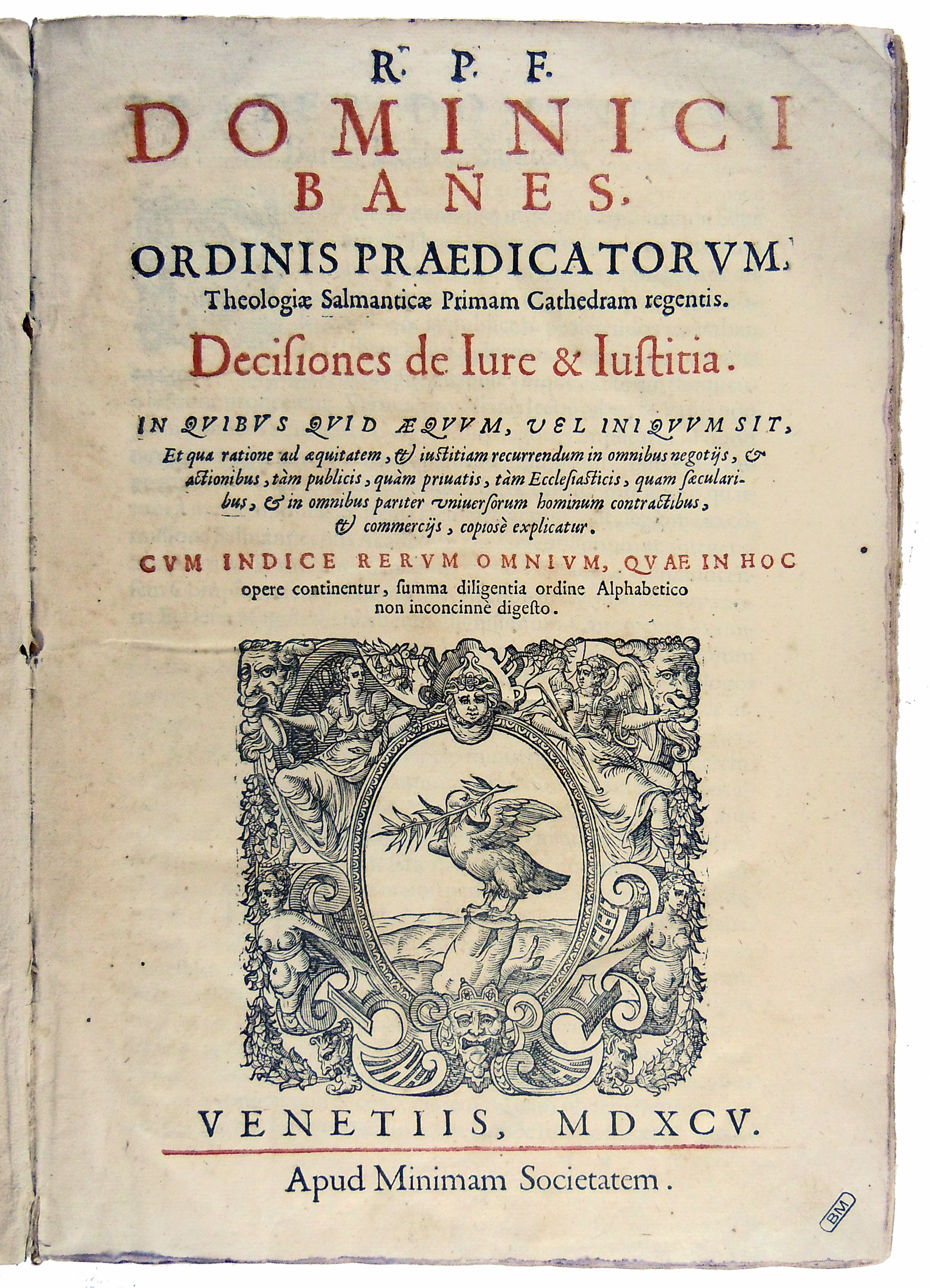
Decisiones de Iure & Iustitia, 1595 (Milano, Mansutti Foundation)

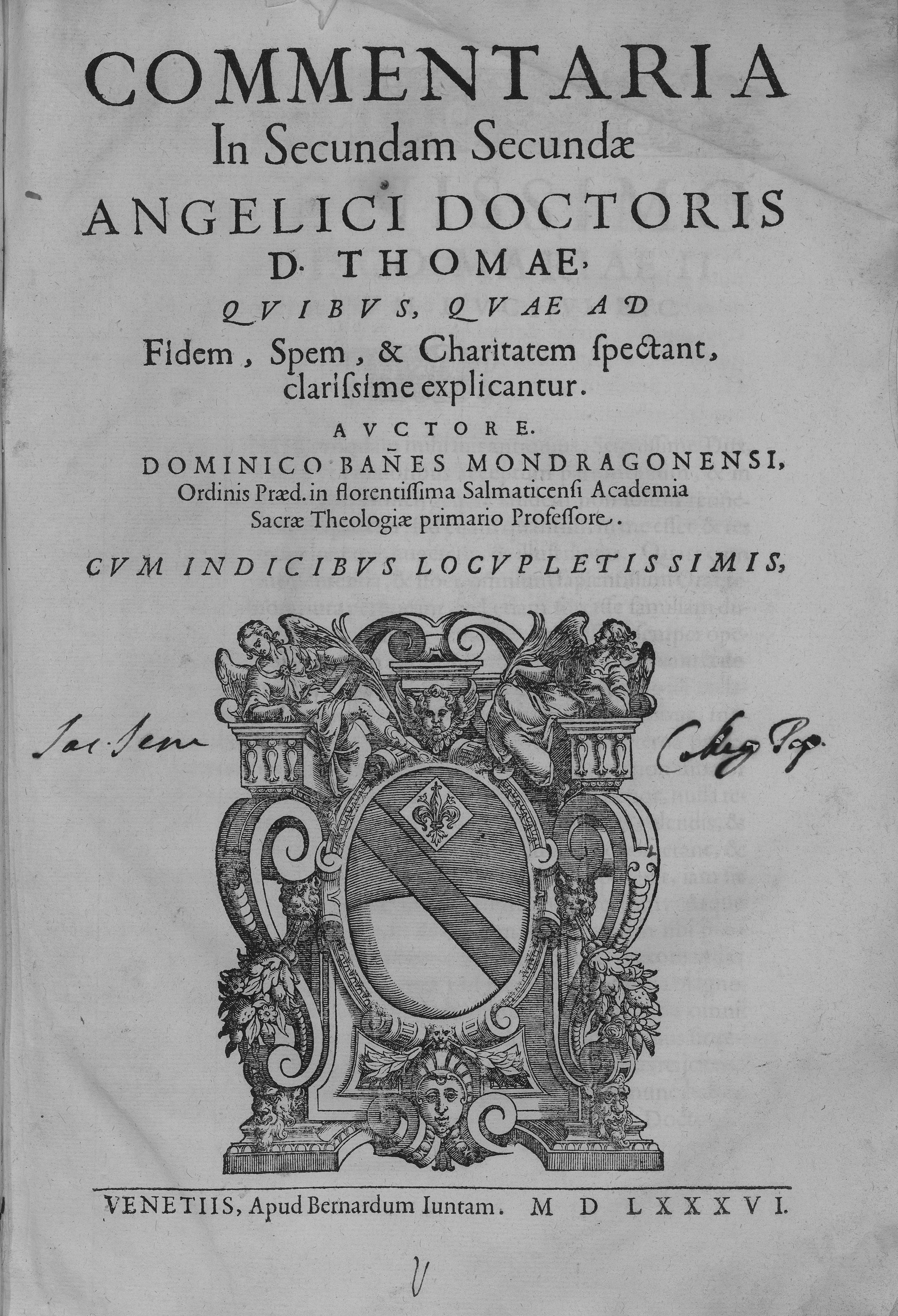
Commentaria in secundam secundae D. Thomae, 1586

Domingo Báñez (29 February 1528, Valladolid – 22 October 1604, Medina del Campo) was a Spanish Dominican and Scholastic theologian and a member of the later School of Salamanca. The qualifier Mondragonensis is sometimes attached to his name and seems to refer to the birthplace of his father, Juan Báñez, at Mondragón in Guipúzcoa.

== Life ==
=== Education and teaching ===
Báñez was born at Medina del Campo, in the province of Valladolid.

At fifteen he began to study philosophy at the University of Salamanca. Three years later he took the Dominican habit at the Convent of St. Stephen, Salamanca, and made his profession 3 May 1547. During a year's review of the liberal arts and later, he had the afterwards distinguished Bartolomé de Medina as a fellow student. Under such professors as Melchior Cano (1548–51), Diego de Chaves (1551), and Pedro Sotomayor (1550–51) he studied theology, laying the foundations of the erudition and acquiring the acumen which later made him eminent as a theologian and an exponent and defender of Thomistic doctrine.

Báñez next began teaching, and under Domingo Soto, as prior and regent, he held various professorships for ten years. He was made master of students, explaining Thomas Aquinas's Summa Theologica to the younger brethren for five years, and incidentally taking the place, with marked success, of professors who were sick, or who for other reasons were absent from their chairs at the university. In the customary, sometimes competitive, examinations before advancement, he was said to have carried off all honours easily.

Báñez taught at the Dominican University of Avila from 1561 to 1566. About 1567 he was assigned to a chair of theology at Alcalá, the ancient Complutum. It appears that he was again at Salamanca in 1572 and 1573, but during the four scholastic years 1573-77 he was regent of St. Gregory's Dominican College al Valladolid, a house of higher studies where the best students of the Castilian region were prepared for a scholastic career.

Elected Prior of Toro, he went instead to Salamanca to compete for the chair of Durandus, left vacant by Medina's promotion to the chief professorship. He occupied this position from 1577 to 1580. After Medina's death (30 December 1580) he appeared again as competitor for the first chair of the university. The outcome was an academic triumph for Báñez and he was installed in his new position amid the acclamations of professors and students. There he laboured for nearly twenty years as a leading theologian of the School of Salamanca and the primary successor of the school after the deaths of Domingo de Soto and Melchor Cano. His name acquired extraordinary authority, and the leading schools of orthodox Spain referred to him as the proeclarissimum jubar-- "the brightest light"—of their country. He eventually became the principal promoter of the strict Thomist orthodoxy found in the De Auxiliis controversy against the Jesuit theologian Luis de Molina.

=== Controversy over free will ===
Báñez in his prime was director and confessor of St. Teresa.

The great controversy, with whose beginnings his name is prominently associated, goes back to a public disputation held early in 1582. Francisco Zumel, of the Order of Mercy, was moderator. Prudencio de Montemayor, a Jesuit, argued that Christ did not die freely, and consequently suffered death without merit, if the Father had given him a command to die. Báñez asked what the consequences would have been if the Father had given command not only as to the substance of the act of death, but also as to its circumstances. Prudentius responded that in that case there remained neither liberty nor merit. Luis de León, an Augustinian, sided with Prudentius and presently the discussion was taken up by the masters in attendance and carried to the kindred subjects of predestination and justification. Other formal disputations ensued, and strong feeling was manifested. Juan de Santa e Cruz, a Hieronymite, felt constrained to refer the matter to the Spanish Inquisition (5 February), and to his deposition he appended sixteen propositions covering the doctrines in controversy. Leon declared that he had only defended the theses for the sake of argument. His chief thought was to prevent them from being qualified as heretical. Notwithstanding these and further admissions, he was forbidden to teach, publicly or privately, the sixteen propositions as reviewed and proscribed.

In 1588, Luis Molina, a Jesuit brought out, at Lisbon, his Concordia liberi arbitrii cum gratiæ donis, bearing the censura, or sanction, of a Dominican, Bartolomeu Ferreiro, and dedicated to the Inquisitor General of Portugal, Cardinal Albert of Austria; but a sentiment against its appearance in Spain was aroused on the ground of its favouring some of the interdicted propositions. The cardinal, advised of this, stopped its sale, and requested Báñez and probably some others to examine it. Three months later, Báñez gave his opinion that six of the 11 forbidden propositions appeared in the Concordia.

Molina was asked to defend himself, and his answers to the objections and to some other observations were added as an appendix, with which, sanctioned anew (25 and 30 August 1589), the work was permitted to circulate. It was regarded as an epoch-making study, and many Fathers of the Society of Jesus rallied to its defense. From Valladolid where the Jesuit and Dominican schools in 1594 held alternate public disputations for and against its teaching on grace, the contention spread over all Spain. The intervention of the Inquisition was again sought, and by the authority of this high tribunal the litigants were required to present their respective positions and claims, and a number of universities, prelates, and theologians were consulted as to the merits of the strife. The matter was referred however, by the papal nuncio to Rome, 15 August 1594, and all dispute was to cease until a decision was rendered. In the meantime, to offset his Dominican and other critics, Molina brought counter accusations against Báñez and Zumel. The latter submitted his defense in three parts, all fully endorsed by Báñez, 7 July 1595. The Dominican position was set forth about the same time by Báñez and seven of his brethren, each of whom presented a separate answer to the charges. But the presiding officer of the Inquisition desired these eight books to be reduced to one, and Báñez, together with Pedro Herrera and Diego Alvarez was instructed to do the work. About four months later Alvarez presented their joint product under the title "Apologetica fratrum prædicatorum in provinciâ Hispaniæ sacræ theologiæ professorum, adversus novas quasdam assertiones cujusdam doctoris Ludovici Molinæ nuncupati", published at Madrid, 20 November 1595. [...] Nearly two years later, 28 October 1597, Báñez resumed the case in a new summary and petitioned the pope to permit the Dominican schools to take up their teaching again on the disputed questions. This was the Libellus supplex Clementi VIII oblatus pro impetrandâ immunitate a lege silentii utrique litigantium parti impositâ, published at Salamanca. An answer to the "Libellus" was conveyed in a letter of Cardinal Madruzzo, 25 February 1598, written in the name of the pope, to the nuncio in Spain:

Inform the Fathers of the Order of Preachers that His Holiness, moderating the prohibition that was made, grants them the faculty freely to teach and discuss, as they did in the past, the subject-matter de auxiliis divinae gratia, et eorum efficaciâ, conformably to the doctrine of St. Thomas; and likewise the Fathers of the Society, that they also may teach and discuss the same subject-matter, always holding, however, to sound Catholic doctrine.

This pronouncement practically ended whatever personal participation Báñez had in the famous controversy.

== Work ==
It has been contended that Báñez was at least virtually the founder of present-day Thomism, especially in so far as it includes the theories of physical premotion, the intrinsic efficacy of grace, and predestination irrespective of foreseen merit. To any reader of Bañez it is evident that he would have met such a declaration with a strenuous denial. Fidelity to St. Thomas was his strongest characteristic. [...] He singles out for special animadversion the views in which his professors and associates dissent even lightly from the opinions of the Angelic Doctor.

Báñez's zeal for the integrity of Thomistic teaching could brook no doctrinal novelty, particularly if it claimed the sanction of Aquinas's name. In the voluminous literature of the De Auxiliis and related controversies, the cardinal tenets of Thomism are ascribed by its opponents to a varied origin: Gerhard Schneeman, Théodore de Regnon and Antoine de Gaudier are probably the foremost modern writers who designate the Thomists as Bannesians. But against them appears a formidable list of Jesuits of repute who were either Thomists themselves or authorities for other opinions. Suárez, for instance, credits Medina with the first intimations of physical premotion and elsewhere admits that Aquinas himself once taught it. Toletus and Pererius considered as Thomistic the Catechism of the Council of Trent, which was the work (1566) of three Dominican theologians. Victor Frins gives it as his opinion that whilst Medina and Pedro de Soto (1551) taught physical predetermination, the originator of the theory was Francisco de Vitoria (d. 1546). The Dominicans Ferrariensis (1576), Cajetan (1507), and John Capreolus (d. 1436) are also accredited Thomists in the estimation of such authorities as the Jesuits Martin Becanus and Azorius, and the theologians of Coimbra. Molina cites the doctrine of a "certain disciple of St. Thomas"—supposedly Báñez—as differing only in words from the teaching of Duns Scotus, instead of agreeing with that of Aquinas. These striking divergences of opinion of which only a few have been cited would seem to indicate that the attempt to father the Thomistic system on Báñez has failed.

The development of Thomistic terminology in the Dominican school was mainly due to the exigencies not only of the stand taken against Molina and the forbidden propositions already mentioned, but of the more significant disputes with Protestant theologians. The "predetermination" and "predefinition" of Báñez and his contemporaries, who included others besides Dominicans, emphasized, on the part of God's knowledge and providence, a priority to, and independence of future free acts, which, in the Catharino-Molinistic theories, seemed to them less clearly to fall under God's causal action. These terms, however, are used by Aquinas himself. The words "physical premotion" were meant to exclude, first a merely moral impulse and, secondly, a concurrence of the divine causality and free will, without the latter's subordination to the first cause. That such terms, far from doing violence to the teachings of their great leader, are their true expression, has been an unvaried tenet of the Thomistic school. One of the presiding officers of the Congregatio de Auxiliis, Cardinal Madruzzi, speaking of Báñez in this connection, said: "His teaching seems to be deduced from the principles of St. Thomas and to flow wholly from St. Thomas's doctrine, although he differs somewhat in his mode of speaking."
