= Tomas de Lemos =

Spanish Dominican theologian (1555–1629)

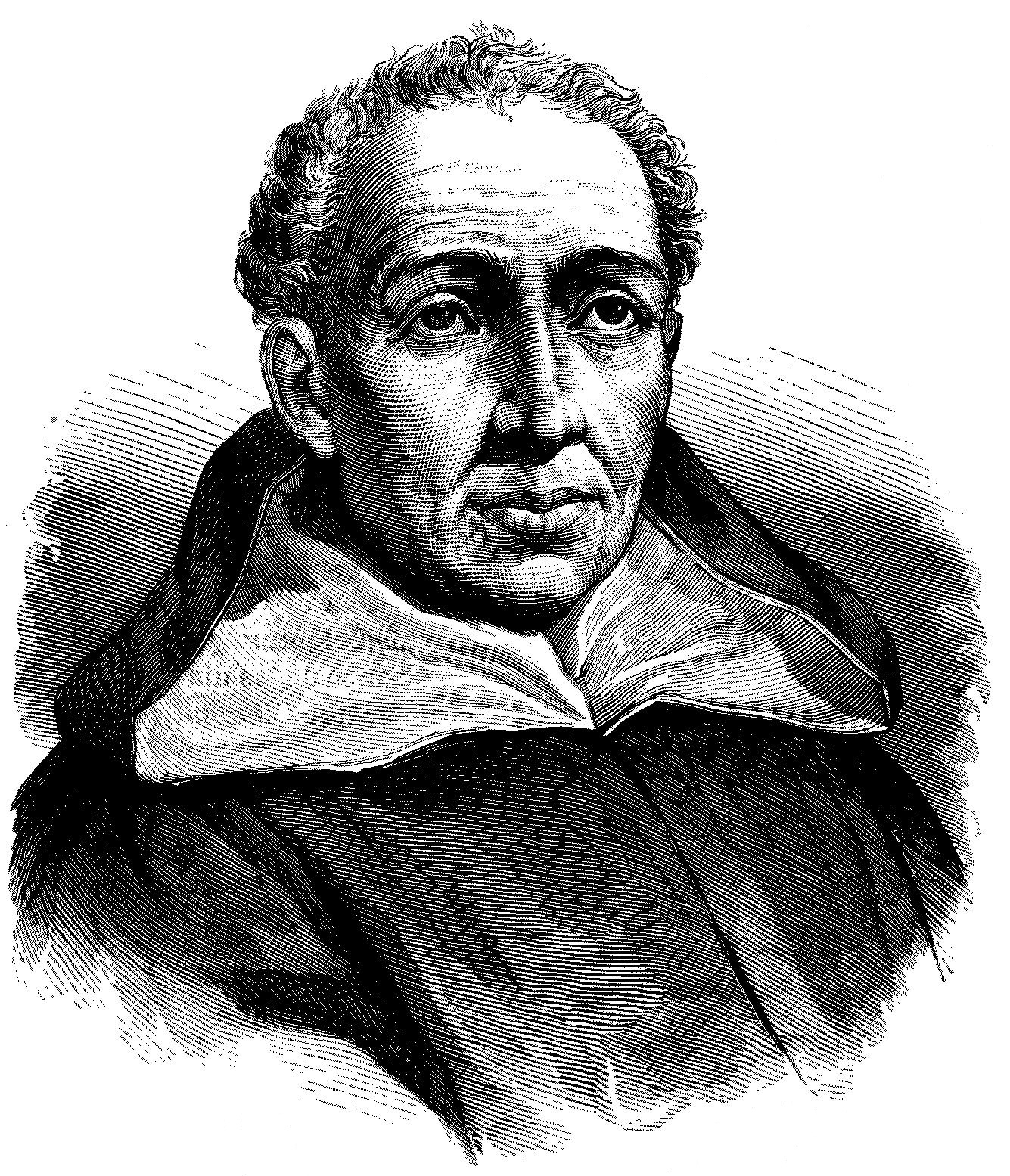

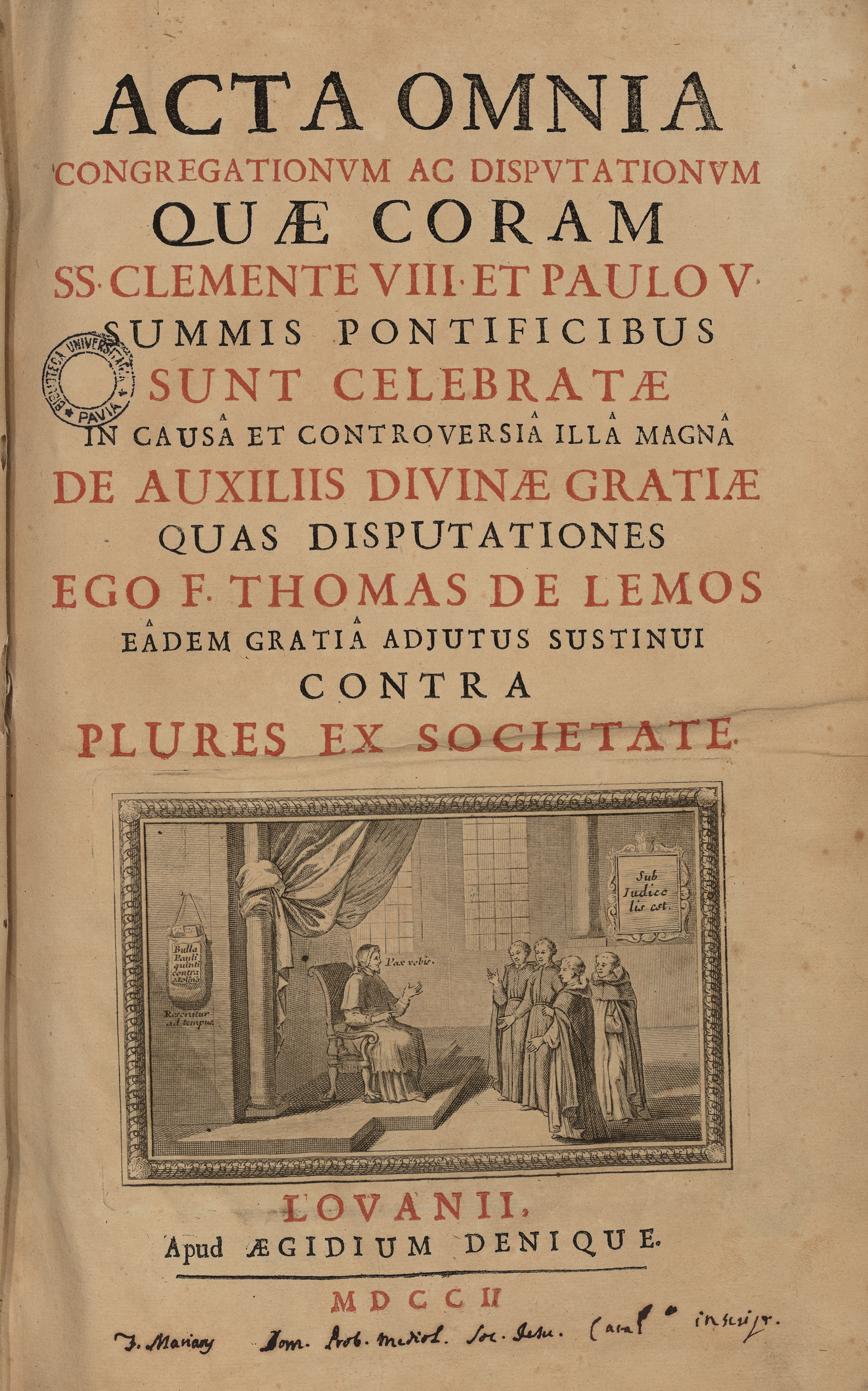
Acta omnia Congregationum ac disputationum, 1702

Tomás de Lemos (Thomas) (Ribadavia, 1555 – Rome, 23 August 1629) was a Spanish Dominican theologian and controversialist.

== Life ==
At an early age he entered the Order of St. Dominic in his native town; he obtained, in 1590 the lectorate in theology and was at the same time appointed regent of studies in the convent of St. Paul at Valladolid. In 1594 he was assigned to the chair of theology in the university of that city.

The intellectual atmosphere of the time was troubled, and theological discussion was rife. The controversy aroused in 1588 by the publication of Luis Molina's work Concordia liberi arbitrii cum gratiae donis, between the Dominicans and Jesuits, had reached a heated and turbulent stage not only at Valladolid but also at Salamanca, Cordoba, Zaragoza, and other cities of Spain. Disputations, both public and private, showed a tendency to drift away from the hitherto universally accepted teaching of Augustine of Hippo and Thomas Aquinas. In 1600 Lemos was chosen to represent his province in the public defence of selected theses before the general chapter of his order held at Naples.

The propositions embraced the doctrine of Thomas Aquinas and his school on grace and free will. In his defence Lemos proved himself as a disputant. No deviation from the works of Augustine would pass him uncorrected; and that he was no less familiar with the writings of Aquinas is evident from his own words:

nec nos in Hispania aliis armis nisi armis S. Thomae incepimus hanc doctrinam impugnare (Acta Congreg., disp. ii, col. 176).

His success prompted the general of his order to send him to Rome to assist his confrere, Diego Alvarez, in defending the teaching of his order against the Molinists before the Congregatio de Auxiliis, established by Pope Clement VIII to settle the controversy.

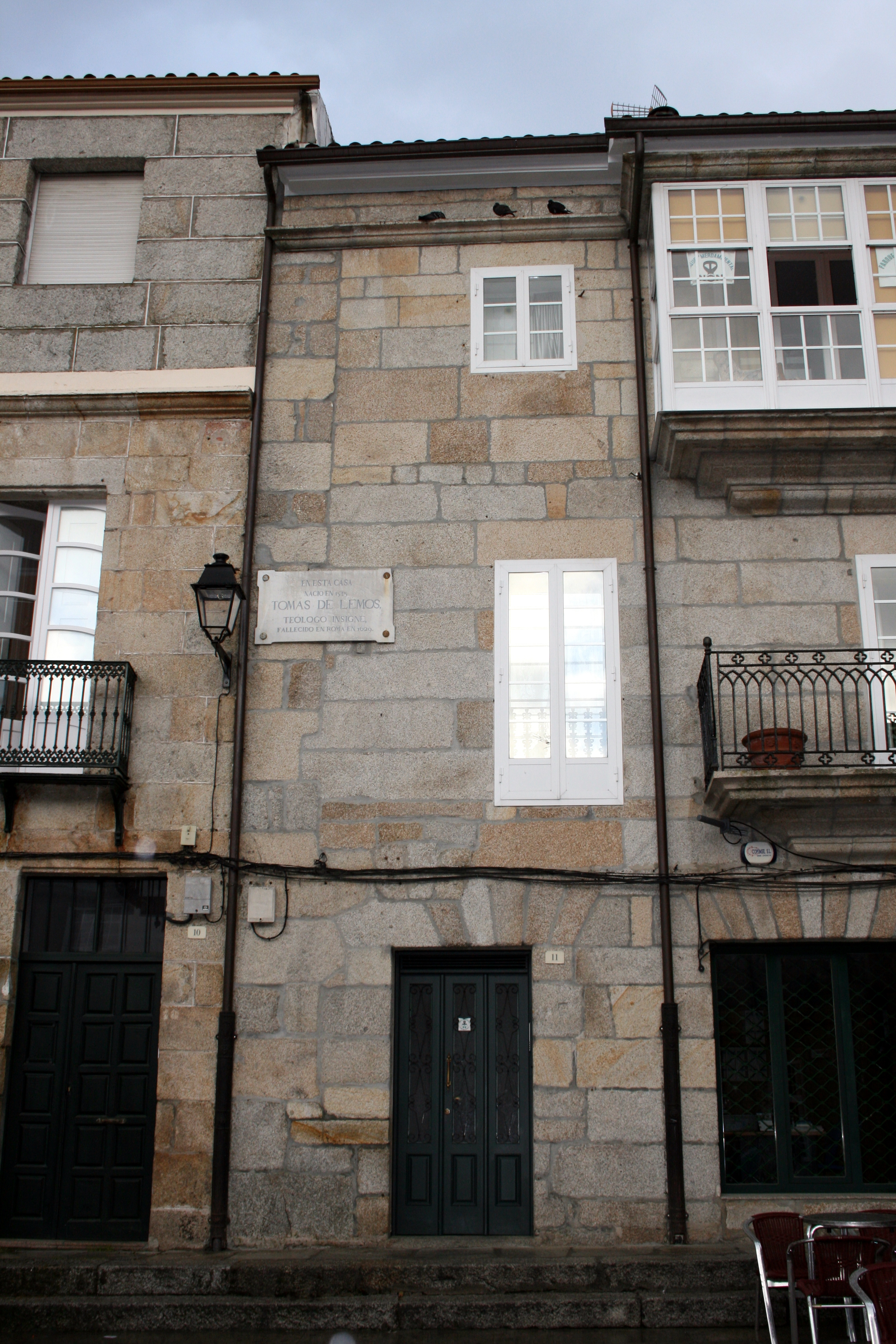
House of Tomas de Lemos Ribadavia, Ourense.

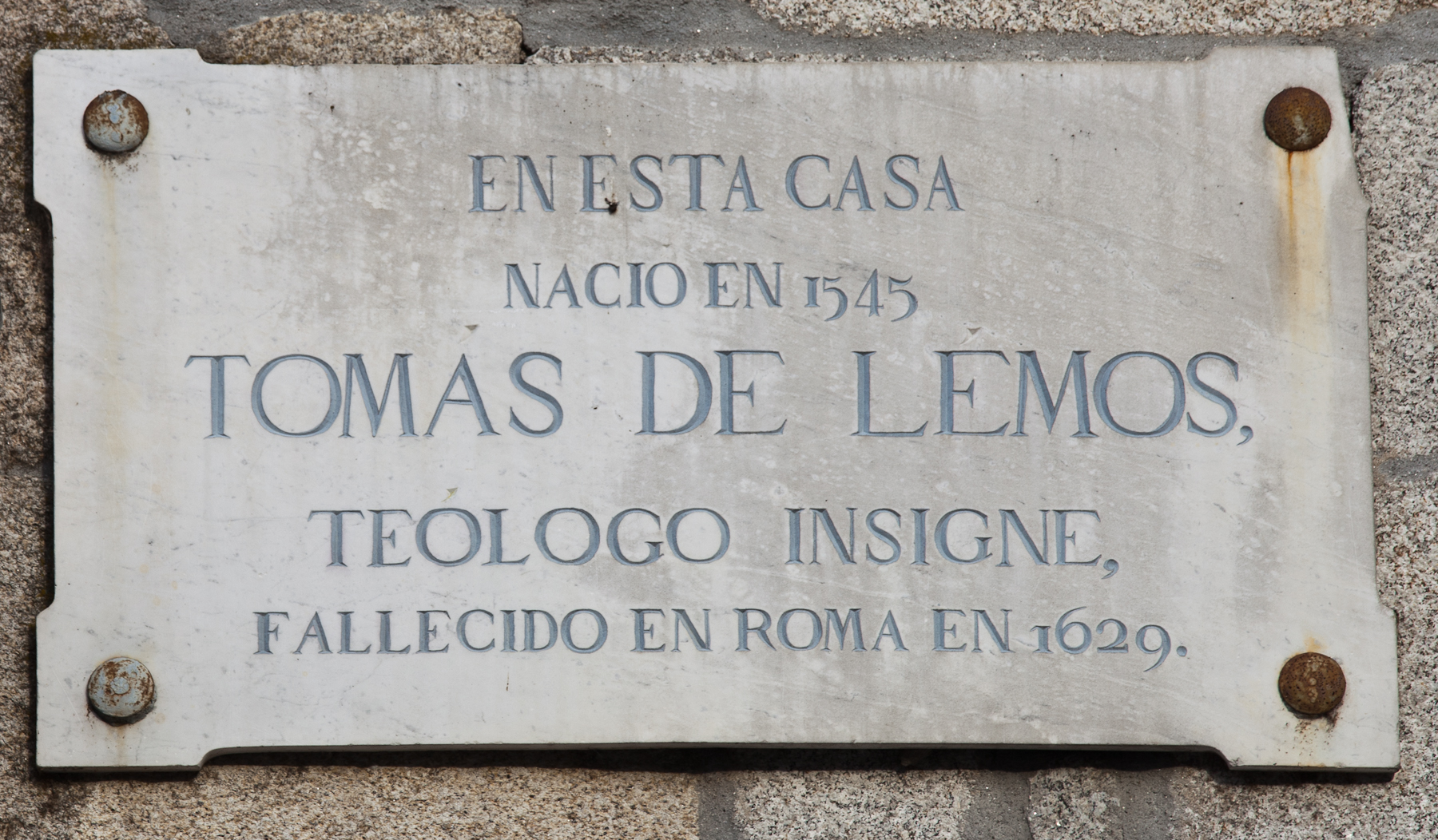
Native house, Ribadavia, Galicia

In the Molinist controversy between Dominicans and Jesuits Lemos was given the responsibility, along with Diego Álvarez, of representing the Dominican Order in debates before Pope Clement VIII and Pope Paul V.

Upon his arrival he was given first place in the defence, which he held till the termination of the Congregation (26 February 1606). For four years, in forty-seven public conferences, in the presence of Clement VIII and Pope Paul V, he defended the teaching of Aquinas with extraordinary skill against five adversaries, the élite of the great Jesuit theologians of the time. Referring to this event he himself writes:

Fuit ista Congregatio celebris, de qua multi mirati sunt, quod tot ac tantis, ubi fecerunt summum proelium patres Societatis, sic ex tempore fuisset responsum. Sed gratia Dei sum id quod sum (Acta Congreg., 1231).

At the conclusion of the commission, Pope Paul V and Philip III of Spain offered him a bishopric, but he declined the honour, preferring to remain in Rome in the convent Sopra Minerva to devote himself to literary work. Three years before his death he became totally blind.

In 1610 Lemos was professor of theology at the College of Saint Thomas, the future Pontifical University of Saint Thomas Aquinas, Angelicum.

== Works ==
While de Lemos wrote a large number of manuscripts, none were published in his lifetime. Two have been published posthumously:

- Panoplia gratia seu de rationalis creaturae in finem supernaturalem gratuita divina suavipotente ordinatione, ductu, mediis, liberoque progressu, dissertationes theologicae (Liège, 1676)
- Acta omnia Congregatioum et disputationum, quae coram SS. Clemente VIII et Panlo V Summis Pontificibus sunt celebratae in causa et controversia illa magna de auxiliis divinae gratiae (Louvain, 1702)
