= William J. Wainwright =

American philosopher

- Born: 1935
- Died: 2020 (aged 84–85)

Philosophical work
- Era: 21st-century philosophy
- Region: Western philosophy
- Institutions: University of Wisconsin

William J. Wainwright (1935-2020) was an American philosopher and Distinguished Professor of Philosophy Emeritus at the University of Wisconsin, Milwaukee. Wainwright served as Editor of Faith and Philosophy for five years and was president of both the Society for Philosophy of Religion and the Society of Christian Philosophers.

== Books ==
- Monotheism and Hope In God (Cambridge University Press, 2020)
- Reason, Revelation, and Devotion: Inference and Argument in Religion (Cambridge University Press, 2015).
