= Marc Murphy =

Marc Murphy may refer to:

- Marc Murphy (footballer) (born 1987), Australian rules footballer
- Marc Murphy (chef) (born 1969), American executive chef

== See also ==
- Mark Murphy (disambiguation)
