= Thomas Senor =

American philosopher

Thomas D. Senor
- Born: 1960 (age 65–66)

Education
- Education: University of Arizona (PhD)

Philosophical work
- Era: 21st-century philosophy
- Region: Western philosophy
- Institutions: University of Arkansas

Thomas D. Senor (born 1960) is an American philosopher and Professor at the University of Arkansas, known for his work on epistemology of memory. He has served as Editor of Faith and Philosophy and is past president of the Southwest Philosophical Society.

== Books ==
- A Critical Introduction to the Epistemology of Memory, New York: Bloomsbury, 2019
- Selected papers in honor of William P. Alston, edited with Michael R. DePaul, Philosophy Documentation Center, 2016
- The Rationality of Belief and the Plurality of Faith: Essays in Honor of William P. Alston (ed.), London: Cornell University Press, 1995
