= Mark C. Murphy =

American philosopher

- Born: 1968 (age 57–58)

Education
- Education: University of Notre Dame (Ph.D., M.A.), University of Texas at Austin (B.A.)

Philosophical work
- Era: 21st-century philosophy
- Region: Western philosophy
- Institutions: Georgetown University

Mark C. Murphy (born 1968) is an American philosopher and professor at the University of Notre Dame, where he is Cathy and Jack Brennan Professor of Virtue Ethics. From 1995-2026, he was at Georgetown University, where he held the Robert L. McDevitt, K.S.G., K.C.H.S. and Catherine H. McDevitt L.C.H.S. Chair in Religious Philosophy. He is known for his work on philosophy of religion. Murphy served as Editor of Faith and Philosophy for five years.

== Books ==
- Natural Law and Practical Rationality (Cambridge, 2001)
- An Essay on Divine Authority (Cornell, 2002)
- Natural Law in Jurisprudence and Politics (Cambridge, 2006)
- Philosophy of Law: The Fundamentals (Blackwell, 2006)
- God and Moral Law: On the Theistic Explanation of Morality (Oxford, 2011)
- God's Own Ethics: Norms of Divine Action and the Argument from Evil (Oxford, 2017)
- Divine Holiness and Divine Action (Oxford, 2021)
- Alasdair MacIntyre (ed.) (Cambridge, 2003)
