= Mark Murphy (author) =

American writer

Mark A. Murphy is an author and contributor to organizational leadership and employee engagement. Murphy has authored or contributed to four books, including Hundred Percenters: Challenge Your Employees to Give it Their All and They'll Give You Even More (a business best-seller in 2010, McGraw-Hill), Generation Y and the New Rules of Management (2008, Insight Publishing), The Deadly Sins of Employee Retention (2005, Leadership IQ Press), and his most recent title, HARD Goals: The Secret to Getting From Where You Are to Where You Want to Be (2010, McGraw-Hill).

Both HARD Goals and Hundred Percenters have received critical acclaim from major media outlets, including The Washington Post, Business Insider, Fortune and others.

Murphy is the founder and CEO of research and consulting firm Leadership IQ, which specializes in leadership training and employee surveys for the private healthcare industry and large and mid-size corporations. As the driving force behind Leadership IQ's research arm, Murphy and his findings are often referenced in business news reports, including CNN Money on "The Fatal mistakes when starting a new job", The Globe and Mail on "Setting career goals: the gender factor" and BusinessWeek on "Why the boss really had to say goodbye."

== Awards ==
Murphy is a three-time nominee for Modern Healthcare's "Most Powerful People in Healthcare Award." Murphy was also awarded the Healthcare Financial Management Association's "Helen Yerger Award for Best Research" for discovering the link between patient mortality rates and hospital finances.
