= Diego Álvarez (theologian) =

Spanish theologian & archbishop (c.1555–1632)

Diego Álvarez, O.P.
- Church: Catholic Church
- See: Archbishop of Trani
- Appointed: 19 March 1607
- Term ended: 10 May 1632
- Predecessor: Juan de Rada
- Successor: Tommaso d'Ancora

Orders
- Consecration: 1 April 1607 (Bishop) by Girolamo Bernerio

Personal details
- Born: c. 1555 Medina de Rioseco, Spain
- Died: 10 May 1632 (aged 76–77) Trani, Kingdom of Naples
- Buried: Trani Cathedral

Diego Álvarez (Latin: Didacus Alvarez; c. 1555 – 1632) was a Spanish theologian who opposed Molinism. He was archbishop of Trani from 1607 to his death.

== Life ==
Diego Álvarez was born at Medina de Rioseco, Old Castile, about 1555. He entered the Dominican Order in his native city, and taught theology for twenty years in the Spanish cities of Burgos, Trianos, Plasencia, and Valladolid, and for ten years (1596-1606) at the Dominican convent of Santa Maria sopra Minerva, in Rome. From 1603 to 1606 he was elected Regent of the Collegium Divi Thomae of the Dominicans in Rome.

Shortly after his arrival in Rome (7 November 1596) he presented to Pope Clement VIII a memorial requesting him to examine the work Concordia liberi Arbitrii, by Luis de Molina, S.J., which, upon its publication in 1588, had given rise to bitter controversy, known as Molinism, on the extent of knowledge of God in the Divine providence. Before the Congregation (Congregatio de Auxiliis), appointed by the Pope to settle the dispute, he defended the Thomistic doctrines of grace, predestination, etc., alone for three years, and, thereafter, conjointly with his confrere Tomas de Lemos, to whom he gave the first place, until the suspension of the Congregation (1606).

He was appointed on 19 March 1607, by Pope Paul V, to the Archbishopric of Trani. The episcopal consecration followed on 1 April in the Basilica of Santa Maria sopra Minerva by the hands of Girolamo Bernerio. He passed the remainder of his life in Trani where he died on 10 May 1632. He was buried in that cathedral.

== Works ==
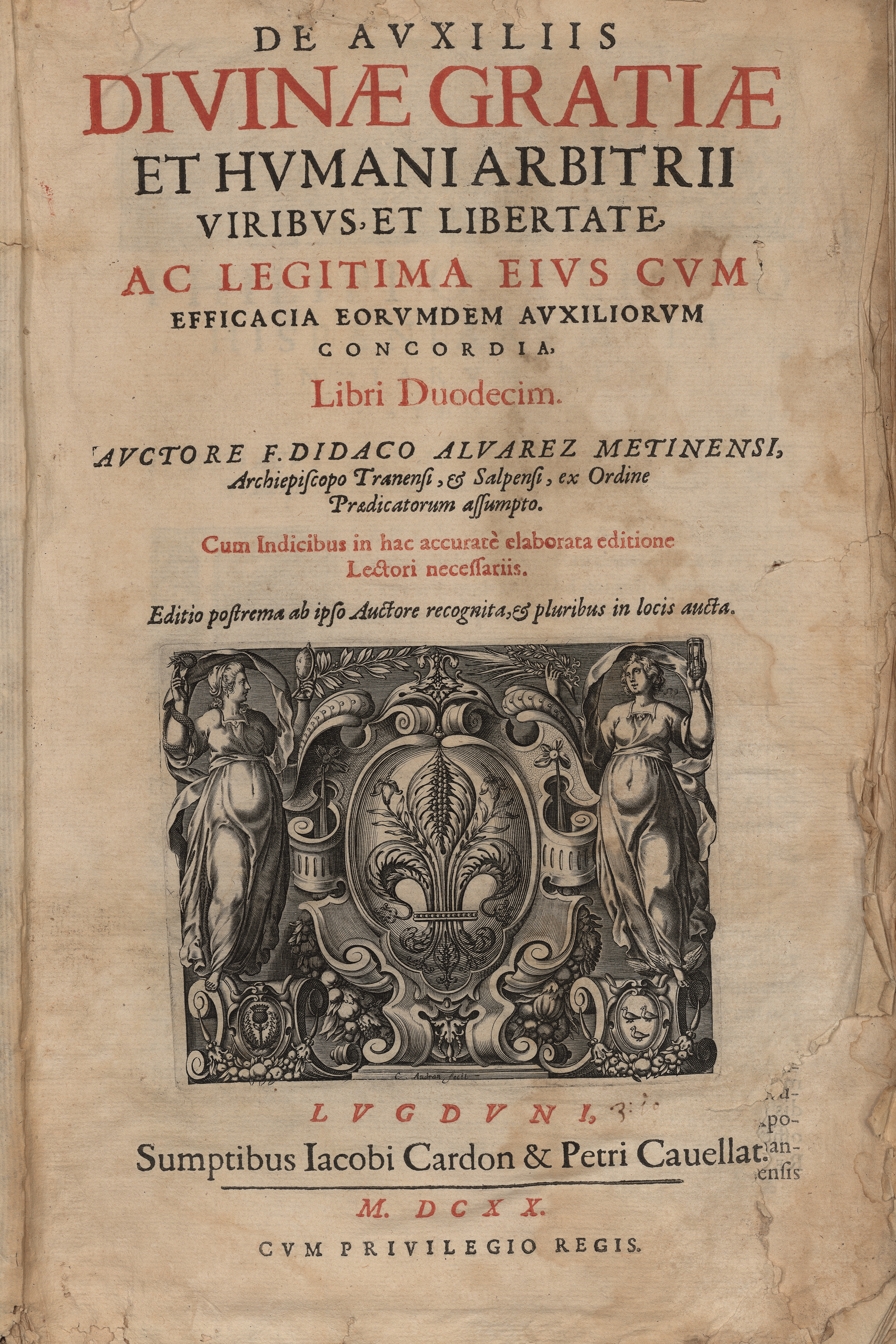
De auxiliis Diuinae Gratiae, 1620

Besides a commentary on Isaiah, and a manual for preachers, Alvarez published:

- De auxiliis divinæ gratiæ et humani arbitrii viribus et libertate, ac legitima ejus cum efficacia eorumdem auxiliorum concordia libri XII (Rome, 1610; Lyons, 1620; Douai, 1635)
- Responsionum ad objectiones adversus concordiam liberi arbitrii cum divina, præscientia, providentia, et prædestinatione, atque cum efficacia prævenientis gratiæ, prout a S. Thoma et Thomistis defenditur et explicatur, Libri IV (Trani, 1622; Lyons, 1622)
- De origine Pelagianæ hæresis et ejus progressu et damnatione per plures summos pontifices et concilia facta Historia ex annalibus Card. Baronii et aliis probatis auctoribus collecta (Trani, 1629)
- Responsionum liber ultimus hoc titulo: Opus præclarum nunquam hactenus editum, in quo argumentis validissimis concordia liberi arbitrii cum divina præscientia, prædestinatione, et efficacia gratiæ prævenientis ad mentem S. Thomæ et omnium defenditur et explicatur (Douai, 1635)
- Operis de auxiliis divinæ gratiæ et humani arbitrii viribus et libertate, ac legitima ejus cum efficaciæ eorumdem auxiliorum concordia summa, in IV libros distincta (Lyons, 1620; Cologne, 1621; Trani, 1625)
- De incarnatione divini verbi disputationes LXXX; in quibus explicantur et defenduntur, quæ in tertia parte summæ theologicæ docet S. Thomas a Q. 1 ad 24 (Lyons, 1614; Rome, 1615; Cologne, 1622)
- Disputationes theologicæ in primam secundæ S. Thomæ, in quibus præcipua omina quæ adversus doctrinam ejusdem et communem Thomistarum a diversis auctoribus impugnantur, juxta legitimum sensum præceptoris angelici explicantur et defenduntur (Trani, 1617; Cologne, 1621)

Catholic Church titles
Preceded by Juan de Rada	Archbishop of Trani; 1607–1632	Succeeded by Tommaso d'Ancora
