= Jonathan Kvanvig =

American philosopher (born 1954)

Jonathan Lee Kvanvig (born December 7, 1954) is Professor of Philosophy at Washington University in St. Louis.

Kvanvig has published extensively in areas such as epistemology, philosophy of religion, logic, and philosophy of language. Some of his books include Rationality and Reflection, The Value of Knowledge and the Pursuit of Understanding, and The Problem of Hell (published 1993), which debates Hell in a modern theological and philosophical way.

Up until 2019, he was the owner and administrator of the blog Certain Doubts, which covered topics related to epistemology.

== Selected bibliography ==
- Religious Disagreement and Pluralism, ed. with Matthew A. Benton, Oxford: Oxford University Press, 2022.
- Depicting Deity: A Metatheological Approach, Oxford: Oxford University Press, 2021.
- Faith and Humility, Oxford: Oxford University Press, 2018. (Paperback edition 2021.)
- Rationality and Reflection: How to Think about What to Think, Oxford: Oxford University Press, 2014. (Paperback edition 2017.)
- Destiny and Deliberation: Essays in Philosophical Theology, Oxford: Oxford University Press, 2011. (Paperback edition 2013.)
- Oxford Studies in Philosophy of Religion, ed., Volume 1, Oxford: Oxford University Press, 2008. (Contributors: Kvanvig, Finch & Rea, Fischer, Frances, Hajek, Koons, O'Connor, Pruss, Senor, Stump, van Inwagen, Zagzebski)
- The Knowability Paradox, Oxford: Oxford University Press, 2006. (Paperback Edition 2008).
- The Value of Knowledge and the Pursuit of Understanding, New York: Cambridge University Press, 2003. (Paperback Edition 2007; Chapter One reprinted in Duncan Pritchard and Ram Neta, eds., Arguing About Knowledge, London: Routledge, 2008.)
- Warrant in Contemporary Epistemology: Essays in Honor of Plantinga's Theory of Knowledge, ed., Savage, MD: Rowman & Littlefield, 1996. (Contributors: Kvanvig, BonJour, Conee, Feldman, Foley, Klein, Kvanvig, Lehrer, Lycan, Markie, Pappas, Plantinga, Sosa, Swain, van Fraassen).
- The Problem of Hell, New York: Oxford University Press, ISBN 978-0-19-508487-0, 1993.
- The Intellectual Virtues and the Life of the Mind: On the Place of the Virtues in Contemporary Epistemology, in the Studies in Epistemology and Cognitive Theory Series, Paul K. Moser, general editor, Savage, MD: Rowman & Littlefield, 1992.
- The Possibility of an All-Knowing God, London: Macmillan Press Ltd., Library of Philosophy and Religion, John Hick, general editor, 1986, and New York: St. Martin's Press, 1986.
