= Congregatio de Auxiliis =

Commission established by Pope Clement VIII

The Congregatio de Auxiliis (Latin for "Congregation on help [by Divine Grace]") was a commission established by Pope Clement VIII to settle a theological controversy regarding divine grace that had arisen between the Dominicans and the Jesuits towards the close of the sixteenth century.

== Context of the dispute ==
The principal question, giving its name to the whole dispute, concerned the help (auxilia) afforded by grace; the crucial point was the reconciliation of the efficacy of divine grace with human freedom. Catholic theology holds on the one hand that the efficacious grace given for the performance of an action obtains, infallibly, man's consent and that action takes place; on the other hand that, in so acting, man is free. Hence the question: How can these two—the infallible result and liberty—be harmonized?

The Dominicans solved the difficulty by their theory of physical premotion and predetermination; grace is efficacious when, in addition to the assistance necessary for an action, it gives a physical impulsion by means of which God determines and applies our faculties to the action. The Jesuits found the explanation in that middle knowledge (scientia media) whereby God knows, in the objective reality of things, what a man, in any circumstances in which he might be placed, would do. Foreseeing, for instance, that a man would correspond freely with grace A, and that he, freely, would not correspond with grace B, God, desirous of man's conversion, gives him grace A. This is efficacious grace. The Dominicans declared that the Jesuits conceded too much to free will, and so tended toward Pelagianism. In turn, the Jesuits complained that the Dominicans did not sufficiently safeguard human liberty, and seemed in consequence to lean towards Calvinism.

== Beginning of the controversy ==
The controversy is usually considered to have begun in the year 1581, when the Jesuit Prudencio de Montemayor defended certain theses on grace that had been vigorously attacked by the Dominican Domingo Bañez. That this debate took place is certain, but the text of the Jesuit's theses have never been published. As to those reported to the Inquisition, neither Montemayer nor any other Jesuit ever acknowledged them as his. The controversy went on for six years, passing through three phases—in Leuven, in Spain and in Rome.

The University of Leuven was the home of Michel Baius, whose propositions were condemned by the Church. The Jesuit (afterwards Cardinal) Francisco de Toledo, authorized by Gregory XIII, had obliged Baius, in 1580, to retract his errors in presence of the entire university. Baius thereupon conceived a deep aversion for the Jesuits and determined to have revenge. During Lent of 1587, he and some of his colleagues extracted from the notebooks of certain students who were disciples of the Jesuits, thirty-four propositions, many of them plainly erroneous, and asked the university to condemn "these Jesuit doctrines". Learning of this scheme, Leonard Lessius, the most distinguished theologian of the Society in the Low Countries and the special object of Baius's attacks, drew up another list of thirty-four propositions containing the genuine doctrine of the Jesuits. He presented them to the dean of the university, and asked for a hearing before some of the professors to show how different his teaching was from that ascribed to him. The request was not granted.

The university published, on 9 September 1587, a condemnation of the first thirty-four propositions. At once, throughout Belgium, the Jesuits were called heretics and Lutherans. The university urged the bishops of the Low Countries and the other universities to endorse the censure, and this in fact was done by some of the prelates and in particular the University of Douai. In view of these measures, the Belgian provincial of the Society, Francis Coster, issued a protest against the action of those who, without letting the Jesuits be heard, accused them of heresy. Lessius also published a statement to the effect that the university professors had misrepresented the Jesuit doctrine. The professors replied with warmth. To clear up the issues Lessius, at the insistence of the Archbishop of Mechelen, formulated six antitheses, brief statements, embodying the doctrine of the Jesuits relative to the matter of the condemned propositions, the third and fourth antithesis bearing upon the main problem, i.e., efficacious grace.

The discussion was kept up on both sides for a year longer, until the papal nuncio succeeded in softening its asperities. He reminded the contestants that definitive judgment in such matters belonged to the Holy See, and he forwarded to Sixtus V the principal publications of both parties with a petition for a final decision. This, however, was not rendered; a controversy on the same lines had been started at Salamanca, and attention now centered on Spain, where the two discussions were merged into one.

== Publication of Molina's work ==
In 1588 the Spanish Jesuit Luis de Molina published at Lisbon his Concordia liberi arbitrii cum gratiæ donis, in which he explained efficacious grace on the basis of scientia media. Bañez, the Dominican professor at Salamanca, informed the Archduke Albert, the Habsburg Viceroy of Portugal, that the work contained thirteen certain provisions that the Spanish Inquisition had censured. The archduke forbade the sale of the book and sent a copy to Salamanca. Bañez examined it and reported to the archduke that, out of the thirteen propositions, nine were held by Molina and that in consequence the book ought not to be circulated. He also noted the passages that, as he thought, contained the errors. Albert referred his comments to Molina, who drew up the rejoinder. As the book had been approved by the Inquisition in Portugal, and its sale permitted by the Councils of Portugal and of Castille and Aragon, it was thought proper to print at the end the replies of Molina; with these the work appeared in 1589. The Dominicans attacked it, on the grounds that Molina and all the Jesuits denied efficacious grace. The latter replied that such a denial was impossible on the part of any Catholic. What the Jesuits attacked was the Dominican theory of predetermination, which they regarded as incompatible with human freedom.

The debates continued for five years and in 1594 became public and turbulent at Valladolid, where the Jesuit Antonio de Padilla and the Dominican Diego Nuño defended their respective positions. Similar encounters took place at Salamanca, Zaragoza, Córdoba and other Spanish cities. In view of the disturbances thus created, Pope Clement VIII took the matter into his own hands and ordered both parties to refrain from further discussion and await the decision of the Apostolic See.

The pope then asked for an expression of opinion from various universities and distinguished theologians of Spain. Between 1594 and 1597, twelve reports were submitted; by the three universities of Salamanca, Alcalà and Sigüenza; by the bishops of Coria, Segovia, Plasencia, Cartagena and Mondoñedo; by Serra, Miguel Salon (Augustinian Friar), Castro (Canon of Toledo), and Luis Coloma, Prior of the Augustinians at Valladolid. There were also forwarded to Rome some statements in explanation and defense of the Jesuit and of the Dominican theories. Clement VIII appointed a commission under the presidency of Cardinals Madrucci (Secretary of the Inquisition) and Aragone, which began its labours on 2 January 1598 and on 19 March handed in the result condemning Molina's book. Displeased at their haste in treating a question of such importance, the Pope ordered them to go over the work again, keeping in view the documents sent from Spain.

Though the examination of these would have required several years, the commission reported again in November and insisted on the condemnation of Molina. Thereupon Clement VIII ordered the generals of the Dominicans and the Jesuits, respectively, to appear with some of their theologians before the commission, explain their doctrines, and settle their differences. In obedience to this command, both generals began (22 February 1599) before the commission a series of conferences, which lasted through that year. Bellarmine, created cardinal in March, was admitted to the sessions. Little, however, was accomplished, with the Dominicans aiming at criticism of Molina rather than exposition of their own views. The death of Cardinal Madrucci interrupted these conferences, and Clement VIII, seeing that no solution was to be reached on these lines, determined to have the matter discussed in his presence. At the first debate, on 19 March 1602, the pope presided, with Cardinal Borghese (later Paul V) and Aragone assisting, as well as the members of the former commission and various theologians summoned by the pope. Sixty-eight sessions were thus held (1602–1605).

== Conclusion ==
Cardinal Bellarmine predicted that the issue would never be resolved, and suggested it would be more appropriate to summon an ecumenical council to deal with the question. Absent a council, he warned Pope Clement that he should not pronounce on it, the matter being of too great import and consequence, particularly since His Holiness was not himself a theologian. Upon being told that the Pope desired and indeed planned to issue a decision (almost certainly meaning condemnation of the Molinists), Bellarmine confidently declared he would not, stating, "He will not define it. If he would like to try this, I say that he will die first." His assurance surprised Cardinal del Monte, as the Pope at the time was in good health.

Clement VIII died on 5 March 1605, and, after the brief reign of Leo XI, Paul V ascended the papal throne. In his presence, seventeen debates took place. The Dominicans were represented by Diego Alvarez and Tomas de Lemos, both professors at the Roman College of Saint Thomas; the Jesuits by Gregorio de Valencia, Pedro de Arrubal, Fernando de Bastida and Juan de Salas. Francis de Sales was one of the theologians consulted by the pope; according to Eunan McDonnell, the moratorium ordered by the pope was in keeping with Francis' stance.

So, after twenty years of public and private discussion, and eighty-five conferences in the presence of the popes, the question was not solved but an end was put to the disputes. The pope's decree communicated on 5 September 1607 to both Dominicans and Jesuits allowed each party to defend its own doctrine, enjoined each from censoring or condemning the opposite opinion, and commanded them to await, as loyal sons of the Church, the final decision of the Apostolic See. That decision, however, was not reached, and both orders, consequently, could maintain their respective theories, just as any other theological opinion is held. The long controversy aroused considerable feeling, and the pope, aiming at the restoration of peace and charity between the religious orders, forbade by a decree of the Inquisition (1 December 1611) the publication of any book concerning efficacious grace until further action by the Holy See. The prohibition remained in force during the greater part of the seventeenth century, although it was widely circumvented by the means of explicit commentaries of Thomas Aquinas.

One of those who essayed a novel solution to the problem was Bernard Lonergan, SJ, who interpreted Summa Theologiae 1-2, q. 111, a. 2, and took a distance from both the Molinist and the Bañezian positions.

== See also ==
- Augustine of Hippo
- Formulary controversy (between Jesuits and Jansenists)
- Thomism
