= Thomas P. Flint =

American philosopher

- Born: 1954 (age 71–72)

Education
- Education: University of Notre Dame (PhD)

Philosophical work
- Era: 21st-century philosophy
- Region: Western philosophy
- Institutions: University of Notre Dame
- Notable ideas: Molinism

Thomas Flint (born 1954) is an American philosopher and Professor Emeritus of Philosophy at the University of Notre Dame, known for his work on philosophy of religion. He served as Editor of Faith and Philosophy for eight years and was the Director of the Notre Dame Center for Philosophy of Religion for six years, after having served as Associate Director for 18 years, during Alvin Plantinga’s time as Director.

== Books ==
- Thomas P. Flint and Michael C. Rea (eds.), The Oxford Handbook of Philosophical Theology, Oxford University Press, 2009
- Divine Providence: The Molinist Account [Cornell Studies in the Philosophy of Religion]. Ithaca, NY and London: Cornell University Press, 1998
- Christian Philosophy (ed.), Indiana: University of Notre Dame Press, 1990
