= Irresistible grace =

Calvinist theological doctrine

Irresistible grace (also called effectual grace, effectual calling, or efficacious grace) is a doctrine in Christian theology particularly associated with Calvinism, which teaches that the saving grace of God is effectually applied to those whom he has determined to save (the elect) and, in God's timing, overcomes their resistance to obeying the call of the gospel, bringing them to faith in Christ. It is to be distinguished from prevenient grace, particularly associated with Arminianism, which teaches that the offer of salvation through grace does not act irresistibly in a purely cause-effect, deterministic method, but rather in an influence-and-response fashion that can be both freely accepted and freely denied.

== The doctrine ==
Some claim that fourth-century Church Father Augustine of Hippo taught that God grants those whom he chooses for salvation the gift of persevering grace, and that they could not conceivably fall away. This doctrine gave rise to the doctrine of irresistible grace (gratia irresistibilis), though the term was not used during Augustine's lifetime.

According to Calvinism, those who obtain salvation do so, not by their own "free" will, but because of the sovereign grace of God. That is, men yield to grace, not finally because their consciences were more tender or their faith more tenacious than that of other men. Rather, the willingness and ability to do God's will are evidence of God's own faithfulness to save men from the power and the penalty of sin, and since man is dead in sin and a slave to it, he cannot decide or be wooed to follow after God: God must powerfully intervene by giving him life and irresistibly drawing the sinner to himself. In short, Calvinism argues that regeneration must precede faith. In contrast, Arminianism argues that God’s grace through Jesus Christ stirs up a willingness to know God and respond to the gospel before regeneration; it is how God intervenes that separates Calvinism from Arminianism.

Calvin says of this intervention that "it is not violent, so as to compel men by external force; but still it is a powerful impulse of the Holy Spirit, which makes men willing who formerly were unwilling and reluctant." Despite the denial by Calvin and within the Calvinist confessions John Gill says that "this act of drawing is an act of power, yet not of force; God in drawing of unwilling, makes willing in the day of His power: He enlightens the understanding, bends the will, gives an heart of flesh, sweetly allures by the power of His grace, and engages the soul to come to Christ, and give up itself to Him; he draws with the bands of love. Drawing, though it supposes power and influence, yet not always coaction and force: music draws the ear, love the heart, and pleasure the mind."

=== Objections to the doctrine ===
==== Arminian ====
Christians associated with Arminianism, such as John Wesley and part of the Methodist movement, reject this Calvinist doctrine. They believe that as Adam and Eve were free to choose between right and wrong, humanity is able, as a result of the prevenient or preceding grace of God through Jesus Christ, to choose to turn from sin to righteousness and believe on Jesus Christ who draws all of humanity to himself. And I, if I be lifted up from the earth, will draw all men unto me.^{John 12:32} In this view, (1) after God's universal dispensation of grace to mankind, the will of man, which was formerly adverse to God and unable to obey, can now choose to obey through the work of Christ; and (2) although God's grace is a strong initial catalyst to effect salvation, it is not irresistible but may be ultimately resisted and rejected by a human being.

Both Calvinism and Arminianism agree that the question of the resistibility of grace is inexorably bound up with the theological system's view of the sovereignty of God. The fundamental question is whether God can allow individuals to accept or reject his grace and yet remain sovereign. If so, then grace can be resistible. If not, then grace must be irresistible.

This different understanding of sovereignty is often attributed to an improper understanding of total depravity. However, both Calvin and Arminius taught total depravity. Total depravity is expressly affirmed in Article III of the Five articles of Remonstrance. Nevertheless, Calvinist Charles Hodge says, "The (Arminian) and (Roman Catholic) doctrine is true, if the other parts of their doctrinal system are true; and it is false if that system be erroneous. If the (Calvinistic) doctrine concerning the natural state of man since the fall, and the sovereignty of God in election, be Scriptural, then it is certain that sufficient grace does not become efficacious from the cooperation of the human will." Hodge's argument follows Calvinist teaching which denies that the work of Jesus Christ empowers humanity to respond to the gospel before regeneration.

Calvinism's rejection of prevenient grace leaves humanity in a state of Total Depravity which requires regeneration of an individual before that individual is capable to believe or repent. John the Baptist called all to his baptism for the remission of sins^{Mark 1:4} and multitudes responded without regeneration.^{Mark 1:5} The New Testament regularly calls individuals to repent and believe with no indication that they had been previously regenerated. The Apostle Peter called the Jews to repent and be converted.^{Acts 3:19} Jesus promised that the Holy Spirit would convict the world of sin.^{John 16:8} Calvinism's response is found in Limited Atonement. So as a result of the Calvinist understanding of God's sovereignty, one must conclude that God's election does not depend upon any human response, necessitating a belief in (1) both Total Depravity and Unconditional Election, (2) Irresistible Grace rather than Prevenient Grace, and (3) Limited Atonement; if any of these beliefs are rejected, this logic fails.

==== Lutheran ====
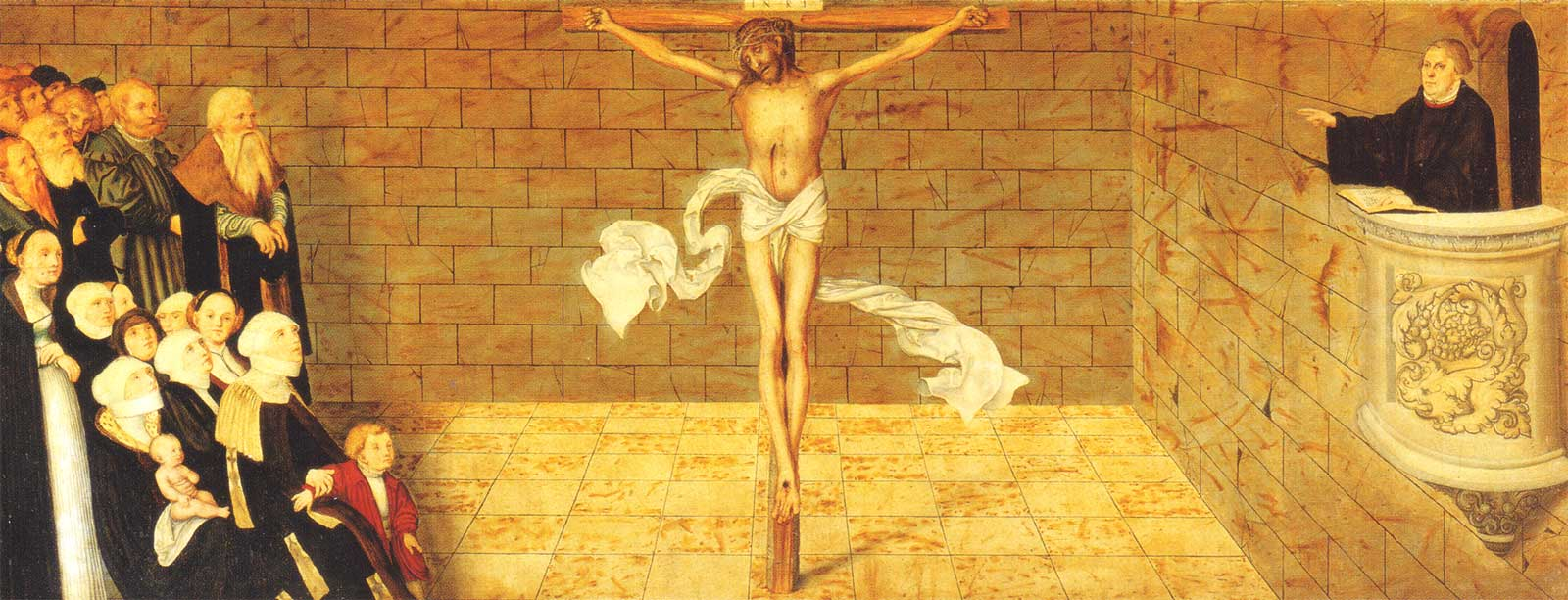
"The certain mark by which a Christian community can be recognized is the preaching of the gospel in its purity."—Luther

Like Calvinists, Lutherans view the work of salvation as monergistic in which an unconverted or unrepentant person always resists and rejects God and his ways. Even during conversion, the Formula of Concord says, humans resist "the Word and will of God, until God awakens him from the death of sin, enlightens and renews him." Furthermore, they both see the preaching of the gospel as a means of grace by which God offers salvation.

Calvinists distinguish between a resistible, outward call to salvation given to all who hear the free offer of the gospel, and an efficacious, inward work by the Holy Spirit. Every person is unwilling to follow the outward call to salvation until, as the Westminster Confession puts it, "being quickened and renewed by the Holy Spirit, he is thereby enabled to answer this call, and to embrace the grace offered and conveyed by it." Once inwardly renewed, every person freely follows God and his ways as "not only the obligatory but the preferable good," and hence that special renewing grace is always effective.

Contrary to the Calvinist position, Lutherans hold that whenever the Holy Spirit works outwardly through the Word and sacraments, it always acts inwardly through them as well. Unlike Calvinists, Lutherans believe the Holy Spirit always works efficaciously. The Word heard by those that resist it is just as efficacious as the Word preached to those that convert. The Formula of Concord teaches that when humans reject the calling of the Holy Spirit, it is not a result of the Word being less efficacious. Instead, contempt for the means of grace is the result of "the perverse will of man, which rejects or perverts the means and instrument of the Holy Ghost, which God offers him through the call, and resists the Holy Ghost, who wishes to be efficacious, and works through the Word..."

Lutherans are certain that the work of the Holy Spirit does not occur merely alongside the means of grace to regenerate, but instead is an integral part of them, always working through them wherever they are found. Lutherans teach that the Holy Spirit limits itself to working only through the means of grace and nowhere else, so that those who reject the means of grace are simultaneously resisting and rejecting the Holy Spirit and the grace it brings.

=== Biblical passages related to the doctrine ===
The statement of St. Paul is said to confirm that those whom God effectually calls necessarily come to full salvation: "(T)hose whom (God) predestined He also called, and those whom He called He also justified, and those whom He justified He also glorified" (Romans 8:28, 30). Of course, this confirmation depends upon the belief that when God elected certain individuals for salvation, He either did not know or did not consider who would respond and obey, though the Apostle Peter refers to the "Elect according to the foreknowledge of God the Father, through sanctification of the Spirit, unto obedience and sprinkling of the blood of Jesus Christ".^{1 Peter 1:2}

Calvinists also rely upon several verses from the sixth chapter of the Gospel of John, which contains a record of Jesus' teaching on humanity's abilities and God's activities in salvation, as the central proof text for the Calvinist doctrine:

- John 6:37, 39: "All that the Father gives me will come to me.... And this is the will of Him who sent me, that I should lose nothing of all that He has given me, but raise it up on the last day."[ESV]
- John 6:44–45: "No one can come to me unless the Father who sent me draws him.... Everyone who has heard and learned from the Father comes to me."[ESV]
- John 6:65: "(N)o one can come to me unless it is granted him by the Father."[ESV]

Proponents of Arminianism argue that the word "draw" (Greek: ἕλκω, helkô) as used in John 6:44 does not require the sense of "drag", though Calvinists teach this is the word's usual meaning (as in Jn. 18:10; 21:6; 21:11; Acts 16:19; 21:30; Jas. 2:6). They point to John 12:32 as an example: "And I, when I am lifted up from the earth, will draw all people to myself." Many Arminians interpret this to mean that Jesus draws all people to Himself, but the draw only enables people to come to Him, since, if the call was truly irresistible, then all must come to Christ and be saved. They may also note that in the Septuagint version of Jeremiah 38:13, when Jeremiah is lifted out of the pit where he was left to die, this Greek verb is used for the action which his rescuers performed after he voluntarily secured the ropes under his armpits, and that this rescue was performed in cooperation with Jeremiah's wishes and would have failed if he did not cooperate. Therefore, they may argue, even if the semantics of "draw" are understood in the usual sense, this should only be taken to indicate the source of the power, not the question of whether the person being drawn responds to the drawing, or to indicate that the drawing is done irrespective of their will.

Calvinists argue that (1) the word "draw" should be understood according to its usual semantics in both John 6:44 and 12:32; (2) the word "all" (translated "all people" in verse 12:32) should be taken in the sense of "all kinds of people" rather than "every individual"; and thus (3) the former verse refers to an irresistible internal call to salvation and the latter to the opening of the Kingdom of God to the Gentiles, not a universal, resistible internal call. The argument requires acceptance of either the doctrine of Limited Atonement or universalism, since John 12:32 states that "Jesus will draw all". Some have asserted on this basis that the text of John 6:44 can entail either universalism or Calvinism (inclusive of Limited Atonement), but not Arminianism.

Arminian William Barclay argues that "man's resistance can defeat the pull of God" mentioned in John 6:44, but commentator Leon Morris contends that "(n)ot one of (Barclay's) examples of the verb ('draw') shows the resistance as successful. Indeed we can go further. There is not one example in the New Testament of the use of this verb where the resistance is successful. Always the drawing power is triumphant, as here." Such arguments invite the criticism that Calvinists teach salvation by decree of God rather than justification by faith alone, that they "so zealously sought to guard the free grace of God in salvation that they denied faith any involvement at all in the actual justification of sinners." But even if the drawing power is always triumphant, the ability to resist does not depend upon the meaning of the word "draw" in John 12:32, but on the question what the "draw" is intended to accomplish. Calvinism assumes that persons who Jesus "draws" will be regenerated. Arminianism states that all are drawn to Jesus to be given an enabling grace. "Jesus does not define what 'His drawing' will accomplish in John 12, only that He will do it." Even if the semantics of "draw" are understood in the manner Calvinist's urge, this should only be taken to indicate the sufficiency of the power to draw (they were "not able to draw" as in John 21:6, or they were able to do so as in John 21:11), rather than to define what God does to those He draws. Arminians reject the Calvinist teaching that God draws for the purpose of forced regeneration irrespective of their wishes. Rather Arminians believe God draws all persons to provide all with an ability or enabling to believe, as prevenient grace teaches.

== History of the doctrine ==
In the Catholic Church, debates concerning the respective role of efficacious grace and free will led to the establishment of the Congregatio de Auxiliis at the end of the 16th century by the Pope Clement VIII. The Dominicans insisted on the role of the efficacious grace, but the Jesuits embraced Molinism, which postulated greater liberty in the will. These debates also led to the famous formulary controversy in France which pitted the Jansenists against the Jesuits.

The doctrine is one of the so-called Five points of Calvinism that were defined at the Synod of Dort during the Quinquarticular Controversy with the Arminian Remonstrants, who objected to the general predestinarian scheme of Calvinism, rejecting its denial of free will and its condemnation of the "majority of humanity for the sole purpose of torturing them in hell for all of eternity, and that they never had a choice". In Calvinist churches, the doctrine is most often mentioned in comparisons with other salvific schemes and their respective doctrines about the state of mankind after the Fall, and it is not a common topic for sermons or studies otherwise.

== See also ==
- Jansenism
- Justification
- Prevenient grace
- Total depravity
