= Divine providence =

God's intervention in the universe

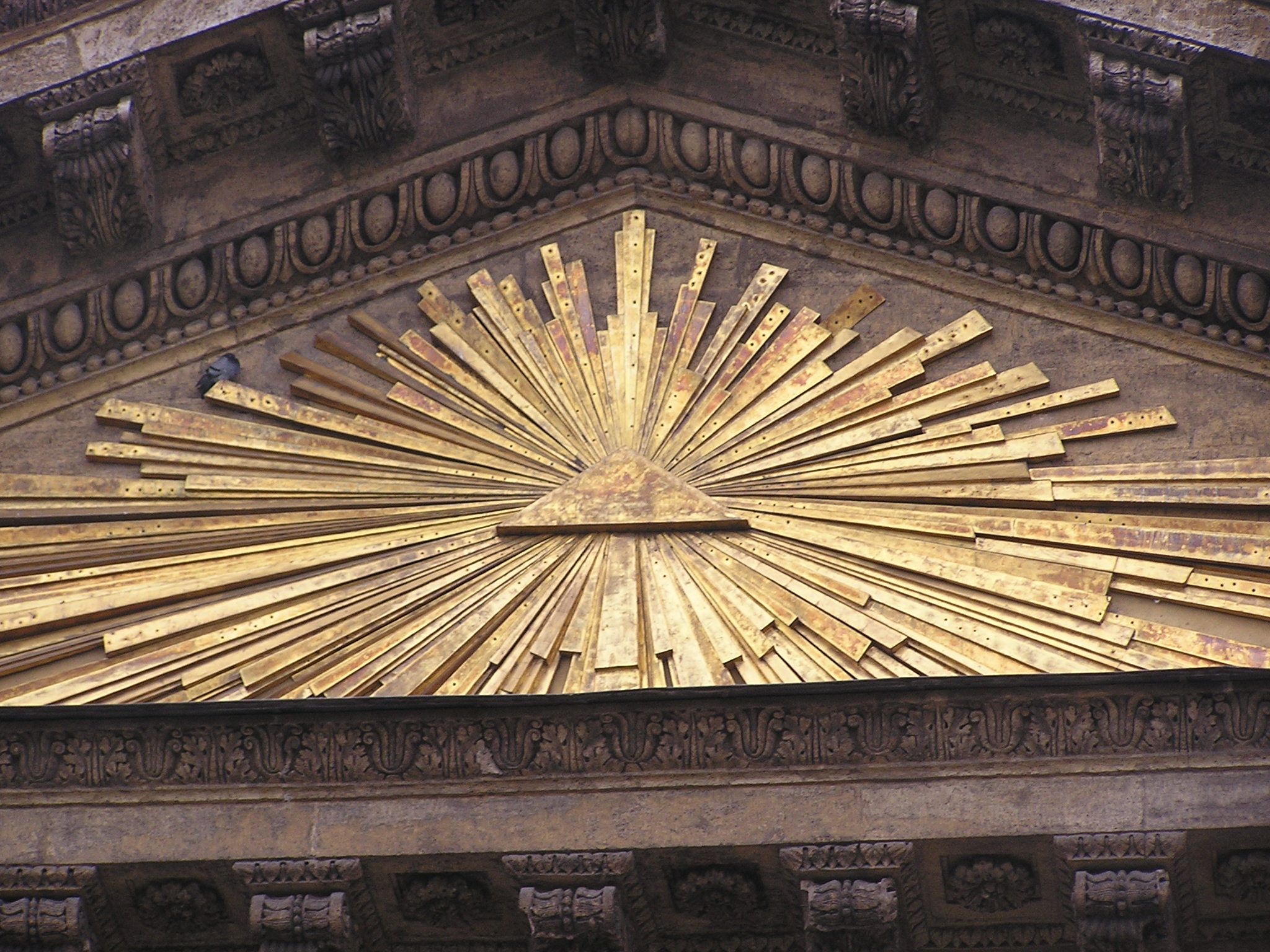
Sculpture of the Eye of Providence in the relief of the Kazan Cathedral, Saint Petersburg

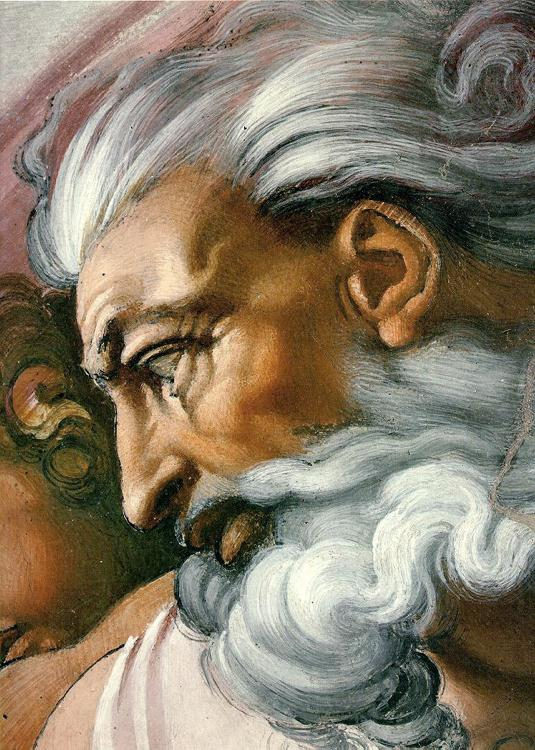
Michelangelo's painting

In theology, divine providence, or simply providence, is God's intervention in the universe. The term Divine Providence (usually capitalized) is also used as a title of God. A distinction is usually made between "general providence", which refers to God's continuous upholding of the existence and natural order of the universe, and "special providence", which refers to God's extraordinary intervention in the life of people. Miracles, and even retribution, generally fall into the latter category.

== Etymology ==
The word providence comes from Latin providentia meaning foresight or prudence, and that in turn from pro- 'ahead' and videre 'to see', while divine evolved in the late 14th century to mean "pertaining to, in the nature of or proceeding from God or a god". This word came from the Old French devin, with a similar meaning, and that from the Latin divinus, meaning 'of a god', in turn from divus, with similar meaning, which was related the Latin deus, meaning god or deity. The current use of the word "providence" in a secular sense refers to foresight, or to "timely preparation for eventualities", or (if one is a deist or an atheist) "nature as providing protective care".

== Theology ==
=== Jewish ===
Divine providence (Hebrew: השגחה פרטית, romanized: Hashgochoh Protis / Hashgachah Pratit, lit. '[Divine] supervision of the individual') is discussed throughout Rabbinic literature, and in particular by the classical Jewish philosophers. These writings maintain that divine providence means that God is directing (or even recreating) every minute detail of creation. This analysis thus underpins much of Orthodox Judaism's world view, particularly regarding questions of interaction with the natural world.

=== Christian ===
Augustine of Hippo is often associated with the doctrine of divine providence in the Latin West. Augustine held that the universe is under the continuous control and unifying governance of a single Supreme Being, since God's governance takes place over a vast multitude of relatively independent individuals differing in nature, function, and end.

The biblical commentator H. E. Ryle reflects on the narrative about Joseph in Genesis 37 onwards, observing that "throughout all the events of his chequered life, God's overruling Providence is seen to be guiding him".

==== Catholic ====
Christian teaching on Providence in the High Middle Ages was most fully developed by Thomas Aquinas in the Summa Theologica. The concept of providence as care exercised by God over the universe, his foresight and care for its future is extensively developed and explained both by Aquinas himself and modern Thomists. One of the foremost modern Thomists, Dominican father Reginald Garrigou-Lagrange, wrote a study of providence entitled Providence: God's loving care for men and the need for confidence in Almighty God. In it, he presents and solves, according to Catholic doctrine, the most difficult issues as related to Providence.

Jean Pierre de Caussade (7 March 1675 – 8 December 1751), a French Jesuit priest and writer, is known for the work ascribed to him known as Abandonment to Divine Providence.

==== Eastern Orthodox ====
The doctrine of providence in Eastern Orthodoxy is set out by St. John of Tobolsk:

St. John Damascene describes it thus: "Providence is Divine will which maintains everything and wisely rules over everything" .... It was not by chance that the iniquitous Israeli King Ahab was struck by an arrow that flew in between the seams of his armor. Truly that arrow was directed by the hand of God, just as was the one which struck Julian the Apostate; only for the soldier who let fly the arrow was it accidental. It was not by chance that swallows flew into the home of Tobit and blinded the righteous man. This happened at God’s command, in order to hold Tobit up as an example to succeeding generations, as we learn from the Angel who accompanied his son Tobias. Nothing happens by chance. It was not by chance that Caesar Augustus ordered the census to be taken in the year of Christ’s Nativity. It was not by chance that Christ met with the Samaritan woman at the well in Sychar and spoke with her. All this was foreseen and written down in the books of Divine Providence before the beginning of time.

==== Lutheran ====
In Lutheran theology, divine providence refers to God's preservation of creation, his cooperation with everything that happens, and his guiding of the universe. While God cooperates with both good and evil deeds, with the evil deeds he does so only in as much as they are deeds, not with the evil in them. God concurs with an act's effect, but he does not cooperate in the corruption of an act or the evil of its effect. Lutherans believe everything exists for the sake of the Christian Church, and that God guides everything for its welfare and growth.

According to Martin Luther, divine providence began when God created the world with everything needed for human life, including both physical things and natural laws. In Luther's Small Catechism, the explanation of the first article of the Apostles' Creed declares that everything people have that is good is given and preserved by God, either directly or through other people or things. Of the services others provide us through family, government, and work, he writes, "we receive these blessings not from them, but, through them, from God." Since God uses everyone's useful tasks for good, people should look not down upon some useful vocations as being less worthy than others. Instead people should honor others, no matter how lowly, as being the means God uses to work in the world.

==== Reformed ====
The concept of divine providence is an integral part of reformed theology, which emphasizes the total depravity of man and the complete sovereignty of God. Article 13 of the Belgic Confession, a Reformed confession of faith, first outlines the doctrine, then explains why it does not entail that God is the author of evil, finally exhorting its readers to humility for this doctrine, which is said to afford great consolation to Christians.

We believe that the same God, after he had created all things, did not forsake them, or give them up to fortune or chance, but that He rules and governs them according to his holy will, so that nothing happens in this world without his appointment: nevertheless, God neither is the author of, nor can be charged with the sins which are committed. For his power and goodness are so great and incomprehensible, that he orders and executes his work in the most excellent and just manner, even then, when devils and wicked men act unjustly.

The Confession draws from many biblical proof-texts, including Acts 4:27–28 ("For of a truth against thy holy child Jesus, whom thou hast anointed, both Herod, and Pontius Pilate, with the Gentiles, and the people of Israel, were gathered together, For to do whatsoever thy hand and thy counsel determined before to be done"). This text in particular is taken as illustrative of the concept of concursus dei ('divine concurrence'), which Reformed theologian Louis Berkhof defines as "the cooperation of the divine power with all subordinate powers, according to the pre-established laws of their operation, causing them to act and to act precisely as they do". In the case of Acts 4, this means that the sinful doings of Herod, Pilate and others were permitted by God according to what his "counsel" had "determined before to be done". Divine providence and human free will are thus not regarded as contradictory; rather the former is said to be the very ordering principle of the latter (and furthermore, evil cannot be attributed to God, as his permitting of evil to occur was only in view of a greater end, which is the redemption of the elect in Acts 4). This has two implications: Firstly, that: "the powers of nature do not work by themselves, that is, simply by their own inherent power, but that God is immediately operative in every act of the creature." Secondly, that secondary causes "are real, and not to be regarded simply as the operative power of God. It is only on condition that second causes are real, that we can properly speak of a concurrence or co-operation of the First Cause with secondary causes." The first implication, that God is "immediately operative in every act of the creature", and steers the course of creation according to his will, distinguishes the Reformed faith from deism which states that God created the world but leaves it as if it were a mere mechanism, without intervening. The second implication, that secondary or contingent causes exist, refutes the opposite extreme of deism, which is occasionalism or pantheism; the idea that God is the only agent or cause that exists.

And, as to what he doth surpassing human understanding, we will not curiously inquire into, farther than our capacity will admit of; but with the greatest humility and reverence adore the righteous judgments of God, which are hid from us, contenting ourselves that we are disciples of Christ, to learn only those things which he has revealed to us in his word, without transgressing these limits. This doctrine affords us unspeakable consolation, since we are taught thereby, that nothing can befall us by chance, but by the direction of our most gracious and heavenly Father; who watches over us with a paternal care, keeping all creatures so under His power that not a hair of our head (for they are all numbered) nor a sparrow can fall to the ground, without the will of our Father, in whom we do entirely trust, being persuaded that he so restrains the devil and all our enemies, that without his will and permission, they cannot hurt us. And therefore we reject that damnable error of the Epicureans, who say that God regards nothing, but leaves all things to chance.

The Confession then takes a turn towards humility regarding this doctrine, "And as to what He doth surpassing human understanding, we will not curiously inquire into it further than our capacity will admit of;" while also proclaiming the "unspeakable consolation" that it affords for believers, who may be assured that nothing befalls them by chance but by the will of their Father. This is proved by the words of Christ in Matthew 10:29–31: "Are not two sparrows sold for a farthing? And one of them shall not fall on the ground without your Father. But the very hairs of your head are all numbered. Fear ye not therefore, ye are of more value than many sparrows." Finally, the article rejects Epicureanism, an ancient philosophy which taught that the world is ultimately chaotic, and that there is no underlying order or predestination, rather that everything is subject to luck or random chance. The doctrine of providence, and its implications regarding the immanence of God in all secondary causes, and the fact that nothing can come to pass without his divine foreordination, stands in direct contradiction to Epicureanism, as it asserts that nothing is chaotic or random, but rather that everything is absolutely dependent upon the necessary will of God. Calvin gives the metaphor in the Institutes of the Christian Religion, that Creation is a great theatre, in which the epic drama of human history and redemption is played out, all according to the direction of the divine will.

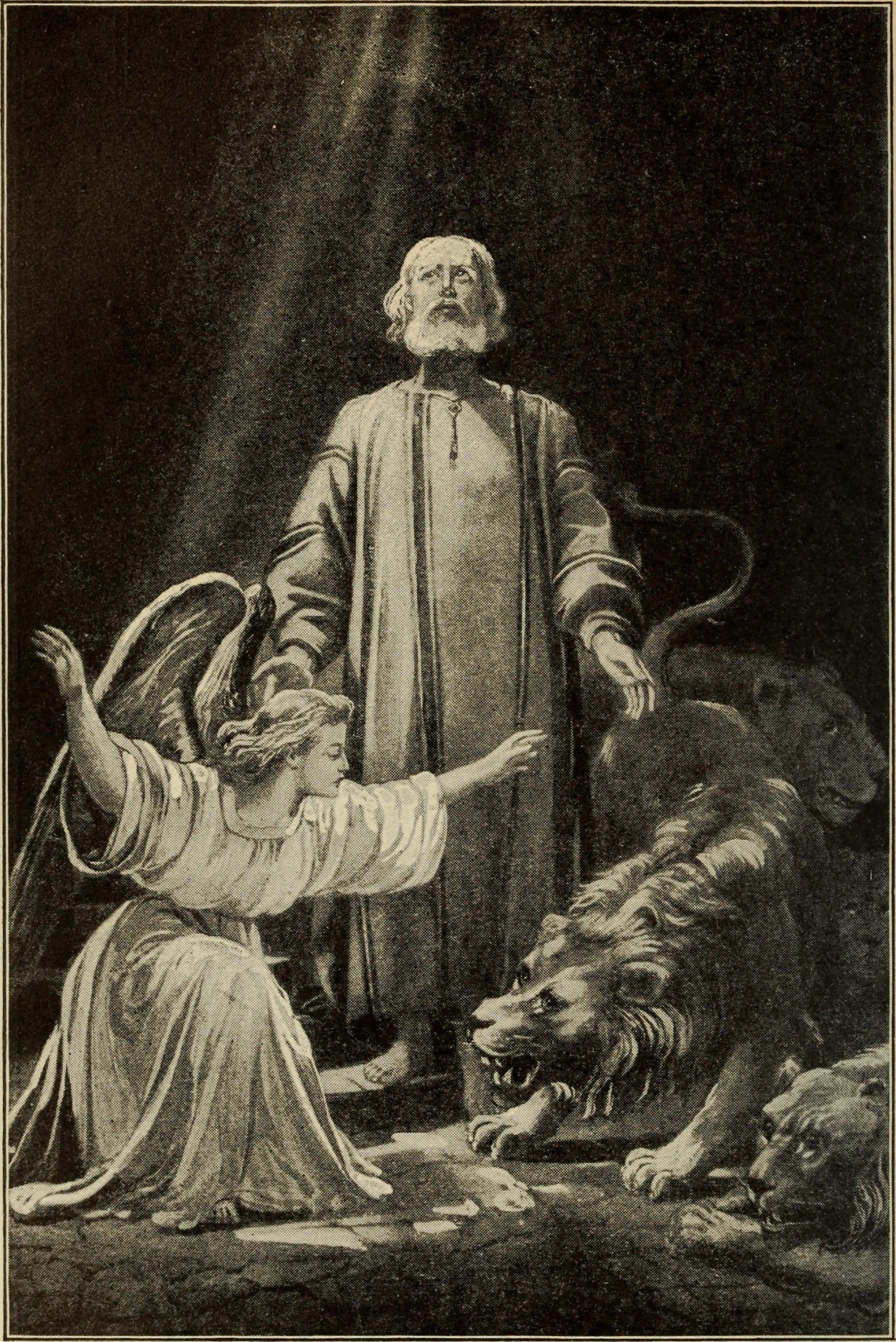
"My God hath sent his angel, and hath shut the lions' mouths, that they have not hurt me" (Daniel 6:22)

==== Arminian ====
At the beginning of the 17th century, the Dutch theologian Jacobus Arminius formulated Arminianism and disagreed with Calvin in particular on election and predestination. Arminianism is defined by God's limited mode of providence. This mode of providence affirms the compatibility between human free will and divine foreknowledge, but its incompatibility with theological determinism. Thus predestination in Arminianism is based on divine foreknowledge, unlike in Calvinism. It is therefore a predestination by foreknowledge. From this perspective, comes the notion of a conditional election on the one who wills to have faith in God for salvation.

==== Swedenborgian ====
Divine Providence is a book published by Emanuel Swedenborg in 1764 which describes his systematic theology regarding providence, free will, theodicy, and other related topics. Both meanings of providence are applicable in Swedenborg's theology, in that providence encompasses understanding, intent and action. Divine providence relative to man is 'foresight', and relative to the Lord is 'providence'. Swedenborg proposes that one law of divine providence is that man should act from freedom according to reason, and that man is regenerated according to the faculties of rationality and liberty.

==== Latter Day Saint (LDS) ====
There is little theological literature on the term providence in LDS studies. As stated above, Reformed theology relates these terms to predestination, which does have more prominence in LDS theology, if only as a polemical term.

One particular text that could be interpreted as being related to such terms is in the Book of Abraham. As Abraham is shown the heavens, he is also shown the pre-mortal spirits of mankind:

And God saw these souls that they were good, and he stood in the midst of them, and he said: These I will make my rulers; for he stood among those that were spirits, and he saw that they were good; and he said unto me: Abraham, thou art one of them; thou wast chosen before thou wast born.

The "making of rulers" above is explained as foreordination (in the chapter summary) as opposed to "predestination".

This differentiation balances free will (or free agency in LDS theology) against divine intervention. LDS scholar Richard Draper has described the church's position thus:

The Church of Jesus Christ of Latter-day Saints rejects the belief in predestination – that God predetermines the salvation or the damnation of every individual .... The LDS position is based in part on the teachings of Paul that God "will render to every man according to his deeds" and that "there is no respect of persons with God" (Rom. 2:6, 11). These two principles provide a basis for understanding Paul's use of the term "predestination". The term apparently connoted "to be ordained beforehand for godly labor". In the sense that one's potential or calling has been recognized and declared, this interpretation conforms with the Greek term Paul used, proorizo, and does not denote an irreversible or irresistible predetermination.

However, this does not imply a passive God. LDS theology favours a more active, interventionist God. In a General Conference, Elder Ronald A. Rasband of the Quorum of the Twelve Apostles articulates this: "Our lives are like a chessboard, and the Lord moves us from one place to another". Rasband continues by citing a well-known text from in the Book of Mormon in which Nephi finds his nemesis unconscious from inebriation in front of him, he concludes, "Was he fortunate to just happen upon Laban? Or was it by 'divine design'?" Although the text itself limits the interaction of the divine to the "Spirit" to commanding Nephi to "Slay him."

God also limits his involvement. Rasband interprets one particular passage from the Book of Mormon as saying that God (through his Spirit) will only intervene based on righteousness. Rasband concludes that, "When we are righteous, willing, and able, when we are striving to be worthy and qualified, we progress to places we never imagined and become part of Heavenly Father's 'divine design'."

=== Islam ===
When Moses (Musa) and Aaron (Harun) arrive in the court of Pharaoh, the Pharaoh begins questioning Musa about the God he follows. The Quran records Musa answering the Pharaoh:

۝ He answered, our Lord is he who giveth all things: He hath created them, and directed them by his providence

== Text of Scripture ==
Those who believe in the inerrancy of the original biblical manuscripts often accompany this belief with a statement about how the biblical text has been preserved so that what we have today is at least substantially similar to what was written. That is, just as God "divinely inspired the text", so he has also "divinely preserved it throughout the centuries". The Westminster Confession of Faith states that the Scriptures, "being immediately inspired by God, and by his singular care and providence kept pure in all ages, are therefore authentical."

This is an important argument in the "King James only" debates. Edward F. Hills argues that the principle of providentially preserved transmission guarantees that the printed Textus Receptus must be the closest text to the Greek autographs.

== Politics ==
In the United States Declaration of Independence, it is cited, "And for the support of this Declaration, with a firm reliance on the protection of divine Providence, we mutually pledge to each other our Lives, our Fortunes and our sacred Honor".

== See also ==
- Act of God
- Deism
- Destiny or Fate
- Determinism
- Eye of Providence
- Mortification in Catholic theology
- Providence Plantations, the original name of the Rhode Island mainland
- Providence, Rhode Island, named for "God's merciful Providence", which its founder believed had helped him discover the place to settle.
- Russian avos'
- Synchronicity
- Tian
