= Luis de Molina =

Spanish Catholic priest and philosopher (1535–1600)

The Reverend Luis de Molina SJ
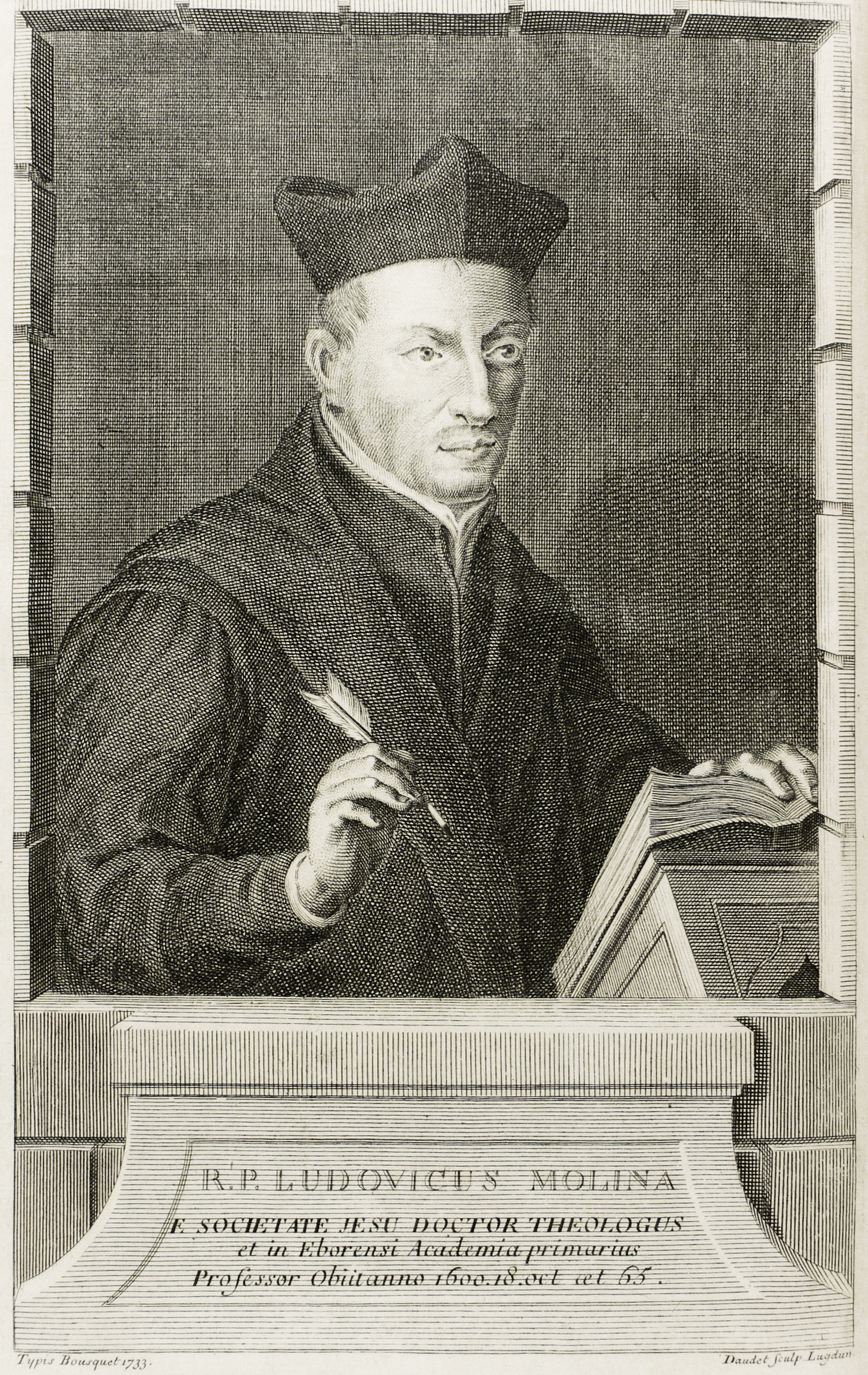
- Portrait of Luis de Molina
- Born: 29 September 1535; Cuenca, Crown of Castile
- Died: 12 October 1600 (aged 65); Madrid, Kingdom of Castile, Crown of Castile

Education
- Education: University of Salamanca

Philosophical work
- Era: 16th-century philosophy
- Region: Western philosophy; Spanish philosophy
- School: Second scholasticism School of Salamanca
- Institutions: University of Coimbra; University of Évora
- Main interests: Contract law Economics; Mercantilism
- Notable ideas: Molinism

Luis de Molina (29 September 1535 – 12 October 1600) was a Spanish Jesuit Catholic priest, jurist, economist and theologian renowned for his contributions to philosophy and economics within the framework of the second scholasticism.

A prominent member of the School of Salamanca, pioneered a distinctive theory of divine grace and human freedom known as Molinism, which defends human autonomy in the face of divine omniscience.

His pro-liberty perspectives influenced not only theological debates on free will but also extended to economic and political thought, making him an intellectual precursor to individual rights and market dynamics. His work in developing early economic principles, particularly regarding human action, voluntarism, and property rights, laid a foundation that later contributed to Austrian economic theory and the evolution of modern libertarian thought.

== Life ==
Luis de Molina was born on 29 September 1535 in Castile to a wealthy noble family. He followed the aspirations of his parents who wanted him to become a jurist. After learning Latin and literature at the Cathedral School of Cuenca, he enrolled at the University of Salamanca.

During his studies, Molina discovered the Spiritual Exercises of Ignatius of Loyola, which led him to join the Society of Jesus and abandon his law studies. In 1553, he became a novice in Alcalá de Henares, where he showed a taste and talent for Christian philosophy. In 1554, he was sent by his superiors to study philosophy at the University of Coimbra.

Following the advice of Pedro da Fonseca, he continued his studies after obtaining his master's degree in 1558 in order to become a priest and obtain a doctorate in theology. Between 1563 and 1567, he was a professor of philosophy and theology in Coimbra. At the request of their superiors, Molina and Fonseca then left to teach at the University of Évora.

After expounding his theological views in his work Liberi Arbitrii cum Gratiae Donis, Divina Praescientia, Providentia, Praedestinatione et Reprobatione Concordia, better known simply as Concordia and which was a commentary on the first part of the Summa Theologiae of Thomas Aquinas, he was violently attacked by Tomas de Lemos and Domingo Báñez. The latter went so far as to denounce Molina to the Spanish Inquisition. As a result, he returned to his village of Cuenca to serve as a parish priest and write his major work, De iure et iustitia.

In 1597, Pope Clement VIII asked Cardinal Michele Bonelli to gather theologians to verify the conformity of Molinism with the Catholic faith. Taking the name of Congregatio de Auxiliis, this assembly would sit until 1607, when Paul V declared this doctrine acceptable.

Sent to Madrid in 1600 by his superiors to teach moral theology at the University of Alcalá. He died in that city on October 12, 1600.

== Doctrine ==
=== Molinism ===
Molinism was an attempt to reconcile the Augustinian doctrines of predestination and efficacious grace with the new ideals of the Renaissance concerning free will. Assuming that man is free to perform or not to perform any act whatever, Molina maintains that this circumstance renders the grace of God neither unnecessary nor impossible: not impossible, for God never fails to bestow grace upon those who ask it with sincerity; and not unnecessary, for grace, although not an efficient, is still a sufficient cause of salvation (gratia mere sufficiens, "merely sufficient grace"). Nor, in Molina's view, does his doctrine of free will exclude predestination. The omniscient God, by means of His scientia media ("middle knowledge", a phrase of Molina's invention, though the idea is also to be found in his older contemporary Fonseca), i.e. his power of knowing future contingent events, foresees how we shall employ our own free will and treat his proffered grace, and upon this foreknowledge he can found his predestinating decrees.

These doctrines, which opposed both traditional understanding of Augustinism and Thomism concerning the respective roles of free will and efficacious grace, and the teachings of Martin Luther and John Calvin, excited violent controversy in some quarters, especially on the part of the Dominican Order and of the Jansenists, and at last rendered it necessary for Pope Clement VIII to intervene. At first (1594) he simply enjoined silence on both parties so far as Spain was concerned; but ultimately, in 1598, he appointed the Congregatio de auxiliis Gratiae to settle the dispute, which increasingly became a party one. After very numerous sessions the congregation was unable to decide anything, and in 1607 its meetings were suspended by Paul V, who in 1611 prohibited all further discussion of the question de auxiliis and of discussions about efficacious grace, and studious efforts were made to control the publication even of commentaries on Aquinas.

Several regent Masters of the Dominican College of St. Thomas, the future Pontifical University of Saint Thomas Aquinas (Angelicum), were involved in the Molinist controversy. The Dominicans Diego Álvarez (c. 1550–1635), author of the De auxiliis divinae gratiae et humani arbitrii viribus, and Tomás de Lemos (1540–1629) were given the responsibility of representing the Dominican Order in debates before Pope Clement VIII and Pope Paul V.

=== Contract law ===
Although he is a convinced supporter of contractual consensualism, Molina remains aware of the differences that still exist between civil law and canon law, but calls for their disappearance. With his opinions, he also prepares the emergence of a theory of the autonomy of the will, later formulated by Pedro de Oñate.

Like most members of the School of Salamanca, he discusses the respect of the principles of equity and commutative justice in contractual exchanges, which he considers fundamental.

But what is introduced for the common good must not be to the detriment of one person rather than another, by excoriating what natural law prescribes, so that you do not do to another what you do not reasonably wish to be done to you. but it would be to the detriment of one rather than the other, if you did not preserve equality

— Luis de Molina, De iustitia et iure, tract.2, disp.350, col.405, n°6

Discussing the "diamond-water paradox", Molina cogitated a theory of just price where the utility was not taken into account. Thus, in his De jure et Justitia he said, "the just price of a pearl, which can be used only to decorate, is higher than the just price of grain, bread, or horses, even if the utility of these things is superior."

Furthermore, he discusses the effect of defects of consent on the validity of contractual commitments and allows, with Lessius, to distinctly separate the matters of contract law and testamentary law.

=== Economy ===
In his writings on economics, Molina helped further develop a theory of price inflation proposed by Juan de Medina and Martín de Azpilcueta in Salamanca, writing that "[i]n equal circumstances, the more abundant money is in one place, so much less is its value to buy things or to acquire things that are not money."

== Works ==
- De liberi arbitrii cum gratiae donis, divina praescientia, praedestinatione et reprobatione concordia, 4 vols., Lisbona, 1588; 2nd ed. Antwerp, 1595.
- De Hispanorum primogeniorum origine ac natura (in Latin). Lugduni: Pedro Landri. 1588.
- De jure et justitia, 6 vols., 1593–1609.
  - De iustitia et iure (in Latin). Vol. 1. Coloniae Allobrogum: Marc Michel & C Bousquet. 1733.
  - De iustitia et iure (in Latin). Vol. 2. Coloniae Allobrogum: Marc Michel & C Bousquet. 1733.
  - De iustitia et iure (in Latin). Vol. 3. Coloniae Allobrogum: Marc Michel & C Bousquet. 1733.
  - De iustitia et iure (in Latin). Vol. 4. Coloniae Allobrogum: Marc Michel & C Bousquet. 1733.
  - De iustitia et iure (in Latin). Vol. 5. Coloniae Allobrogum: Marc Michel & C Bousquet. 1733.
- Commentaria in primam partem divi Thomae (in Latin) (2 vols., fol. ed.). Cuenca. 1593.
  - Commentaria in primam divi Thomae partem (in Latin). Venetiis: Compagnia Minima. 1594.
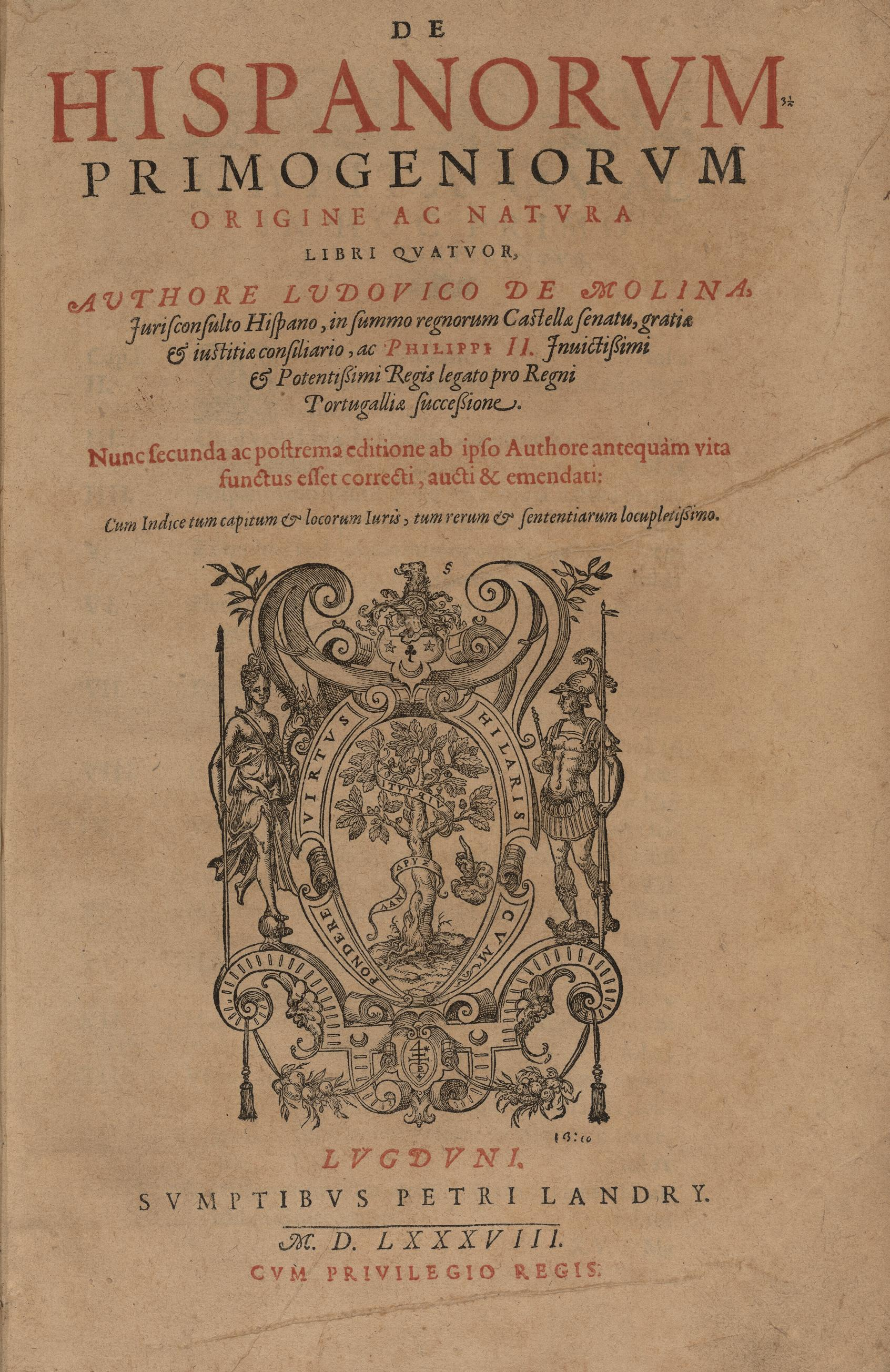
De Hispanorum primogeniorum origine ac natura, 1588

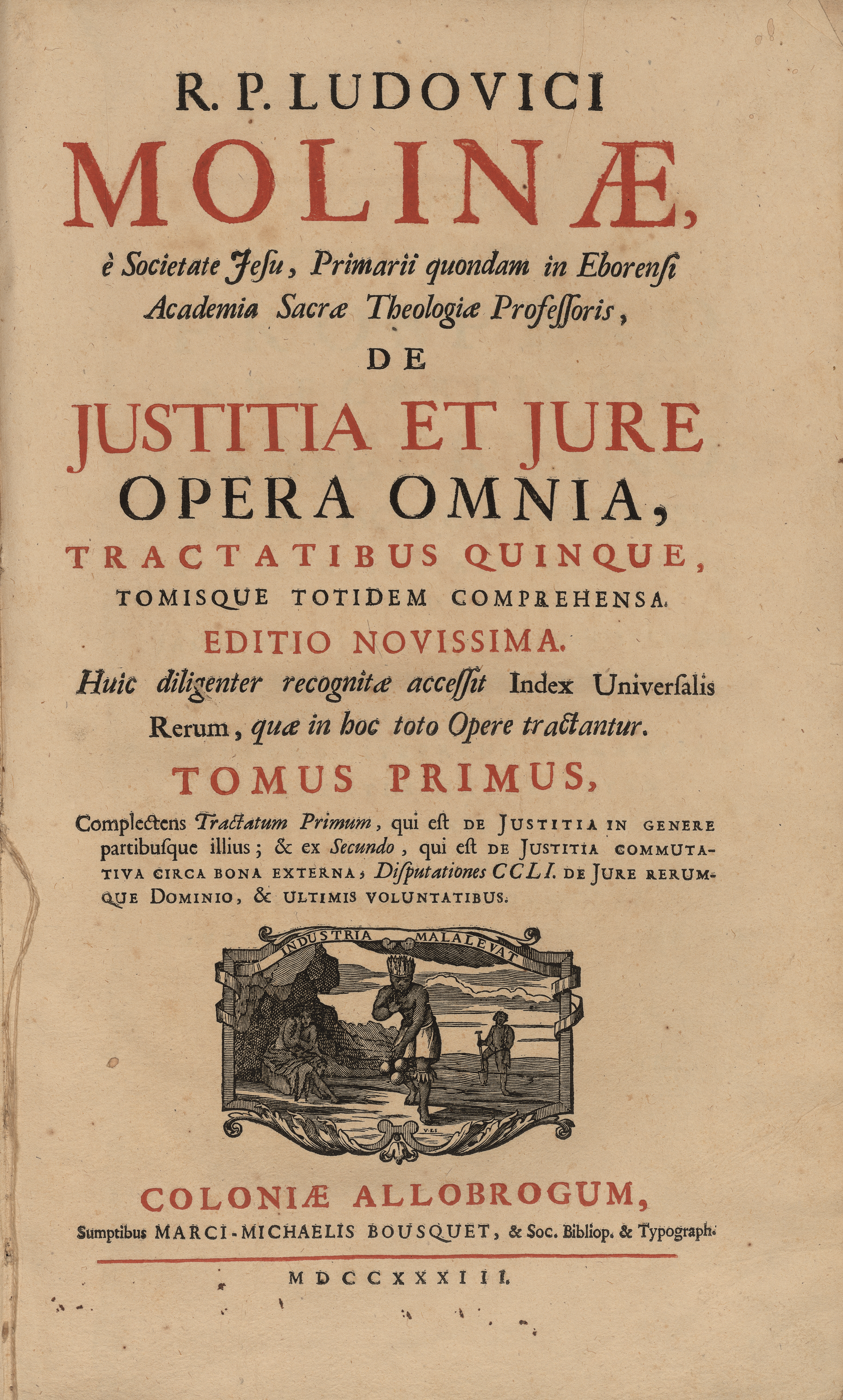
De iustitia et iure, 1733
