= Molinism =

Theological position on God's knowledge

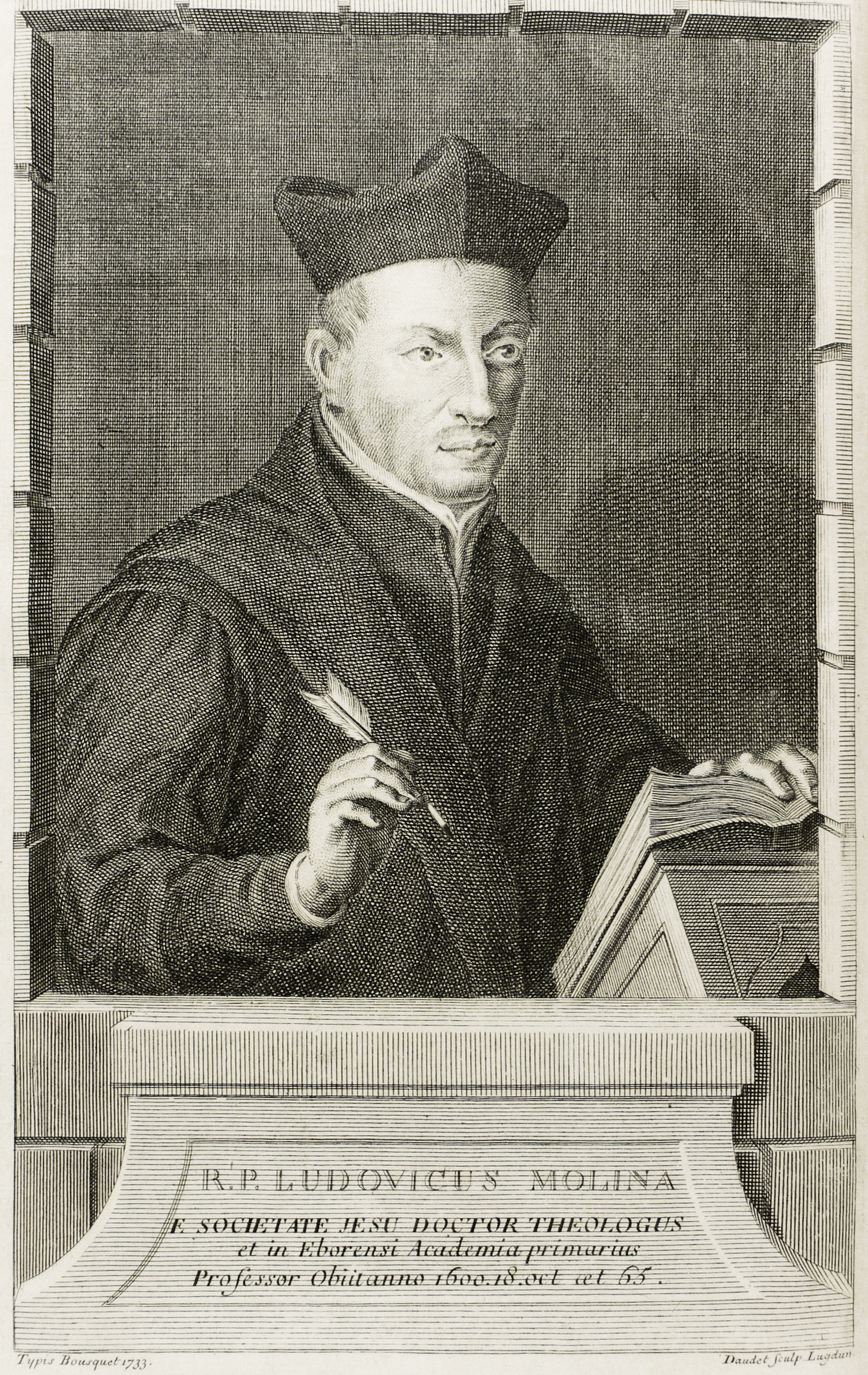
Luis de Molina, the namesake of Molinism

Molinism, named after 16th-century Spanish Jesuit theologian Luis de Molina, is the thesis that God has middle knowledge (or scientia media): the knowledge of counterfactuals, particularly counterfactuals regarding human action. It seeks to reconcile the apparent tension of divine providence and human free will. Prominent contemporary Molinists include William Lane Craig, Alfred Freddoso, Alvin Plantinga, Michael Bergmann, Thomas P. Flint, Kenneth Keathley, Dave Armstrong, John D. Laing, Timothy A. Stratton, Kirk R. MacGregor, and J.P. Moreland.

== God's types of knowledge ==
According to Kenneth Keathley, author of Salvation and Sovereignty: A Molinist Approach, Molinists argue that God perfectly accomplishes His will in the lives of genuinely free creatures through the use of His omniscience. Molinists, following Luis de Molina himself, present God's knowledge in a sequence of three logical moments.

The first is God's knowledge of necessary truths or natural knowledge. These truths are independent of God's will and are non-contingent. This knowledge includes the full range of logical possibilities. Examples include such statements as "All bachelors are unmarried" or "X cannot be A and non-A at the same time, in the same way, at the same place" or "It is possible that X obtain."

The second is God's free knowledge. This type of knowledge consists of contingent truths that are dependent upon God's will, or truths that God brings about. Examples include statements such as "God created the earth" or something particular about this world which God has actualized. Free knowledge encompasses the future of what will happen.

In between God's natural and free knowledge is His "middle knowledge" which contains the range of possible things that would happen given certain circumstances, by which God knows what His free creatures would do in any situation. These are truths that are contingent (not necessary), but are true without God being the primary cause of them. In The Internet Encyclopedia of Philosophy, John D. Laing has provided an example of middle knowledge: "If John Laing were given the opportunity to write an article on middle knowledge for the Internet Encyclopedia of Philosophy, he would freely do so."

Molinists have supported their case scripturally with Christ's statement in Matthew 11:23:

And you, Capernaum, will you be exalted to heaven? You will be brought down to Hades. For if the mighty works done in you had been done in Sodom, it would have remained until this day.

The Molinist claims that in this example, God knows what His free creatures would choose under hypothetical circumstances, namely that the Sodomites would have responded to Jesus' miracles and ministry in a way that Sodom would still have been in existence in Jesus' day, given that hypothetical situation.

Matthew 11:23 contains what is commonly called a counterfactual of creaturely freedom. But counterfactuals are to be distinguished from foreknowledge, and middle knowledge is to be distinguished from God's knowledge of counterfactuals (because, for example, Thomists affirm that God has counterfactual knowledge). The Bible contains many examples of foreknowledge such as Deut 31:16–17, where God tells Moses that the Israelites will forsake God after they are delivered from Egypt. The Bible also contains several examples of counterfactuals, such as 1Samuel 23:1–14 and Wisdom of Solomon 4:11.

Some opponents of Molinism claim that God's foreknowledge and knowledge of counterfactuals are examples of what God is going to actively bring about. That is, when Christ describes the response of the Sodomites in the aforementioned example, God was going to actively bring it about that they would remain until today. Molinists have responded to this objection by noting that scripture contains examples of God's foreknowledge of evil acts. For example, the Israelites forsaking God, or Peter's denial of Christ, are both examples of what one would call overt acts of sin. Yet, according to opponents of Molinism, God is actively bringing about these overt acts of sin. This is fallacious according to the Molinist. In order for this account of prophecy to be valid all prophecies must be wholly good, and never contain evil acts; but this is not what opponents believe to be the case. It may simply be the fact that Christ's human nature made a rational prediction of the said actions, as he once experienced beforehand from Peter, to which he replied, "Get thee behind me Satan".

== Knowledge of counterfactuals ==
Molinists believe that God has knowledge not only of necessary truths and contingent truths, but also of counterfactuals. (God's knowledge of counterfactuals is often referred to as his middle knowledge, although the term technically encompasses more than just the knowledge of counterfactuals.) A counterfactual is a statement of the form "If it were the case that P, it would be the case that Q." An example would be, "If Bob were in Tahiti he would freely choose to go swimming instead of sunbathing." The Molinist claims that even if Bob is never in Tahiti, God can still know whether Bob would go swimming or sunbathing. The Molinist believes that God, using his middle knowledge and foreknowledge, surveyed all possible worlds and then actualized a particular one. God's middle knowledge of counterfactuals would play an integral part in this "choosing" of a particular world.

Molinists say the logical ordering of events for creation would be as follows:

1. God's natural knowledge of necessary truths.
2. God's middle knowledge (including counterfactuals).
  —Creation of the World—
3. God's free knowledge (the actual ontology of the world).

Hence, God's middle knowledge plays an important role in the actualization of the world. In fact, it seems as if God's middle knowledge of counterfactuals plays a more immediate role in perception than God's foreknowledge. William Lane Craig points out that "without middle knowledge, God would find himself, so to speak, with knowledge of the future but without any logical prior planning of the future." The placing of God's middle knowledge between God's knowledge of necessary truths and God's creative decree is crucial. For if God's middle knowledge was after his decree of creation, then God would be actively causing what various creatures would do in various circumstances and thereby destroying libertarian freedom. But by placing middle knowledge (and thereby counterfactuals) before the creation decree God allows for freedom in the libertarian sense. The placing of middle knowledge logically after necessary truths, but before the creation decree also gives God the possibility to survey possible worlds and decide which world to actualize.

Craig gives three reasons for holding that counterfactual statements are true: "First, we ourselves often appear to know such true counterfactuals. Second, it is plausible that the Law of Conditional Excluded Middle (LCEM) holds for counterfactuals of a certain special form, usually called 'counterfactuals of creaturely freedom'. Third, the Scriptures are replete with counterfactual statements, so that the Christian theist, at least, should be committed to the truth of certain counterfactuals about free, creaturely actions."

== Theological implications ==
William Lane Craig calls Molinism "one of the most fruitful theological ideas ever conceived. For it would serve to explain not only God's knowledge of the future, but divine providence and predestination as well". Under it, God retains a measure of divine providence without hindering humanity's freedom. Since God has middle knowledge, He knows what an agent would freely do in a particular situation. So, agent A, if placed in circumstance C, would freely choose option X over option Y. Thus, if God wanted to accomplish X, all God would do is, using his middle knowledge, actualize the world in which A was placed in C, and A would freely choose X. God retains an element of providence without nullifying A's choice and God's purpose (the actualization of X) is fulfilled.

Molinists also believe it can aid one's understanding of salvation. Ever since Augustine and Pelagius there has been debate over the issue of salvation; more specifically, can God elect believers and believers still come to God freely? Protestants who lean more towards God's election to salvation and sovereignty are usually Calvinists while those who lean more towards humanity's free choice follow Arminianism. However, the Molinist can embrace both God's sovereignty and human free choice.

Take the salvation of Agent A. God knows that if He were to place A in circumstances C, then A would freely choose to believe in Christ. So God actualizes the world where C occurs, and then A freely believes. God still retains a measure of His divine providence because He actualizes the world in which A freely chooses. But, A still retains freedom in the sense of being able to choose either option. Molinism does not affirm two contradictory propositions when it affirms both God's providence and humanity's freedom. God's providence extends to the actualization of the world in which an agent may believe upon Christ.

=== Difference from Calvinism and from Arminianism ===
In contrast to the Calvinist acrostic TULIP and the Arminian Five Articles of Remonstrance, Timothy George has devised an acrostic summary for Molinism called ROSES:

- Radical Depravity
  - Man's nature is radically depraved from the fall.
- Overcoming Grace
  - God's grace overcomes man's radical depravity. As opposed to irresistible grace, man can respond.
- Sovereign Election
  - God's sovereign election of individuals, predetermined by His exercise of middle knowledge to know who would respond to Him in faith. This is instead of unconditional election, where God elects individuals independent of their libertarian free will.
- Eternal life
  - Regenerate believers will not fall away from a state of justification.
- Singular redemption
  - A modified view of limited atonement. Christ's redemption is sufficient for all, but applicable only to the elect.

Molinism differs from Calvinism by affirming that God grants salvation, but a person has the choice to freely accept it or reject it (but God knows that if the person were put in a particular situation he or she would not reject it). This differs from Calvinistic double predestination, which states that a person's salvation is already determined by God such that he or she cannot choose otherwise or resist God's grace.

Both Arminianism and Molinism agree that God definitively knows how a person would react to the Gospel message, but Molinism relies on the concept of middle knowledge while Arminianism does not.

Molinists have internal disagreements about the extent to which they agree with Calvinism, some holding to unconditional election, others holding to conditional election and others still holding to an election that is partly both. Alfred Freddoso explains: “Some Molinists, including Bellarmine and Suárez, agree with the Bañezians that God antecedently elects certain people to eternal glory and only then consults His middle knowledge to discover which graces will guarantee their salvation. Thus, in Peter's case, God would have chosen different graces if those He actually chose had been foreknown to be merely sufficient and not efficacious for Peter's salvation. Other Molinists, including Molina himself, vigorously reject any such antecedent absolute election of Peter to salvation. They insist instead that God simply chooses to create a world in which He infallibly foresees Peter's good use of the supernatural graces afforded him, and only then does he accept Peter among the elect in light of his free consent to those graces.” Other Molinists avoid the issue altogether by holding to the view of trans-world damnation, the idea that the unsaved in this world would have rejected Christ in any world.

=== Debate between Jesuit Molinists and Dominicans ===
In 1581, a heated argument erupted between the Jesuits, who advocated Molinism, and the Dominicans, who had a different understanding of God's foreknowledge and the nature of predestination. In 1597, Pope Clement VIII established the Congregatio de Auxiliis, a committee whose purpose was to settle this controversy. In 1607, Pope Paul V ended the quarrel by forbidding each side to accuse the other of heresy, allowing both views to exist side-by-side in the Catholic Church.

=== Other implications ===
Thomas Flint has developed what he considers other implications of Molinism, including papal infallibility, prophecy, and prayer. William Lane Craig uses Molinism to reconcile scriptural passages warning of apostasy with passages teaching the security of believers. Craig has also used middle knowledge to explain a wide range of theological issues, such as divine providence and predestination, biblical inspiration, perseverance of the saints, and Christian particularism.

== Biblical texts for Molinism ==
Molinists have often argued that their position is the biblical one by indicating passages they understand to teach God's middle knowledge. Molina advanced the following three texts: 1 Samuel 23:8–14, Proverbs 4:11, and Matthew 11:23. Other passages used to support Molinism are Ezekiel 3:6–7, Jeremiah 38:17–18, 1 Corinthians 2:8, Deuteronomy 28:51–57, Matthew 23:27–32, Matthew 12:7, Matthew 24:43, Luke 16:30–31, and Luke 22:67–68. William Lane Craig has argued at length that many of Christ's statements seem to indicate middle knowledge. Craig cites the following passages: Matthew 17:27, John 21:6, John 15:22–24, John 18:36, Luke 4:24–44 and Matthew 26:24. Craig accepts that the most these texts indicate is that God has counterfactual knowledge. In order for this knowledge to be middle knowledge, it must be logically prior to God's free knowledge, something the biblical texts mentioned do not seem to affirm or deny. However, Craig argues that if God's decree were logically prior to His middle knowledge, that would “make God the author of sin and to obliterate human freedom, since in that case it is God who decrees which counterfactuals about creaturely free acts are true, including counterfactuals concerning sinful human decisions. Thus, we have good reason for thinking that if such counterfactuals are now true or false, they must have been so logically prior to God's decree.”

Thomas Flint claims the twin foundations of Molinism are God's providence and man's freedom. Molinism harmonizes texts teaching God's providence (such as Acts 4:28 or Ephesians 1:11) with texts emphasizing man's choice (such as Deuteronomy 30:19 or Luke 13:34).

== Criticism ==
Molinism has been controversial and criticized since its inception in Molina's concordia. The Dominican Order which espoused strict Thomism criticized that novel doctrine and found fault with the scientia media, which they think implies passivity, which is repugnant to Pure Act. The Thomists disputed it before the Popes, as bordering on semi-Pelagianism, and afterwards there were ten years of debate in the Congregation de Auxiliis.

The grounding objection is at present the most debated objection to Molinism, and often considered the strongest. The argument claims that there are no metaphysical grounds for the truthfulness of counterfactuals of creaturely freedom. As Hugh J. McCann puts it:

"Perhaps the most serious objection against it is that there does not appear to be any way God could come by such knowledge. Knowledge, as we have seen, is not merely a matter of conceiving a proposition and correctly believing it to be true. It requires justification: one must have good reasons for believing. But what justification could God have for believing the propositions that are supposed to constitute middle knowledge? The truth of subjunctives of freedom cannot be discerned a priori, for they are contingent. It is not a necessary truth that if placed in circumstances C, I will decide to attend the concert tonight. Nor can we allow that God might learn the truth of C from my actual behavior — that is, by observing that I actually do, in circumstances C, decide to attend the concert. For God could not make observations like this without also finding out what creative decisions He is actually going to make, which would destroy the whole purpose of middle knowledge.”

Thus, there are no "truth makers" that ground counterfactuals. Opponents to middle knowledge claim that the historical antecedent of any possible world does not determine the truthfulness of a counterfactual for a creature, if that creature is free in the libertarian sense. (Molinists naturally accept this, but deny that this entails that counterfactuals of creaturely freedom lack truth values.)

Many philosophers and theologians who embrace the grounding objection prefer to claim that instead of counterfactuals of freedom being true, probable counterfactuals are true instead. So instead of truths of the following sort: "God knows that in circumstance C creature X will freely do A" God knows truths of this sort: "God knows that in circumstances C creature X would probably do A." Yet, as Edward Wierenga has pointed out, probable counterfactuals are also contingent truths and fall victim to the same grounding objection.

Molinists have responded to the aforementioned argument two ways. First, as William Lane Craig argues "[I]n order for a counterfactual of freedom to be true, it is not required that the events to which they refer actually exist; all that is required is that they would exist under the specified conditions." The idea here is that if we imagine God creating multiple universes in multiple dimensions and giving people libertarian free will in the various universes and letting events all play out, we would have no problem grounding counterfactuals of freedom based on the events in the various universes. But why should God need to create such universes to know how events would unfold, and couldn't how they would turn out ground statements about how they would turn out?

Further objections at this point lead to a second line of response. Alvin Plantinga responds to the grounding objection by saying "It seems to me much clearer that some counterfactuals of freedom are at least possibly true than that the truth of propositions must, in general, be grounded in this way." William Lane Craig follows up on this by pointing out the burden of proof the grounding objector bears. The grounding objection "asserts that there are no true counterfactuals about how creatures would freely act under any given set of circumstances. This assertion is no mere ostensibly undercutting defeater of Molinism, but a putatively rebutting defeater. It makes a bold and positive assertion and therefore requires warrant in excess of that which attends the Molinist assumption that there are true counterfactuals about creaturely free actions" and that "Anti–Molinists have not even begun the task of showing that counterfactuals of creaturely freedom are members of the set of propositions or statements which require truth–makers if they are to be true." Thus the grounding objectors must prove a universal negative regarding the falsity of counterfactuals of freedom or they must explain their theory of the basis for truth and prove that theory true.

The difference in perspectives here may be briefly described in the following way. According to critics, the way in which an agent will make a free choice inherently cannot be known apart from observation of the choice being actualized. God may be able to observe these choices via prescience, but even He must still observe them to know them. Therefore, God cannot know what we will do, unless He sees the future. The Molinist position, exemplified by Craig in the preceding paragraph, is 1) to argue this requires potentially heretical arguments relating to a limitation of divine omniscience, and 2) that a choice can be free, and yet the way in which an agent will make that choice can be known apart from observation of the actualized choice itself (and even apart from the actualization of the choice entirely). Critics maintain that this is no longer really a free choice: if it is known of someone that "If she were offered a dollar, she would take it," apart from actually offering that person a dollar, then she is not free to take or not take that dollar. The question hinges upon whether, by the definition of a free choice, it is possible to know which choice will be made independently from the actualization of that choice.

== See also ==
- Compatibilism – Philosophical concept about free will
- Formulary controversy – 17/18th-century European religious controversy
- Law of excluded middle – Logical principle
- Amyraldism, also known as Moderate Calvinism – Christian doctrine
- Open theism – Christian theological movement
- Thomism – Philosophical system originating from Thomas Aquinas
- School of Salamanca – Spanish Scholastic intellectual movement
- Crypto-Protestantism – Protestants pretending to accept Catholicism

== References and further reading ==
- James Beilby and Paul Eddy. Divine Foreknowledge: 4 Views Illinois, InterVarsity; 2001.
- William Lane Craig, Divine Foreknowledge and Human Freedom. New York, E.J. Brill; 1991.
- Craig, William Lane (1999). The Only Wise God. Eugene, Wipf and Stock.
- Thomas Flint, Divine Providence, The Molinist Account. London, Cornell University Press; 1998.
- Hasker, William (2002). "The Antinomies of Divine Providence". Philosophia Christi. 4 (2): 361–375. doi:10.5840/pc20024239. S2CID 171716863.
- William Hasker, God, Time, and Knowledge. London, Cornell University Press; 1989.
- Keathley, Kenneth (2010). Salvation and Sovereignty: A Molinist Approach. Nashville: B&H Publishing Group. ISBN 978-0-8054-3198-8.
- MacGregor, Kirk. 2015. Luis de Molina: The Life and Theology of the Founder of Middle Knowledge. Grand Rapids: Zondervan
- Alvin Plantinga, God, Freedom, and Evil. Grand Rapids, Eerdmans; 1974.
- Plantinga, Alvin (1986). l. Peterson, Michael (ed.). "On Ockham's Way Out" (PDF). Faith and Philosophy. 3 (3): 235–69. doi:10.5840/faithphil19863322. Archived from the original (PDF) on June 13, 2010.
- Tiessen, Terrance. Providence & Prayer : How Does God Work in the World? Illinois, InterVarsity;
- Perszyk, Kenneth J. (2000). "Molinism and Compatibilism". International Journal for Philosophy of Religion. 48 (1): 11–33. doi:10.1023/A:1004084320464. S2CID 169668539.
- Craig, William Lane (1998). "On Hasker's Defense of Anti-Molinism". Faith and Philosophy. 15 (2): 236–240. doi:10.5840/faithphil199815220.
- Perszyk, Ken (August 2013). "Recent Work on Molinism". Philosophy Compass. 8 (8): 755–770. doi:10.1111/phc3.12057.
- Hasker, William (2000). "Anti-Molinism is Undefeated!". Faith and Philosophy. 17 (1): 126–131. doi:10.5840/faithphil20001715.
- Maitzen, Stephen (6 November 2008). "Does Molinism explain the demographics of theism?". Religious Studies. 44 (4): 473–477. doi:10.1017/S0034412508009670. S2CID 67791278.
- Boyd, Gregory A. (2003). "Neo-Molinism and the Infinite Intelligence of God". Philosophia Christi. 5 (1): 187–204. doi:10.5840/pc20035112.
- Kvanvig, Jonathan L. (2002). "On Behalf of Maverick Molinism". Faith and Philosophy. 19 (3): 348–357. doi:10.5840/faithphil200219332.
- Walls, Jerry L. (1990). "Is Molinism as Bad as Calvinism?". Faith and Philosophy. 7 (1): 85–98. doi:10.5840/faithphil1990712.
