= Second scholasticism =

16th- and 17th-century scholasticism revival

Part of the series on
Modern scholasticism
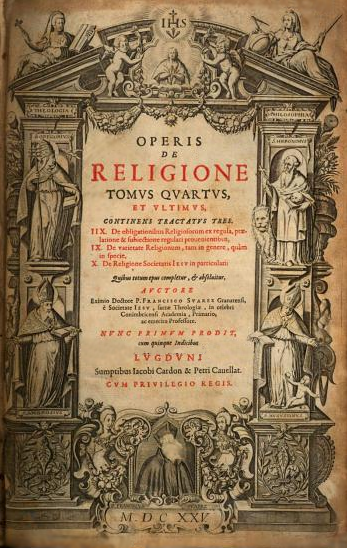
Title page of the Operis de religione (1625) from Francisco Suárez
Background

Protestant Reformation
Counter-Reformation
Aristotelianism
Scholasticism
Patristics

Modern scholastics

Second scholasticism of the School of Salamanca
Lutheran scholasticism during Lutheran orthodoxy
Ramism among the Reformed orthodoxy
Metaphysical poets in the Church of England

Reactions within Christianity

Jesuits against Jansenism
Labadists against the Jesuits
Pietism against orthodox Lutherans
Nadere Reformatie within Dutch Calvinism
Richard Hooker against the Ramists

Reactions within philosophy

Neologists against Lutherans
Spinozists against Dutch Calvinists
Deists against Anglicanism
John Locke against Bishop Stillingfleet

Second scholasticism, also called Modern scholasticism, is the period of revival of scholastic system of philosophy and theology, in the 16th and 17th centuries. The scientific culture of second scholasticism surpassed its medieval source (Scholasticism) in the number of its proponents, the breadth of its scope, the analytical complexity, sense of historical and literary criticism, and the volume of editorial production, most of which remains hitherto little explored.

== Scotism and Thomism ==
Unlike the "First", i.e. medieval scholasticism, a typical feature of second scholasticism was the development of schools of thought, developing the intellectual heritage of their "teacher". Two schools survived from earlier phases of scholasticism, Scotism and Thomism. The Scotists, mostly belonging to the various branches of the Franciscan order, include the Italians Antonio Trombetta, Bartolomeo Mastri, Bonaventura Belluto; the Frenchman Claude Frassen, the Irish emigrants Luke Wadding, John Punch, and Hugh Caughwell; and the Germans Bernhard Sannig and Crescentius Krisper. The Thomists were usually but not exclusively represented by the Iberians in the Dominican and the Carmelite orders. They include Thomas Cajetan (or Caietanus), Franciscus Ferrariensis, Domingo de Soto, Domingo Báñez, João Poinsot, the Complutenses and others.

== Second scholasticism in Catholic ambit ==
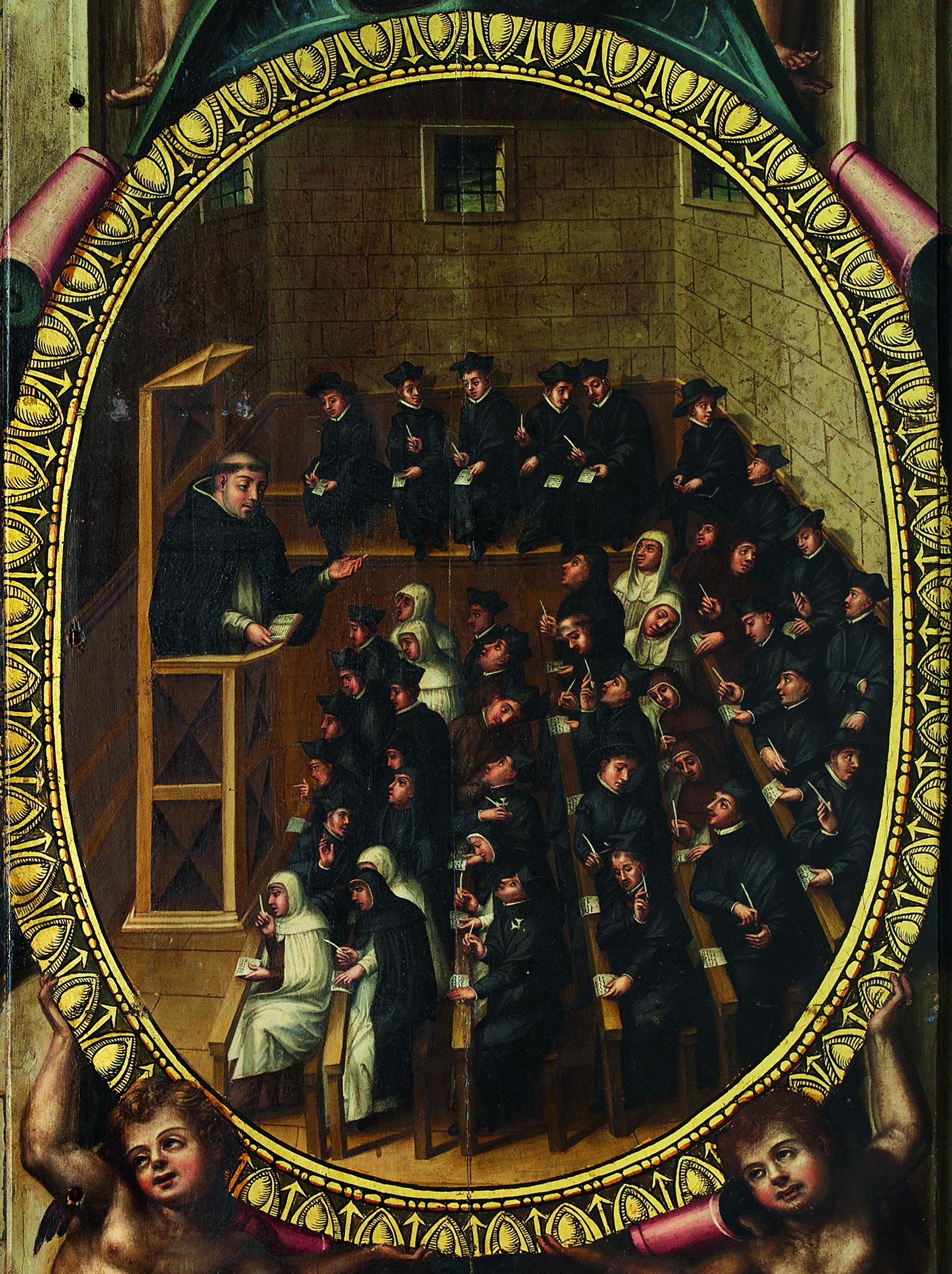
17th century classroom at the University of Salamanca

The emergence of the second scholasticism during Renaissance in the University of Salamanca was highly determined by the influence of Francisco de Vitoria and the Dominican order, which during the first half of the 16th century provided to the Second Scholasticism with some main figures, such as aforementioned Francisco de Vitoria, as well as Domingo de Soto, and an orientation focused on law, economy, theology and other academic disciplines that linked scholasticism with topics and problems more typical of modern societies.

The intellectual influence of second scholasticism was augmented by the establishment of the Society of Jesus (1540), by Ignatius Loyola, per approval of Pope Paul III. The "Jesuits" are considered a third "school" of second scholasticism, although this refers more to the common style of academic work rather than to some common doctrine. The important figures include Pedro da Fonseca, Antonio Rubio, the Conimbricenses, Robert Bellarmine, Francisco Suárez, Luis de Molina, Gabriel Vásquez, Pedro Hurtado de Mendoza, Rodrigo de Arriaga, Thomas Compton Carleton and many others. The joint intellectual and didactic work between Jesuits and Dominicans within the framework of the Counter-Reformation helped spread the ideas of the second scholasticism throughout the New World and Europe, where the orders, supported by monarchies and local authorities, founded academies, seminaries, universities also directing numerous prestigious universities of the period.

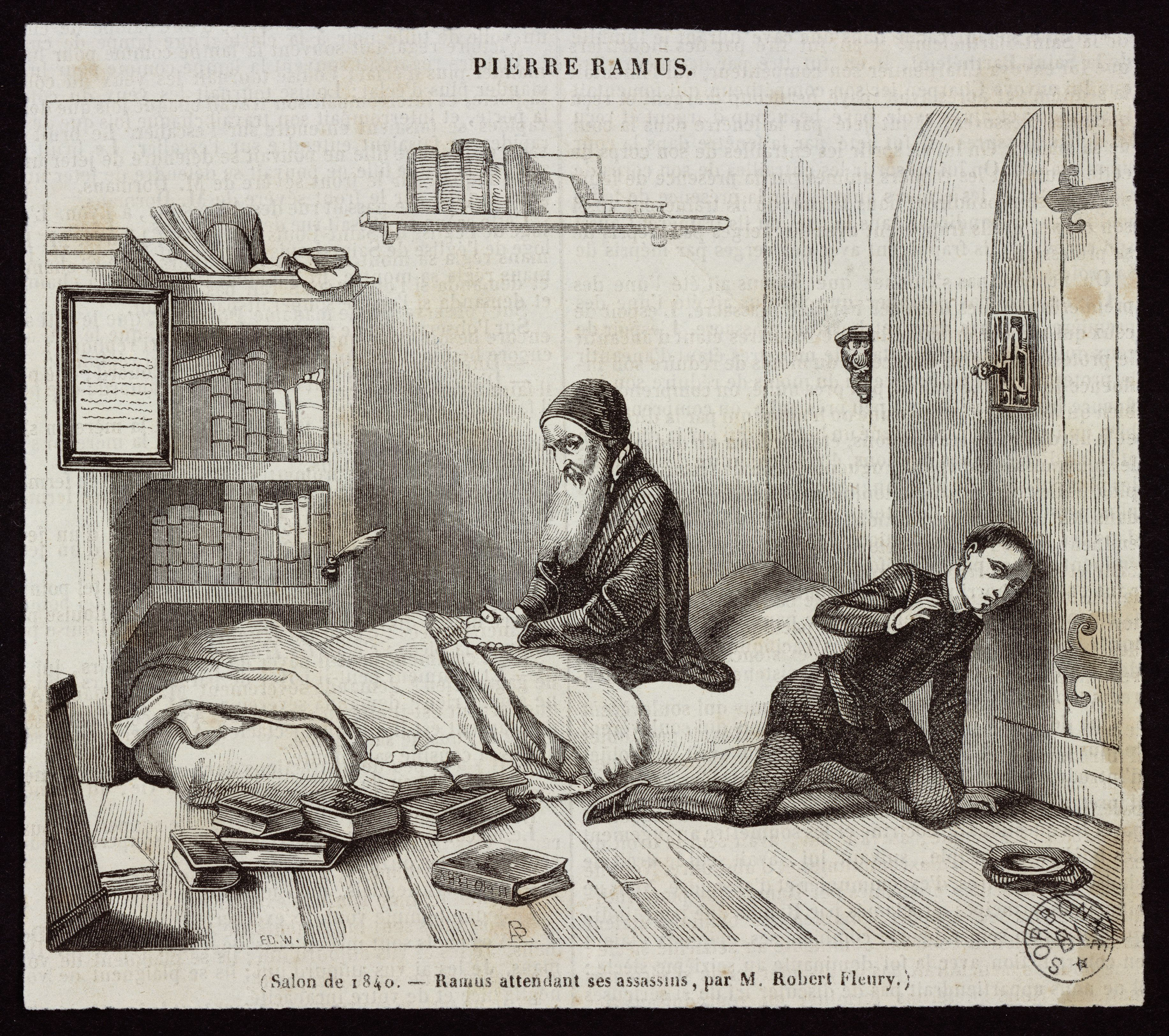
Ramus awaiting his murderers: wood engraving by Joseph-Nicolas Robert-Fleury, 1840

There were also several "independent" thinkers like Sebastián Izquierdo, Juan Caramuel y Lobkowicz, Kenelm Digby, Raffaello Aversa etc., that mixed the ideas of second scholasticism with the new ideas of enlightment.

== Decline and legacy ==
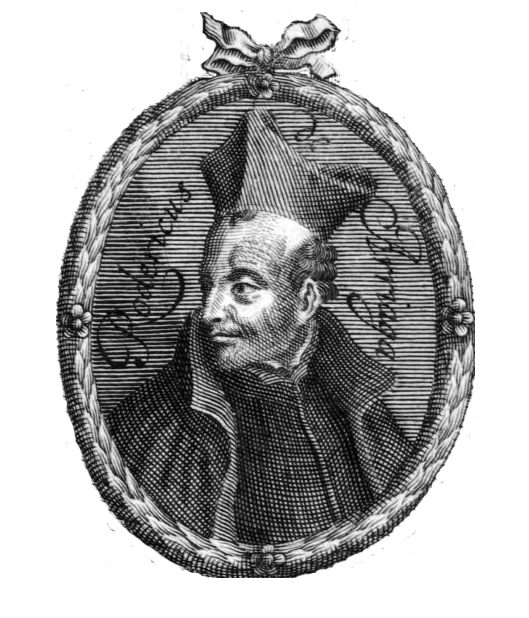
The jesuit and scholastic author Rodrigo de Arriaga

The golden age of second scholasticism was between the late 16th century and the first half of the 17th century; it remained largely in control of university curricula in philosophy. Second scholasticism began to decline under the influence of philosophers writing in vernacular languages. These philosophers were not entirely free from the impact of second scholasticism—which indeed played a significant role for many of them—but sought alternatives to the dominant Aristotelian thought nevertheless. Notable figures such as Descartes, Pascal, and Locke emerged as challengers. Second scholasticism also faced competition from more experimental and mathematical approaches to science promoted by the Scientific Revolution.

During the Enlightenment of the 18th century, second scholasticism remained largely dormant outside the Spanish empire and Portugal. Despite this, scholastics like Francisco Suárez, Juan de Mariana, and Luis de Molina retained influence for an extended period. Despite its decline, the second half of the 17th century and the early 18th century saw the emergence of influential authors who had a minor impact in the Catholic realm. Rodrigo de Arriaga, Juan de Sorozábal, Francisco Palanco, Miguel de Elizalde, and Diego Avendaño, among others, contributed to this period. Their impact did not match the extensive influence of scholastic authors from the 16th century and the first half of the 17th century.

Influenced by Emmanuel Maignan, philosophers like Jaime Servera and Tomás Vicente Tosca y Mascó attempted to provide a new innovative impulse to modern scholasticism. They aimed to synthesize the works and ideas of previous philosophers such as Suárez and Gabriel Vásquez with the new scientific discoveries.

In some Iberian universities, the modern scholastic culture persisted strongly into the 19th century, setting the stage for the emergence of Neo-scholasticism in the 19th century. Despite this, during the 18th century, modern scholasticism faced significant criticism from scholars associated with the Bourbon dynasty. The cultural shift in Spanish intellectual culture, transitioning from the conservative views of second scholasticism to the new ideas of French and British philosophers during the Enlightenment, further impacted modern scholasticism. Additionally, a notable decline occurred after the suppression of the Society of Jesus in 1767.

Interest in the thought of the modern scholastics has been recently revived by the journal Studia Neoaristotelica.

== See also ==
- Renaissance philosophy
- 17th century in philosophy
- Scholasticism
- School of Salamanca

== Bibliography ==
- Manlio Bellomo, The Common Legal Past of Europe, 1000-1800, Washington, D.C. The Catholic University of America Press, 1995.
- Josef Bordat and Johanna M. Baboukis, "Late Scholasticism". In: Oxford International Encyclopedia of Legal History. New York 2009.
- James Franklin, "Science by Conceptual Analysis: The Genius of the Late Scholastics", Studia Neoaristotelica 9 (2012), 3–24.
- James Gordley, The Philosophical Origins of Modern Contract Doctrine, Clarendon Press, Oxford 1991, ch. 3.
- Paolo Grossi, La Seconda scolastica nella formazione del diritto privato moderno, Giuffrè, Milan, 1973.
- Anneliese Maier (1949–58) Studien zur Naturphilosophe der Spätscholastik, 5 Bande
- Daniel D. Novotný, "In defense of Baroque scholasticism", Studia Neoaristotelica 6 (2009), 209–233.
- Daniel D. Novotný, Ens rationis from Suárez to Caramuel: A Study in Scholasticism of the Baroque Era, New York, Fordham University Press, 2013.
- Daniel Schwartz, The Political Morality of the Late Scholastics: Civic Life, War and Conscience, Cambridge: Cambridge University Press, 2019.
