= Spanish philosophy =

Philosophy of modern day Spain

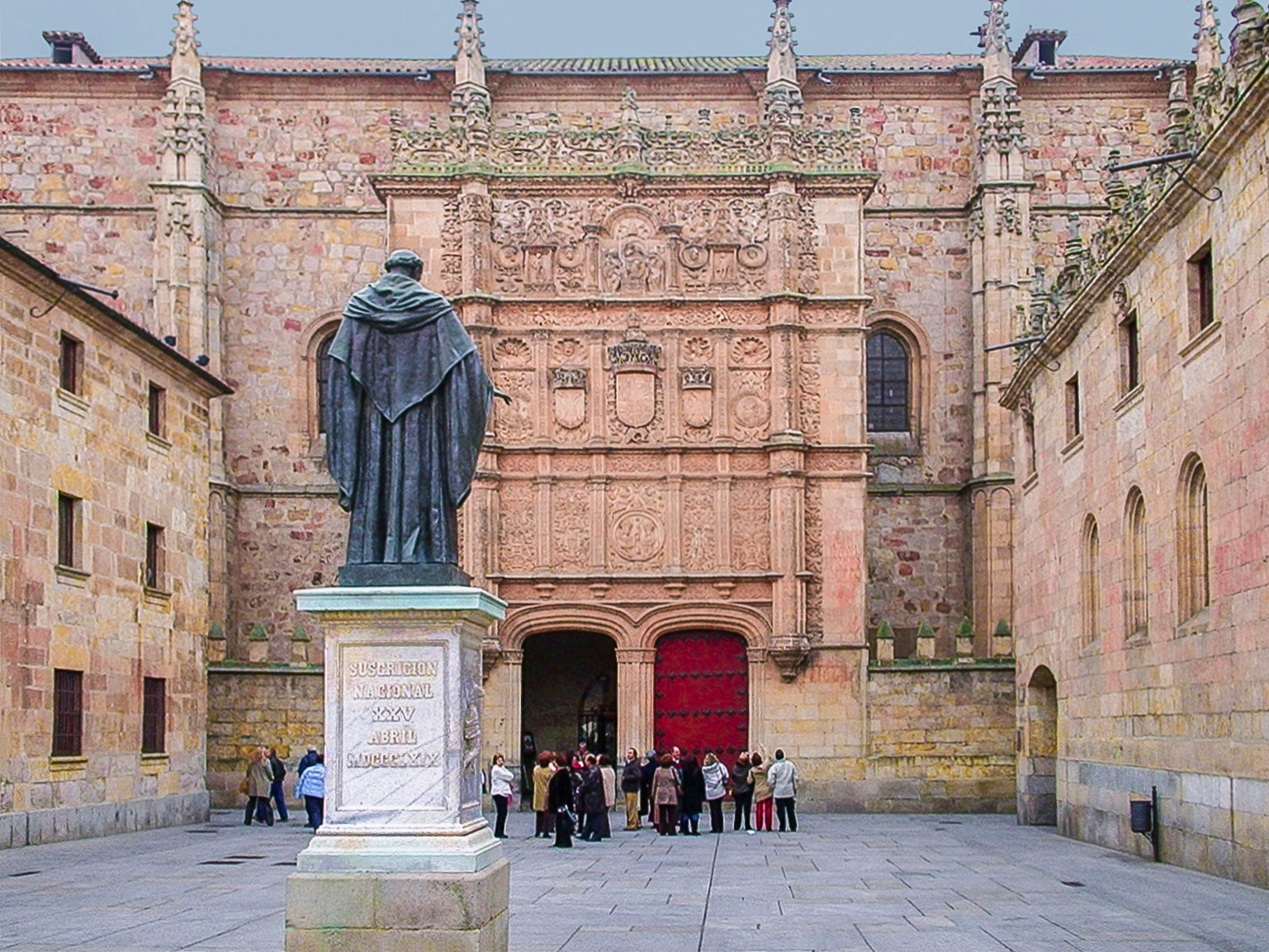
Façade of the University of Salamanca in which Francisco de Vitoria created the School of Salamanca and developed theories about international law.

Spanish philosophy is the philosophical tradition of the people of territories that make up the modern day nation of Spain and of its citizens abroad. Although Spanish philosophical thought had a profound influence on philosophical traditions throughout Latin America, political turmoil within Spain throughout the 20th century diminished the influence of Spanish philosophy in international contexts. Within Spain during this period, fictional novels written with philosophical underpinnings were influential, leading to some of the first modernist European novels, such as the works of Miguel de Unamuno and Pío Baroja.

Spanish philosophy reached its peak between the 16th and the 17th century. Francisco Suárez was the most influential Spanish philosopher of the period. His works influenced subsequent thinkers such as Leibniz, Grotius, Samuel Pufendorf, Schopenhauer, and Martin Heidegger. Like Suárez, other notable philosophers at the time who studied at the University of Salamanca were Luis de Molina, Francisco de Vitoria, Domingo de Soto, and Martín de Azpilcueta.

Another school of thought, the School of Madrid, founded by José Ortega y Gasset included thinkers like Manuel García Morente, Joaquim Xirau, Xavier Zubiri, José Luis Aranguren, Francisco Ayala, Pedro Laín Entralgo, Manuel Granell, Antonio Rodríguez Huéscar and their most prominent disciple, Julián Marías.

More recently, Fernando Savater, Gustavo Bueno, Antonio Escohotado and Eugenio Trías have emerged as prominent philosophers.

== Medieval philosophy ==
=== Isidore of Seville ===
(Latin: Isidorus Hispalensis; c. 560 – 4 April 636) was a Hispano-Roman scholar, theologian, and archbishop of Seville. He is widely regarded, in the words of 19th-century historian Montalembert, as "the last scholar of the ancient world".

At a time of disintegration of classical culture, aristocratic violence, and widespread illiteracy, Isidore was involved in the conversion of the Arian Visigothic kings to Chalcedonian Christianity, both assisting his brother Leander of Seville and continuing after his brother's death. He was influential in the inner circle of Sisebut, Visigothic king of Hispania. Like Leander, he played a prominent role in the Councils of Toledo and Seville.

His fame after his death was based on his Etymologiae, an etymological encyclopedia that assembled extracts of many books from classical antiquity that would have otherwise been lost. This work also helped standardize the use of the period (full stop), comma, and colon.

Since the early Middle Ages, Isidore has sometimes been called Isidore the Younger or Isidore Junior (Latin: Isidorus iunior), because of the earlier history purportedly written by Isidore of Córdoba.

=== Petrus Hispanus ===
(Latin: Petrus Hispanus; Portuguese and Spanish: Pedro Hispano; fl. 13th century) was the author of the Tractatus, later known as the Summulae Logicales, an important medieval university textbook on Aristotelian logic. As the Latin Hispania was considered to include the entire Iberian Peninsula, he is traditionally and usually identified with the medieval Portuguese scholar and ecclesiastic Peter Juliani, who was elected Pope John XXI in 1276. The identification is sometimes disputed, usually by Spanish authors, who claim the author of the Tractatus was a Castilian Blackfriar. He is also sometimes identified as Petrus Ferrandi Hispanus (d. 1254 x 1259).

=== Ramon Llull ===
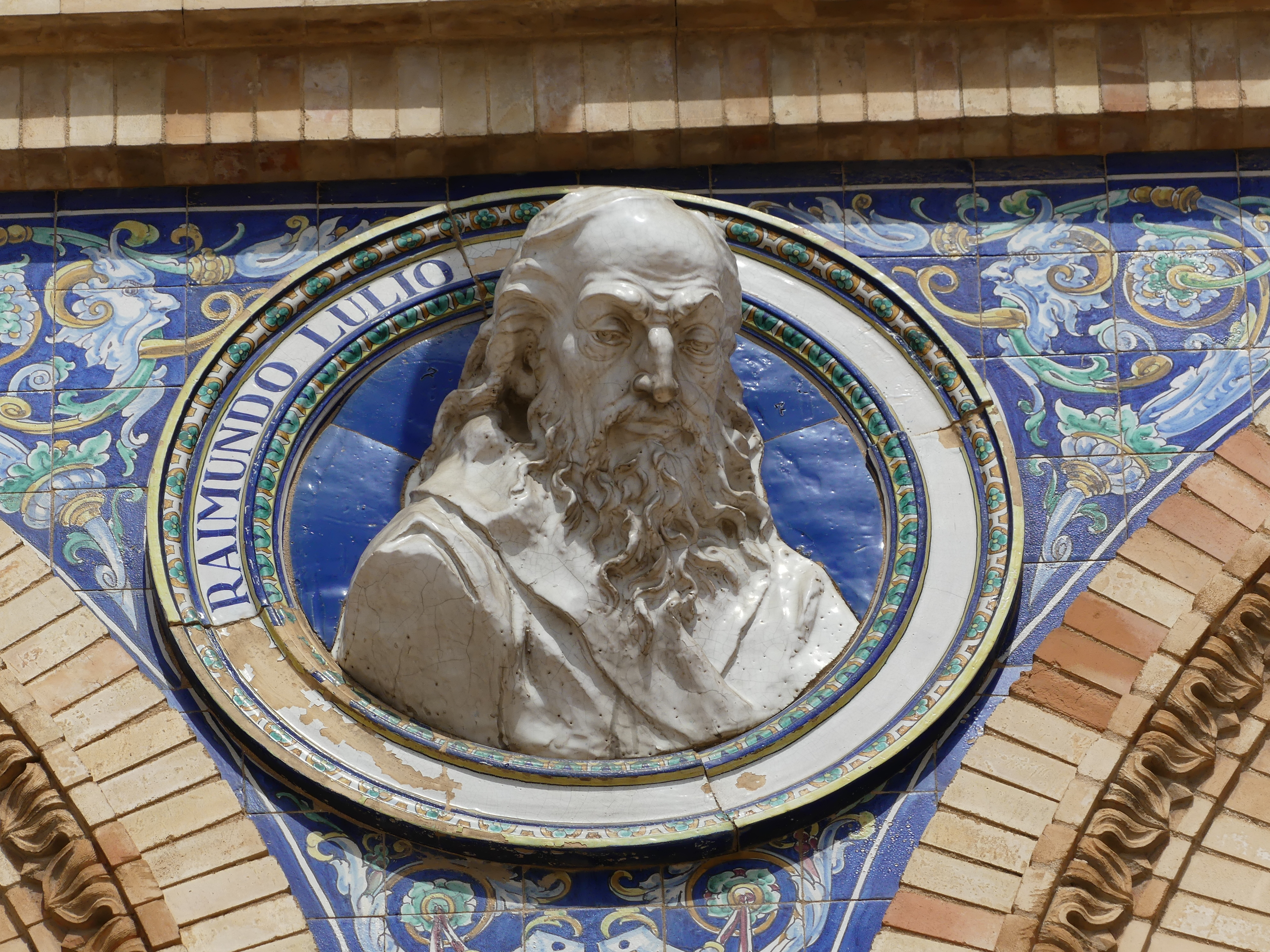
Ramon Llull

Ramon Llull was born in Palma de Mallorca in 1232, three years after James I of Aragon had successfully besieged and recaptured Majorca, after more than 300 years of Muslim rule. The king had brought Christian officials, tradesmen, and landowners to the island, among them Llull's father. Llull himself began his career at the king's court managing the royal household. He was married and had two children. His spare time was devoted to writing troubadour poetry. All this we know from Lull himself, because while in Paris in 1311 he dictated the Vita coaetanea, an autobiography modelled on Augustine of Hippo’s Confessions. As he describes it there, around the age of 30 he experienced a conversion: while writing a poem to a beautiful lady, he saw the crucified Lord appear on five subsequent evenings. Llull felt that from then on his life had to change, and so he devoted himself to converting the Jews and Muslims, in order to spare them eternal damnation. He strove to write the ‘best book in the world to confute their errors’ (unum librum, meliorem de mundo, contra errores infidelium; Vita coaetanea 6). Instead of enrolling in one of the newly founded universities, none of which taught what he really wanted to learn, Llull studied Arabic and Islamic philosophy and theology for nine years with an Arab slave. His vast knowledge of Christian theology, on the other hand, seems to have been acquired autodidactically. This accounts for the Neo-Platonic background of his theological writings and for the way his use of Aristotle is mediated by Islamic philosophers such as Al-Ghazali, whom he read in the original Arabic. Though a layman, he founded a monastery where future missionaries could learn Arabic and Hebrew. In 1311, he brought the Council of Vienne to the point of decreeing that lectureships in these oriental languages should be established at several European universities. Llull also took a number of missionary journeys to North Africa. By the time he died in 1316, he had written more than 250 books. In his works, Llull developed a daring vision of one single faith rather than different religions competing with each other. He thought this one and most desirable religion was already embodied in Christianity, or more exactly in its Catholic version, for he was convinced that the Christian belief offered more rational and more plausible explanations than any other belief. To explain this, he started from the attributes of God, for reflecting on them touched upon questions common to all three monotheistic religions in his time. But Llull had to learn that ‘infidels do not pay heed to the authorities of the faithful’ (infideles non stant ad auctoritates fidelium, et tamen stant ad rationes; Liber de demonstratione per aequiparantiam, prol. 4), such as the Bible, early Christian writers, and the prestigious theologians. Nevertheless, they follow rational arguments. They are guided by the reason God gave to all men and women when he created them. This explains why Llull is not in favour of argument based on authorities but on ‘commonsense’ reasoning. Even authorities like the Bible do not constitute a reliable common ground in his view. They can be interpreted in different ways, as debates between Christians and Jews, such as the Disputation of Barcelona in 1263, proved. Since Llull leaves the evidence of authority completely aside, he very rarely quotes any text literally, the Bible included. A notable exception is his favourite biblical quotation, Isaiah 7:9 in the Vetus Latina version: ‘unless you believe, you will not understand’ (nisi credideritis, non intelligetis).

=== Lullism ===
At his death, Llull left three complete collections of his works (at Genoa, Majorca and Paris), entrusting his disciples with the task of continuing to propagate them. The Parisian centre was associated with the Chartreuse of Vauvert, where a synthesis of his philosophical teaching was made. The Genoese nucleus was linked to the Spinola family, then to the monastery of San Girolamo della Cervara, where the logical aspects of Lullism were particularly explored. At Majorca and in Catalonia generally (and from there to Castile and southern Italy), the Lullist movement had connotations of religious radicalism: it was more diffuse and more in tune with the needs of the new spirituality (as is shown by the great intellectual work performed in favour of the Immaculate Conception, between the 14th and 15th centuries). Particularly well-documented is the case of Valencia, where disciples of Lull and of Arnaldus de Villa Nova seem to have been in agreement. The spread of Lullism was opposed in Catalonia by the Aragonese inquisitor Nicholas Eymerich, a Dominican who managed to obtain a condemnation from Pope Gregory XI in 1376 (annulled only in 1419 by Pope Martin V), and in France by Jean Gerson who, after the condemnation by the University of Paris in 1390, developed more than one attack on Lull culminating in the Contra Raimundum Lullum (Lyon, 1423). Meanwhile, at least from the second half of the 14th century, with the Liber de secretis naturae seu de quinta essentia, a rich pseudoepigraphical tradition of alchemical writings began to flourish around Lull's name, and the idea grew up of a fundamental agreement between his natural philosophy and alchemy. The manuscript tradition of these texts grew, with progressive additions and adaptations, and circulated throughout Europe until the 17th century. This phenomenon was interwoven with legendary motifs, and in the 17th century a union between Hermeticism and Lullism seemed inevitable. The suspicion of Heresy and the spread of pseudo-Lullian literature greatly influenced the character of Lull's reputation, and in a contradictory way. The problem of the relationship between Lull's own doctrine and the “Lullism” that developed in Humanism and the Renaissance, in France, Germany, Italy and the Iberian Peninsula, still remains open. Early and important evidence of Lullism appears at Padua in the early 15th century, with the lectures of Joan Bulons in 1433. From these first episodes, Lullist penetration would become quite strong in Italy, becoming concrete in figures like Giovanni Pico della Mirandola (1463–1494). The phenomenon had analogous aspects in France, with Jacques Lefèvre d'Étaples (1455–1536/1537) and Charles de Bovelles (1472–1533). The situation was different in Catalonia where a real Lullist school was established at Barcelona, and in Majorca where as early as c. 1453 Lullism was taught by friar Joan Llobet at Randa. In Germany, there was a more precise convergence of Lull's thought with the philosophical experience of Albertism at Cologne, a convergence that found mature expression in Heymeric de Campo and especially Nicholas of Cusa (1400/1401–1464), who became acquainted with Lullian texts on successive journeys to Italy. In Germany would also occur the most notable modern reflection on the Lullian philosophy, in the speculative work of Gottfried Wilhelm Leibniz (1646–1716), and conditions were ripe for a rebirth of Lullian studies through the erudite work of Ivo Salzinger, who published the Opera omnia Raimundi Lulli in the Mainz edition (1721–1742, 8 volumes).

=== Arnaldus de Villa Nova ===
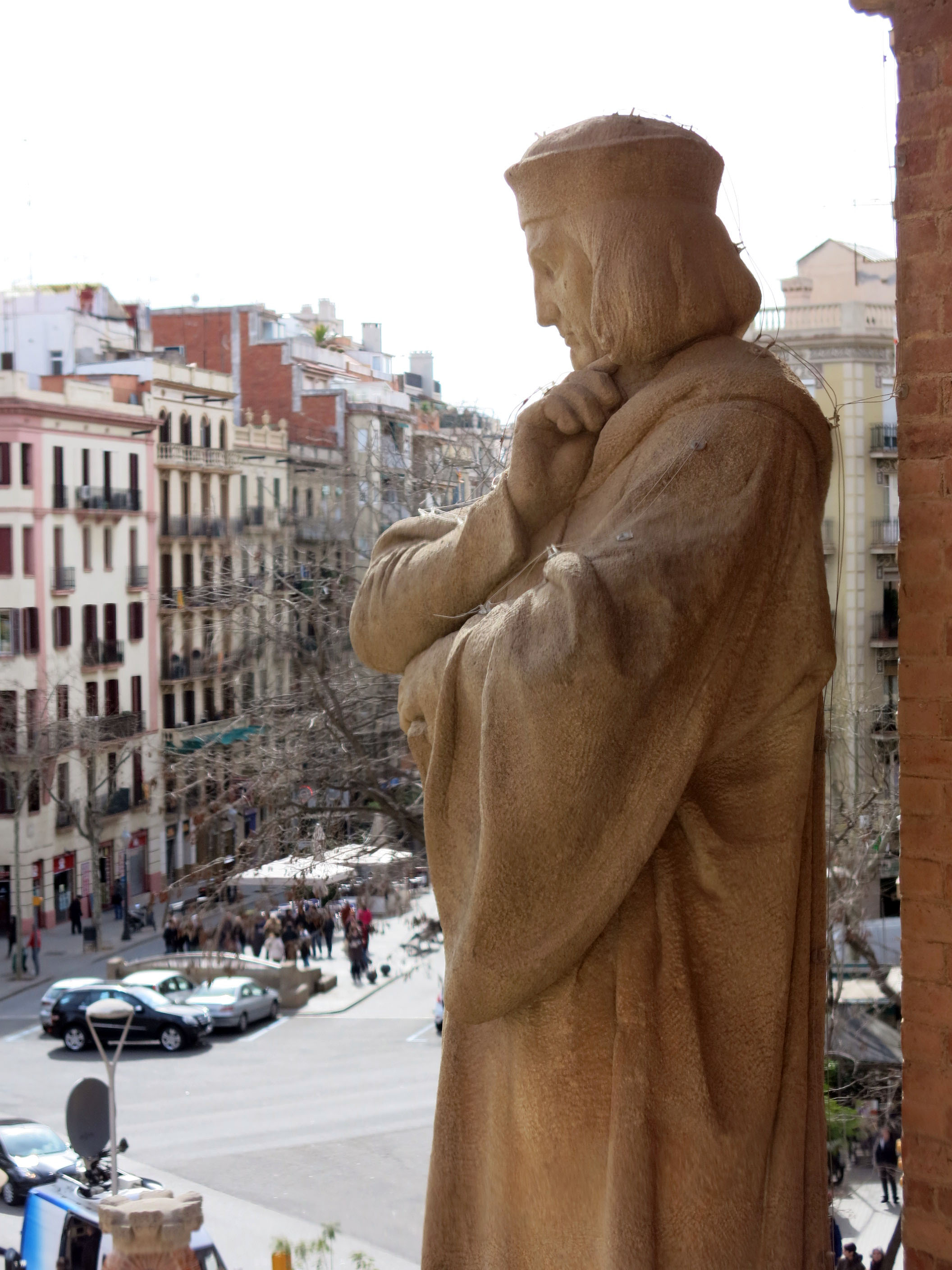
Arnaldus de Villa Nova

Arnaldus' early biography is poorly known. Although his date and place of birth are unknown, Arnaldus called himself a Catalan and from boyhood he lived at Valencia, in the territories recently reconquered by James I. In 1260 he was a student at the University of Montpellier. After 1280, having left Valencia for Barcelona, he became doctor to the royal house of Aragon-Catalonia and frequented the Dominican studium linguarum. In 1282 he translated Galen's De rigore, iectigatione et spasmo, and from 1290 he was a master of medicine at the University of Montpellier. He formed confidential relations with the sons of Peter the Great, in particular James II and Frederick III. It was during a diplomatic mission to Paris for James that he published his De tempore adventus Antichristi (1300). From this time on, his spiritual commitment increased: he had to sustain grave conflicts with the masters of the university, then with the Order of Preachers. Arnold was doctor to Pope Boniface VIII in 1300, then to the royal house of Provence and Pope Clement V, with whom he was connected even before he became pope. Counting on this set of relationships, he tried to assume the role of spiritual and political reformer, but his programme had some application only in Sicily. After his death and with the accession of John XXII, new attacks began on his work, which was condemned by a provincial court at Tarragona in 1316, even though, since the time of Boniface VIII, the pope had reserved the examination of Arnold's writings for himself. Arnold circulated collections of his writings, partly using his own private scriptorium, partly with the help of James II (at the University of Lleida) and Frederick III (at the Sicilian court). These summae were addressed to a wide public and brought together texts in Latin and/or the vernacular. Some of these collections, in accordance with his proposed programme of conversion, were translated into Greek. More occasional was his circulation of lectures and advice for Beguines while his frequent writings defending himself against the ecclesiastical and civil authorities were circulated in the same way as his spiritual works. Much of his theological output was destroyed after the condemnation of 1316, and important works like the Alia informatio beguinorum have survived only through the documentation of notaries. His numerous medical works consist of translations from the Arabic as well as writings on medical training, natural philosophy, clinical practice and hygiene. They were circulated through the traditional channels of the School or dedicated to important persons, and were in great demand until the first years of the 17th century. In some cases medical concerns were joined to spiritual ones. The authenticity of many works is uncertain, including the abundant alchemical output attributed to him, which is probably entirely apocryphal. Arnold's work was the basis of the birth of medicine as a scientific discipline: he studied its epistemological basis and took an active part in organising its study in universities (at Montpellier, in the name of Clement V, he dictated the curricula in 1309). He combined a precise knowledge of the Greek-Arabic scientific tradition with a conscious insistence on experiment. Of great importance was his contribution to medicines and their dosage. His spiritual doctrine was close to that of his radical Franciscan contemporaries: imminent end of the world (1378), coming of an Antichrist, the problem of recognising “true” Christians. These ideas led him to advocate a direct use of the Bible and a radical evangelism, and to give credit to new revelations and visionary experiences, his own and others. Much of his literary output consists of “autohagiography”, in which he represents his own experience as evidence of sanctity.

== Second scholasticism ==
Second scholasticism, also called Modern scholasticism, was a period of revival of scholastic system of philosophy and theology, in the 16th and 17th centuries. The scientific culture of second scholasticism surpassed its medieval source (Scholasticism) in the number of its proponents, the breadth of its scope, the analytical complexity, sense of historical and literary criticism, and the volume of editorial production, most of which remains hitherto little explored.

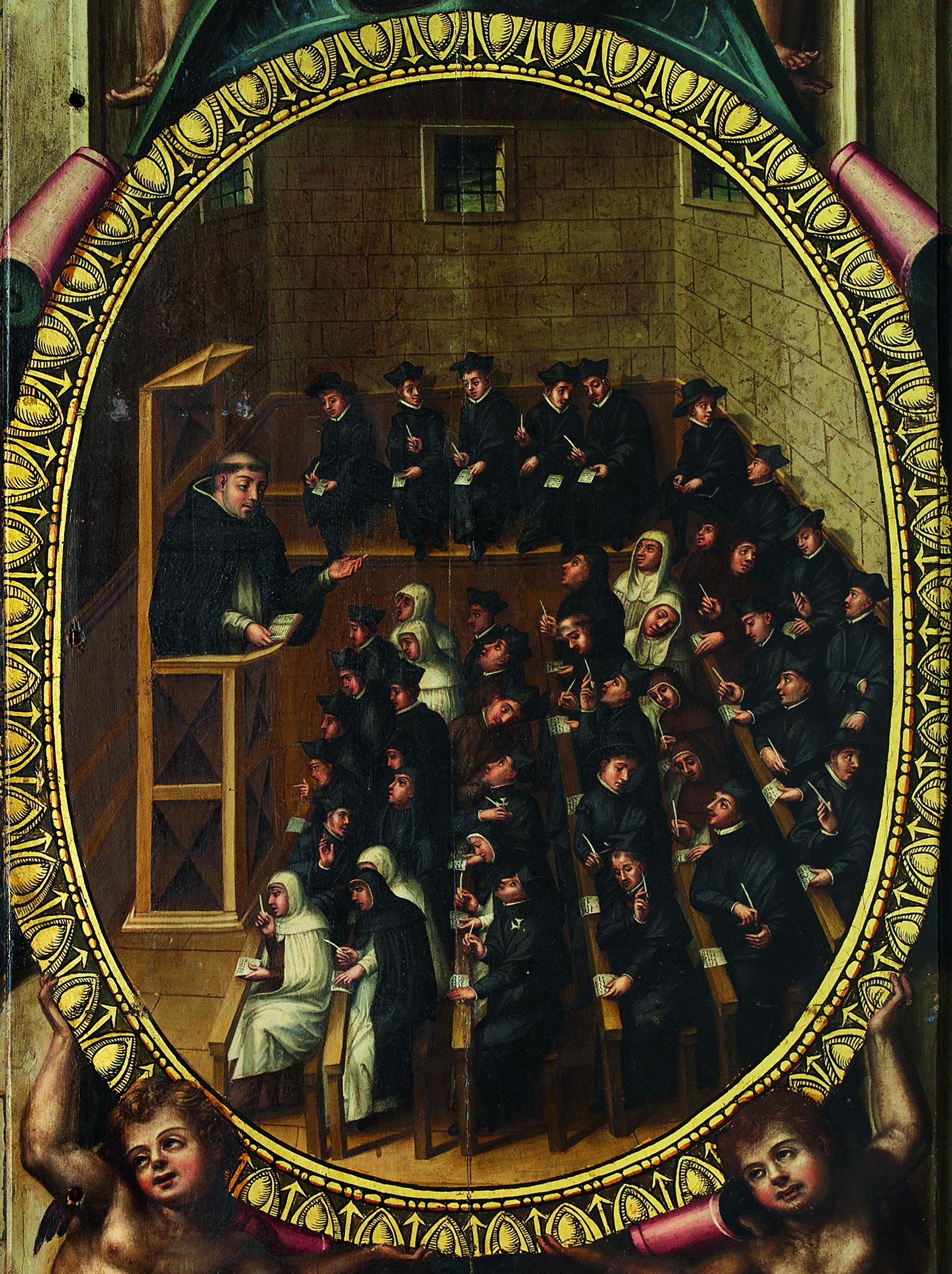
17th century classroom at the University of Salamanca

The School of Salamanca was the main theological, philosophical, economic, and juridical school of thought of Spain during Modern era and the main defender and disseminator of the second scholasticism. Its exponents turned to medieval High Scholasticism—personified by Thomas Aquinas—in order to solve philosophical problems with reference to the ancient classics such as Aristotle and in harmony with Church doctrine, and thus to prove the compatibility of reason and Christian faith. The philosophers of the School of Salamanca engaged also the contemporary movements of humanism and the Renaissance, thereby pointing beyond the horizons of Scholastic thought. Even though there are a number of points of contact with the theological disputes of the day, the School of Salamanca is fundamentally distinct from the Counter-Reformation and other sixteenth-century movements in Spanish philosophy, such as mysticism. The School of Salamanca aimed its powers of renewal at the key concepts of the period such as colonization and Reformation that overtaxed medieval intellectual patterns. Not only did internal theoretical difficulties in formulating arguments have to be overcome by reformulating Thomistic positions, but fundamentally new forms of political order also had to be thought out and ethically defensible solutions developed, frequently as a result of a fruitful joining of theological and philosophical ideas (such as mercy and freedom) with concepts from juridical and political practice (such as property and ruling power). Among the leading exponents of the School of Salamanca was the Dominican friar Francisco de Vitoria (c.1492–1546). The school's numbers also included the Dominicans Martín de Azpilcueta (1492–1586), Domingo de Soto (1494–1560), Melchor Cano (1509–1560), Diego de Covarrubias y Leyva (1512–1577), Fernando Vázquez de Menchaca (1512–1569), Bartolomé de Medina (1527–1580), Domingo Báñez (1528–1604), and Tomás de Mercado (1530–1576), as well as the Franciscan Alfonso de Castro (1495–1558). Other important representatives from the Dominicans were Bartolomé de Las Casas (1484–1566) and Juan Ginés de Sepúlveda (1490–1573).

=== Francisco de Vitoria ===
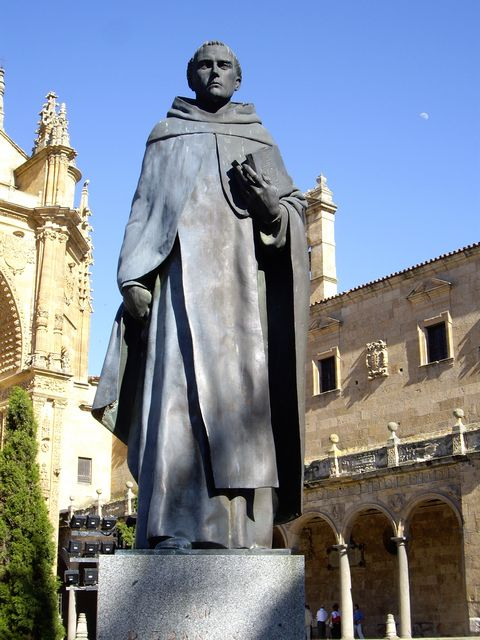
Statue of Francisco de Vitoria at San Esteban, Salamanca

Francisco De Vitoria was born in Burgos of a father who had assumed the name of his native city and of a mother descended from converted Jews. The young Vitoria arrived in Paris in 1507 to study at the Dominican studium of Saint-Jacques. There the Flemish nominalist-turned-Thomist Peter Crockaert was effecting the revival of Thomistic Scholasticism and entrusted Vitoria in 1512 with editing the Secunda secundae of Thomas Aquinas's Summa Theologica. Vitoria edited other works of moral and spiritual theology in Paris, where he received a doctorate in the Faculty of Theology in 1522 and taught in 1522/23. Assigned to teach at the Dominican studium in Valladolid in 1523, he was elected in 1526 by the students of the University of Salamanca to the "prima" chair in theology, which he held until his death on 12 August 1546. In his third year at Salamanca, Vitoria abandoned the centuries-long tradition of teaching from the Sentences of Peter Lombard and began to comment instead on the works of Thomas. This innovation was widely imitated in Spain and elsewhere and had important consequences for the future teaching of theology in Catholic faculties and for the theological approaches of the Council of Trent. Among his many pupils were Domingo de Soto, Melchor Cano, Bartolomé de Medina, Tomás de Chaves, and Domingo Báñez. Vitoria's political thought strongly influenced the work of Robert Bellarmine and Francisco Suárez. Although Vitoria published nothing during his tenure at Salamanca, his students undertook this work after his death. A manual of sacramental theology based on his notes was reprinted over eighty times before 1612. His Relectiones theologicae appeared posthumously in 1557 in Lyon and were reprinted eight times in the sixteenth and seventeenth centuries in Spain, Italy, Germany, and the Low Countries. The Relección was an annual formal lecture to the whole university in which Vitoria summed up his lectures given the previous year. He treated such questions as civil and ecclesiastical authority, homicide, charity, marriage, magic, usury, and the authority of popes and general councils. In 1539 and 1540 he turned his attention to the moral and legal problems posed by the Spanish colonization of the Americas. His treatises De Indis recenter inventis and De iure belli Hispanorum in barbaros influenced subsequent imperial legislation, especially the "New Law for the Indies" in 1542, which sought to reduce the brutality of exploitation of the American native peoples. In De Indis Vitoria upheld the natural rights of the aborigines as legal possessors of their property and governors of their lands. But he allowed that a more enlightened state, especially a Christian one like Spain, might assume government of a backward people—as the "Indians" appeared to be—provided this government was for the welfare of the latter and not merely for the profit of the former. The rights of missionaries to preach the gospel were to take precedence, and the emperor's duties to protect converts was paramount. Thus, while Vitoria's teaching broke new ground in the matter of native rights, it failed to block possible avenues of abuse. His doctrine is thus more ambivalent than that of his fellow Dominican Bartolomé de Las Casas, who is the more thoroughgoing champion of the aborigines. Vitoria's use of Thomas Aquinas, who had drawn on the political thought of Aristotle, presumed the natural rights of the state. Although God is its ultimate cause, the state enjoys full power and authority over the things necessary to its continuance and to the well-being of its citizens, who alone may determine the mode of power and its delegation to individuals. The same natural law likewise governs international relations: the world as a whole (totus orbis) is analogous to a single state and can thus create a supranational authority to determine laws appropriate to and binding on all nations. In the twentieth century these theories have earned Vitoria the title "Father of International Law" and have made him the patron of several national and international associations. Vitoria maintained a correspondence with several humanists. Juan Luis Vives assured Erasmus of Vitoria's admiration. During the inquisition into Erasmus's works held at Valladolid (1527), however, Vitoria took a middle position, opposing a general censure of Erasmus but holding that some of his positions were dangerous and even heretical.

=== Domingo de Soto ===
Domingo de Soto studied at the universities of Alcalá and Paris, and in 1524 entered the Dominican Order. In 1532 he became professor of theology at Salamanca. In 1545 he was sent at the behest of Charles V to the Council of Trent, and he subsequently served as the emperor's confessor. In 1552 he succeeded Melchor Cano as the principal theologian at Salamanca. His most important work was De iustitia et de iure (1553/54), in which he proposed that reason (rationis ordinatio) was the mechanism by which laws should be evaluated. He also took the view that international law (jus gentium) was a part of the law of specific communities (later termed positive law) rather than a moral or natural law. Soto's erudition, which was distinguished even by the standards of those in attendance at the Council of Trent, ranged far beyond theology and law. In his commentaries on Aristotle (1545) he outlined a theory of the trajectory of missiles that anticipated (and may have influenced) Galileo's Law of Fall.

=== Melchor Cano ===
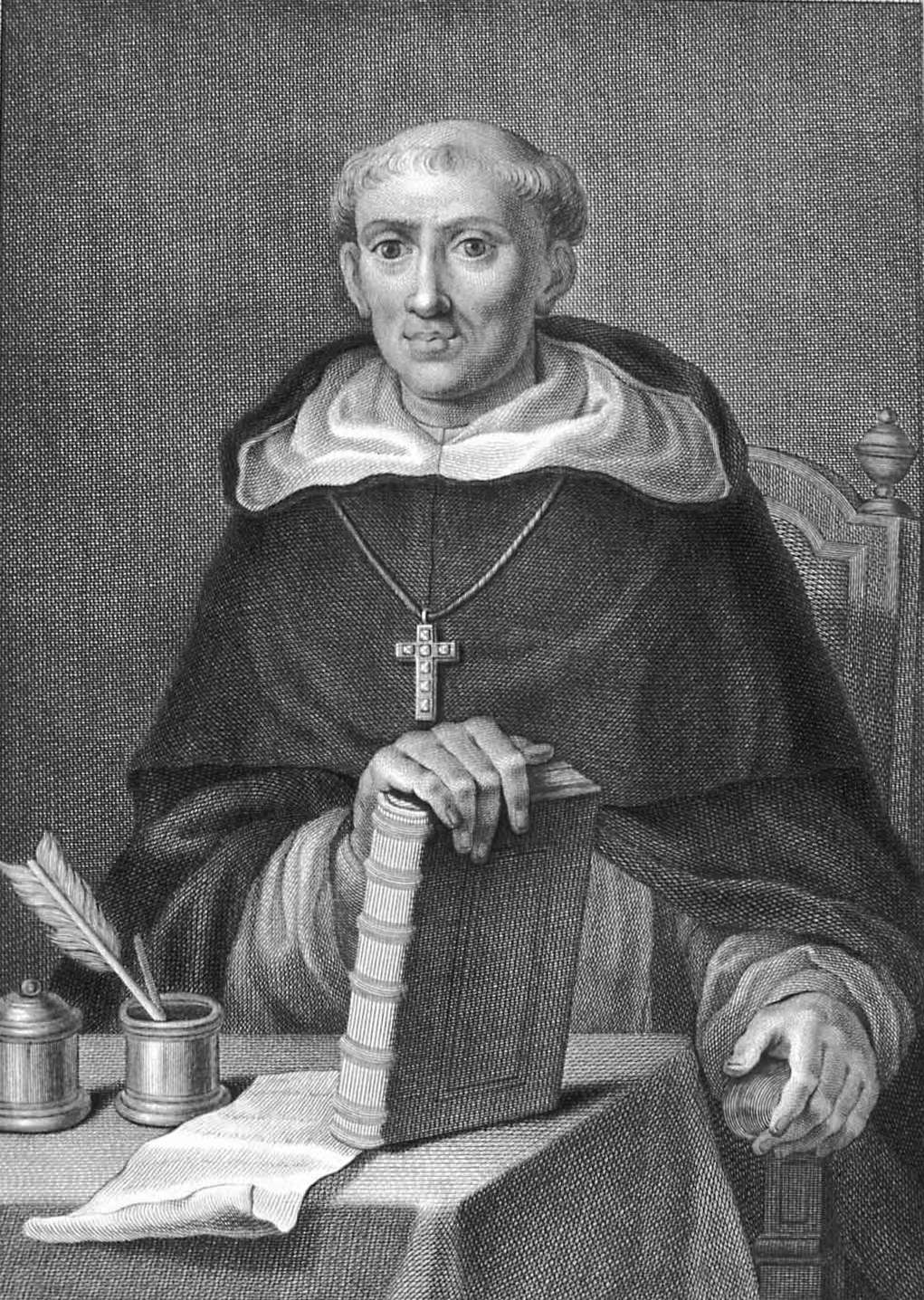
Melchor Cano

Melchor Cano studied at the University of Salamanca (1527–1531) and became the favorite disciple of Francisco de Vitoria. Cano taught at the Dominican college of Saint Gregory in Valladolid (1533–1542), held the principal chair of theology at the University of Alcalá (1542–1546), and succeeded his mentor Vitoria at the University of Salamanca (1546–1552). At Trent, he led the council away from compromise with Protestantism and toward its reaffirmation of the real presence of Christ in the Eucharist, transubstantiation, the sacrificial dimension of the Mass, and private auricular confession. Cano's conservatism also led him to distrust the new order founded by Ignatius of Loyola (1491–1556), the Society of Jesus, which he considered a sectarian movement with heretical leanings. Ever faithful to his mentor, Vitoria—who was one of the principal defenders of the rights of the indigenous peoples of the Americas against their Spanish conquerors—Cano became a formidable opponent of those who considered the Indians inferior beings and "natural" slaves. Cano's chief opponent in this controversy was Juan Ginés de Sepúlveda, chaplain and official chronicler to Emperor Charles V. When Sepúlveda defended the right of Charles to wage war upon and enslave the Indians in Democrates secundus sive de justis causis belli apud Indos (1544), Cano ensured the book's condemnation by the faculties of Salamanca and Alcalá. Moreover, Sepúlveda's defeat at the hands of Cano and other Dominicans in a debate held in Valladolid in 1550 led to the enactment of laws protecting the rights of native peoples in the New World. Awarded the bishopric of the Canary Islands in 1552, he resigned from teaching at Salamanca. Nonetheless, Cano's close involvement with the royal court prevented him from taking up residence there; unwilling to serve as an absentee bishop, he resigned this post in 1554 . His final years were filled with controversy. In 1556 King Philip II went to war against Pope Paul IV—who had allied himself with France—and Cano defended Philip's right to contend against the pope as a temporal ruler. At Rome, Cano was accused of challenging pontifical authority, and though he was twice elected provincial of Castile by his fellow Dominicans, Pope Paul IV refused to confirm him. Cano's most enduring legacy is his contribution to theological methodology. Cano and other representatives of the School of Salamanca sought to enlarge the scope of theology by turning away from the abstract dialectics of Scholasticism and by placing a greater emphasis on ethical concerns. Like all Thomists, Cano defended the capacity of humans to understand or even intuit the truths revealed by God, and he engaged in an exegesis of the ius naturale, or law of nature. Cano's De Locis Theologicis (published posthumously in 1563) owes much to Rodolphus Agricola's De Inventione Dialectica (1548), as interpreted by Francisco de Vitoria. This opus outlines ten sources, or loci, of theology. Aimed squarely against the paradigm of sola scriptura, Cano's theological method sought religious truth in a variety of sources, which included not just the Bible but also oral tradition; the pronouncements of councils, bishops, and popes; the writings of the Fathers; and even the teachings of pagan philosophers and the testimony of human history as interpreted by natural reason. Cano's method was enthusiastically embraced by post-Tridentine theologians, and was taken to greater heights by some of his Jesuit followers in the School of Salamanca; four centuries later such influential thinkers as Joseph Maréchal and Karl Rahner continued to build on its foundations. The spirit of this positive or fundamental theology, as it came to be known, was neatly summarized by Cano in his De Locis: "Whoever constructs a theology unlinked to reason, and measures dogmas through Scripture alone, does nothing for theology, or for the faith, or for humanity."

=== Luis de Molina ===
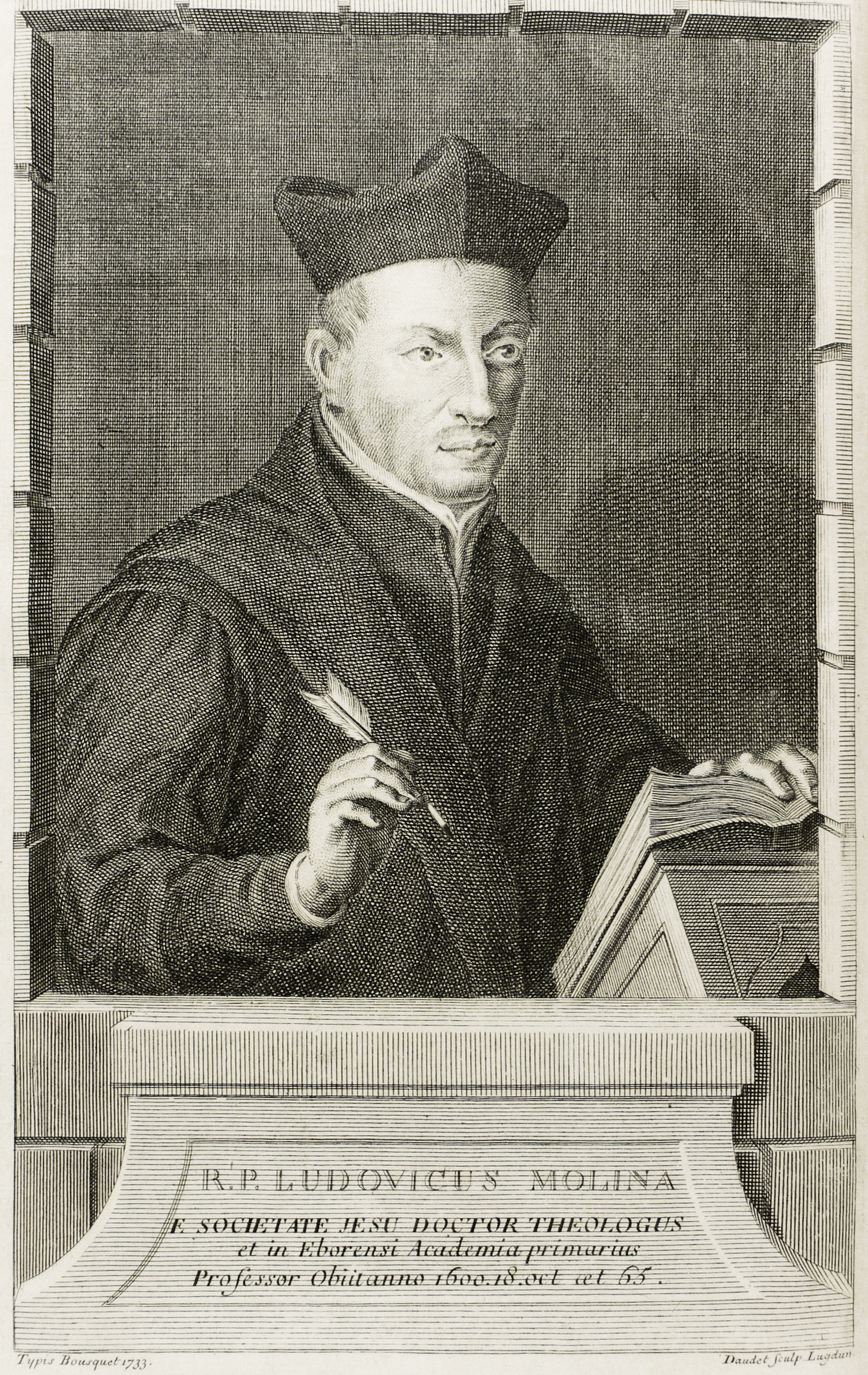
Luis de Molina

Born in Cuenca in Castile, Molina was received into the Society of Jesus at Alcalá in 1553. In Portugal, after studies at Coimbra, he taught theology at Évora from 1568 until 1583, when he was freed from teaching to prepare his lecture materials for publication. Molina began a commentary on part I of Thomas Aquinas's Summa theologiae, but his manuscript was so extensive on questions concerning divine foreknowledge, providence, and predestination, all in relation to free choice, that he lifted his treatment of these and brought out a separate work, the Concordia liberi arbitrii cum Gratiæ donis, divina præscientia, providentia, prædestinatione et reprobatione (1588). His two-volume commentary on part 1 of the Summa treated natural knowledge of God, the Trinity, creation, and the angels (1592). But his main project after 1590 was De iustitia et iure, treating the major questions of personal and socioeconomic morality. He oversaw the publication of the first three volumes, while four others came out posthumously (1609). In 1600 he was called to teach moral theology in Madrid, but he died there shortly after arriving. Molina was criticized, especially by Dominicans, for making the graced free decisions of the will a cause or precondition of divine predestination to eternal salvation. Molina distinguished in God various types of foreknowledge, by one of which, called scientia media, God knows the outcome of human choices in the hypothesis of the creation of a certain order of reality. God's decree predestining some persons to salvation is then logically subsequent to their foreseen meritorious actions. Against this view, the Thomists of Salamanca, headed by Domingo Báñez, denied such intermediate divine knowledge and held that predestination is prior to foreseen human meritorious actions. The dispute was argued but not resolved before a papal tribunal from 1597 to 1607, with both theories in the end being permitted.

=== Francisco Suárez ===
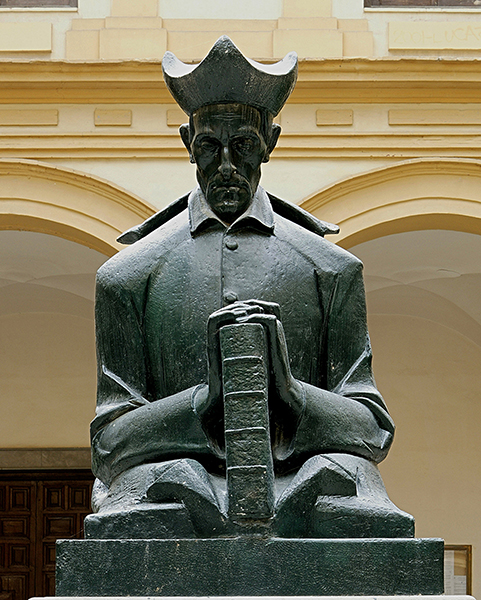
Bust of Francisco Suárez in his native Granada

Francisco Suárez was born at Granada, Spain; his father, a successful lawyer, early destined him for the priesthood. He entered the Jesuits in 1564. After a weak beginning, he soon became a brilliant student at the University of Salamanca, which was then a center of revived Thomism. Upon completing his Jesuit training, he taught philosophy briefly at Segovia (1571–1574); he then devoted six years to teaching theology at various Jesuit colleges. The lecture notes from these courses became a quarry for his later publications. In 1580 he was called to teach theology at the prestigious Jesuit Roman College, where he lectured on the Summa Theologiae of Thomas Aquinas, but because of failing health he returned to Spain and occupied a chair of theology at Alcalá (1585–1593). His last years at Alcalá de Henares were marked by a bitter rivalry with his fellow Jesuit, the more flamboyant Gabriel Vázquez, so Suárez was happy to move to Salamanca, where he taught and wrote until 1597. He spent the last period of his life (1597–1617) at the University of Coimbra, at the behest of Philip II, who wanted to enhance the prestige of the Portuguese university. Suárez's personal life was that of a pious priest and largely uneventful. His health was never robust, and his teaching duties cut into the time he would have preferred to devote to preparing his manuscripts for publication. Many were left only partially revised at his death and were published posthumously; others, most notably his commentaries on Aristotle, were never published. The 1856 Paris edition of his works ran to twenty-eight volumes. Suárez's main philosophical works were his treatise on the soul (Lyon, 1621) and especially his Disputationes metaphysicae (Salamanca, 1597), which enjoyed great popularity (eighteen editions in the century after its publication) not only in Catholic countries but also in Protestant Germany, where it contributed to the renewed scholastic reshaping of philosophy and theology during the age of Protestant orthodoxy. While working within the regnant Aristotelian tradition, Suárez's philosophical works develop their own order of presentation. Written in humanistic Latin, his works are systematic and clear but often prolix; they draw on a wide reading in philosophers from Plato to his own day. His book on metaphysics is noteworthy for rejecting the Thomistic real distinction between essence and existence. The most important of Suárez's theological works were his extensive commentaries on the Summa theologiae of Thomas Aquinas, especially the tracts De Deo Uno et Trino (Lisbon, 1606), De Angelis (Lyon, 1620), De Opere sex Dierum (Lyon, 1621), and De Legibus (Coimbra, 1612). The last of these tracts has been much studied in the twentieth century, and along with the works of Francisco de Vitoria and Hugo Grotius it laid the intellectual foundations of international law. In choosing to write on the Summa rather than Peter Lombard's Sententiae, Suárez was following the precedent set a half century earlier by Francisco de Vitoria at Salamanca and thereby contributed to making Thomism central to revived scholasticism, even though he often departed from the teachings of Thomas on particular issues. Suárez's Opuscula sex (Madrid, 1599) contain his teaching on grace, human freedom, and God's foreknowledge—a set of questions then under bitter dispute by Jesuits and Dominicans. Suárez does not go so far as his fellow Jesuit Luis de Molina in stressing human freedom in the process of salvation. At the request of the Jesuit general Claudio Acquaviva, Suárez wrote a four-volume study of religious orders, De virtute et statu religionis (Coimbra, 1608–1625); much of it was devoted to a defense of the innovations begun by the Jesuits and by other new orders of the Counter-Reformation. His main contribution to anti-Protestant polemics was his long Defensio Fidei catholicae et Apostolicae adversus Anglicanae sectae errores (Coimbra, 1613, partial English translation in 1944), which was largely directed against the oath that King James I demanded from his Catholic subjects. James I had it burned at Saint Paul's in London and arranged for refutations. Its statements about papal power also led to its being burned by the Parlement of Paris, and it provided Gallicans with ammunition against the Jesuits. Suárez was the culmination of the scholastic revival in Counter-Reformation Spain and the greatest and most systematic theologian among the early Jesuits. Few of his works have been translated into English, but a distinctive Suárezian school flourished among Spanish Jesuits into the twentieth century.

=== Gabriel Vázquez ===
Gabriel Vázquez was born in Belmonte de Miranda in 1549. He entered the Jesuit Order in 1569, and taught moral theology at the Jesuit colleges of Madrid, Ocaña, and Alcalá de Henares. He held a chair of Theology at the Roman College from 1585 to 1591, and then returned to Alcalá de Henares, where he taught for the rest of his life. Vázquez was a scholar of immense learning, and had a remarkable command of patristic scholarship. His most important work is his Commentarii ac disputationes, a huge commentary on the Summa Theologica of Thomas Aquinas (8 vols., 1598–1615). He was a passionate controversialist in the debate on the nature of Grace. An immensely influential philosopher, Vázquez was the probable source of Descartes's mind-body dualism and of Immanuel Kant's argument from morality.

=== Antonio Pérez ===
Antonio Pérez Valiende de Navas was one of the most important Spanish theologians of the first half of the seventeenth century. He was born at Puente de la Reina (Navarre) in 1599 and entered the Society of Jesus in 1613. He studied philosophy and theology at the colleges of Medina del Campo and Salamanca, under the authority of Pedro Hurtado de Mendoza and Benito de Robles (1571–1616), an influential teacher of illustrious philosophers such as Rodrigo de Arriaga. He then embarked on a brilliant teaching career: first at the Jesuit colleges of Valladolid and Salamanca, and then at the prestigious Roman College, where he succeeded to another major figure of Jesuit theology, John de Lugo, who had just been elevated to the rank of cardinal. After six years of teaching, he was suddenly fired and sent back to Spain, officially because his theories on God and the Trinity were judged ‘unheard of’ and his lectures ‘obscure’ and ‘incomprehensible’. He died of a sudden illness on the road, in the small town of Corral de Almaguer. Pérez had not yet published a single book, but his reputation as a difficult, demanding, and highly original teacher was already made way beyond the classrooms of Salamanca and Rome. Some of his pupils would do their best to publish a couple of posthumous volumes. Everybody referred to him as the ‘extraordinary theologian’ (theologus mirabilis), even the wily Francesco Sforza Pallavicino, his Italian colleague and rival. Despite Pérez's importance, his work has received very little attention, for two reasons. First, because the second grand generation of the Jesuits keeps being overshadowed by the first powerful generation of authors such as Robert Bellarmine, Francisco Suárez, or Luis de Molina, and historians do not sufficiently acknowledge the strong difference between both. Second, due to his untimely death, Pérez's work has been insufficiently printed, and still subsists mainly in the form of thousands of manuscript pages scattered in various Spanish and Roman libraries, even though these manuscripts enjoyed wide circulation in the seventeenth century.

Pérez took over from his master Benito de Robles the general project of ‘staying close to Augustine in metaphysical matters’ (rebus metaphysicis proximum fuisse Augustino; In primam 87a). This is a strong statement: in early modern scholasticism at large, Augustine was a source for almost every aspect of theology, but never for metaphysics. This shows the originality of Pérez's project: he wanted to develop in scholastic fashion a truly neo-Augustinian conception of being and God, his attributes and relationship to world. The problems that had kept entire generations of theologians busy before him—namely the problems of grace and free will—appear only secondary to Pérez, although he strongly emphasized the role of grace in our acts of knowledge or faith, refuting thereby the naturalism of previous generations. But his lifelong project was to read Augustine as a metaphysician. In the Aristotelian tradition, the object of metaphysics is being qua being. Pérez was of course schooled in that Aristotelian scholastic tradition, but he undermines it with insights taken from Augustine. Pérez believes that the major shortcoming of classical Aristotelian metaphysics was the idea that only ‘being’ can be known: but what about our knowledge of lacks, of wants, of fictions, of desires, i.e. of things that do not have reality? The paradigm case was the problem of the not-yet present future in relation to God's knowledge. Pérez was dissatisfied with all the classical medieval and early modern solutions, which had tried to solve the problem of God's knowledge of the non-existing future by modifying (and enhancing) God's ways of knowing. Pérez and his school advocated a new ontological solution: one has to grant to non-existent beings a form of ‘being’, in the same way that lacks, shadows, or wants have ‘presence’. His inspiration was Augustine's idea that for the beauty of the world, obscurity is as necessary as light, or that for the beauty of language, silence is as necessary as sound (cf. De natura boni, ch. 16). Pérez however refrained from the tendency of some of his contemporaries to grant a complete positive ontological status to negative objects. He did not want to admit a realm of ‘eternal negations’, distinct from God, which he rejects as entia abusiva (‘superfluous entities’). This would indeed amount to a form of metaphysical Manichaeism, which he obviously rejects on Augustinian grounds. His solution is therefore to admit that negative states of affairs exist only insofar as their presence would be ‘incompatible’ or ‘incompossible’ with the presence of some other states of affairs. The negative being of obscurity means therefore that where light is posited, obscurity is incompossible. An entire school of thought called ‘Incompatibilism’ (Incompossibilistae) emerged from Pérez's insights and led to numerous discussions in Spanish and also Central European colleges. Pérez dedicated some of the most speculative pages of his works to a new philosophical description of God, or more exactly of the ‘Deity’ (deitas), as he calls it. He gave a new interpretation of Augustine's classical theory of the relation between God and Platonic ideas. According to Pérez, Augustine's teaching meant that God was himself the idea of the world, and that no distinction could therefore be established between God and his attributes, as the scholastics usually did by differentiating God's essence from God's acts of knowledge (and arguing about the conceptual status of divine ideas). As early as 1630, Pérez taught that the Deity must be considered in pure simplicity and as the perfect idea of the world, without any distinctions among his attributes. Following again Augustine (and his master Pedro Hurtado de Mendoza), he underlined that God must be considered both as the creator of essences and existences in the world (auctor essentiarum). He strongly criticized the essentialist tendencies of most previous Jesuit theologians (such as Suárez or Gabriel Vázquez) who claimed that the objects of divine knowledge were actually possible or true in themselves, without any relation to the divine attributes of power or science. Pérez on the contrary wants to give to God a total supremacy over both possibles and impossibles, which he expresses in a formula that would become recurrent among neo-Augustinian Jesuit metaphysicians of the second half of the seventeenth century, namely that God is ‘the possibility of possibles and impossibility of impossibles’ (possibilitas possibilium et impossibilitas impossibilium). In the last stance, this also means that any statement about the order of the world is actually a statement about God himself.

Pérez's main originality lies in the way he tried to express classical insights of Augustine in the highly sophisticated language of early modern Aristotelian scholasticism. He tried to found Augustine's conception of ‘true religion’ (vera religio) on solid metaphysical grounds, leaving no room for heresy. Pérez had a huge influence on subsequent generations of Spanish philosophers. It was from Pérez's teaching onwards that Jesuit moral philosophy would also take the turn towards rigorism, fostered by other Navarrese Jesuits such as Martín de Esparza (1606–89) and Miguel de Elizalde (1617–78), and consumed during the generalate of Thyrsus González de Santalla (1624–1711, General from 1687), himself an almost orthodox ‘Pérezian’ in metaphysical and speculative matters. It also meant the progressive abandoning of the rationalist and naturalistic conceptions of faith developed by John de Lugo and a victory of a new form of fideism which could again fully claim Augustine's authority.

=== Sebastián Izquierdo ===
Sebastián Izquierdo was born in 1601 at Alcaraz, in the Castilian province of Albacete. He joined the Jesuits on November 17, 1623, and studied at the Jesuit college in Alcalá de Henares and the prestigious Colegio Imperial de Madrid. He taught Philosophy and Theology at Alcalá, Murcia and Madrid. He became Rector of the colleges of Murcia and Madrid and was present at the eleventh General Congregation of the Society of Jesus at Rome, at which time he was named assistant to the Superior General for Spain and the West Indies. In Rome he befriended among others the well-known German polymath Athanasius Kircher. In 1659, he published in Lyon his monumental philosophical work Pharus scientiarum (The Lighthouse of Sciences). He died at Rome on 20 February 1681.

Although Izquierdo is virtually forgotten nowadays, he was an important figure 17th-century philosophy. Izquierdo was a follower of the Spanish medieval philosopher Ramon Llull. He was also strongly influenced by Bacon's empiricism. In his Pharus scientiarum he emphasized the need for a universal science that could be valid for all human knowledge (scientia de scientia or arte general del saber). It would be akin to the manner in which the Lullian Ars Magna was applicable to the entire ladder of creation. At the same time, Izquierdo advocated mathematizing the ars lulliana, and in the course of his exposition illustrates how Llull's letter combinations could be replaced by number combinations. The German Jesuit Athanasius Kircher, influenced by the Pharus scientiarum, wrote his immense Ars magna sciendi an attempt to make the Lullian Ars a "science of science" suitable for the preparation of an encyclopedia of all human knowledge.

Historians of mathematics remember Izquierdo especially in connection with combinatorics, to which he devoted Disputation 29 (De Combinatione). He was the first to discuss the number of k-combinations from a given set of n elements. Izquierdo influenced several contemporary philosophers, such as the Spanish Juan Caramuel and Tomás Vicente Tosca and the German Gaspar Knittel and Gottfried Wilhelm Leibniz; the latter, in particular, quoted the Disputatio de Combinatione, in his De Arte Combinatoria (1666). The Disputatio 29 «De Combinatione», was rescued from oblivion and studied in depth by the Jesuit historian of philosophy Ramón Ceñal, who not only translated it from Latin but also carried out an exhaustive study of it published by the Instituto de España.

=== Juan Caramuel y Lobkowitz ===
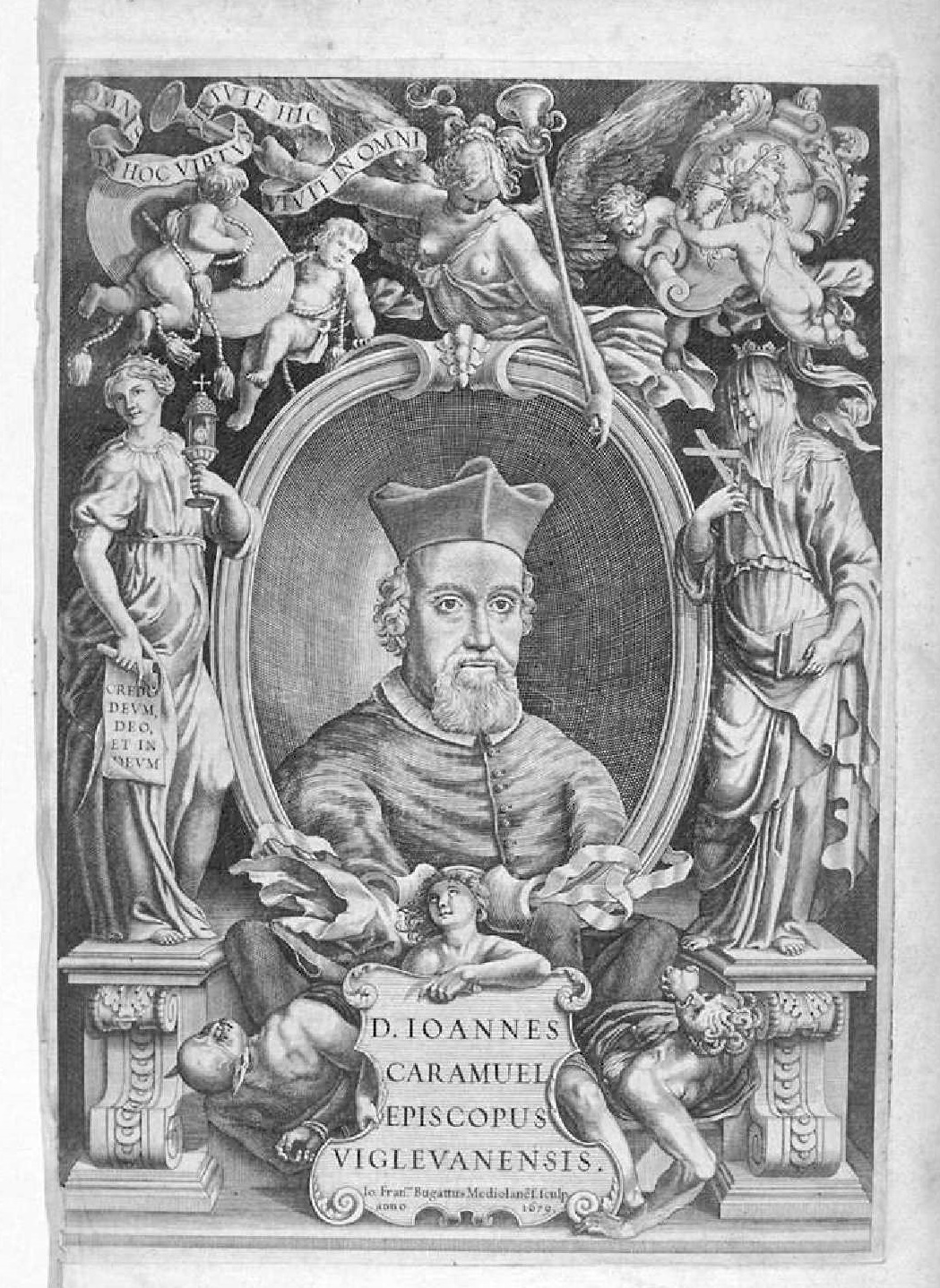
Juan Caramuel Lobkovitz

Juan Caramuel y Lobkowitz was born in 1606 in Madrid, to parents of Luxembourgish, German, and Bohemian ancestry. He was educated at the universities of Alcalá and Salamanca, mainly by orthodox Thomists such as the Dominicans John of St. Thomas (João Poinsot, 1589–1644) and Francisco de Araujo (1580–1664) as well as the Cistercian Pedro de Lorca (1521–1621). He probably also attended the last classes of Agustín Antolínez (1554–1626), in that time the major theologian of the Augustinian Order in Salamanca. In 1625 he became a novice in the Cistercian Order. After several years spent in monasteries in Spain, he was dispatched to the University of Louvain. There he took part in numerous controversies, fuelled by the presence of the Jansenist party, the Jesuit theologians, and the Franciscans. In 1638, he obtained his doctorate of theology, but failed to gain a chair at the university. Through intercession of the King of Spain, Philip IV, and of Fabio Chigi (1599–1667), he was sent to southern Germany and became engaged in Catholic–Protestant controversies. Having become close to the Emperor Ferdinand III (1637–57), Caramuel was then appointed to the post of abbot of the Benedictine monastery of Montserrat in Counter-Reformation Prague. He left the Bohemian capital in 1655, the year his old friend Chigi was elevated to the papacy as Alexander VII. After two confused years in Rome, he was appointed, for still unclear reasons, to the poor and remote bishopric of Campagna-Satriano. Fifteen years later, in 1673, he moved to his final destination, the more comfortable see of Vigevano, where he died on 7 September 1682.

Caramuel was the perfect incarnation of the Baroque polymath and most biographers refer to him only with superlatives. A restless writer, he published ‘a volume of books equal to the years of his life’, as his epitaph says. His interests ranged from grammar and natural languages to architecture, astronomy, and music. A substantial part of his publications was dedicated to philosophy and theology. Caramuel was the first to coin the expression ‘fundamental theology’: he believed that theology as a science must be based upon axioms (fundamenta), both speculative and practical, from which one could deduce various consequences. The speculative axioms are those which confer certainty on the human mind: among these, we find human liberty, God and his revelation as first truth, the certainty and infallibility of the Roman Church, the truthfulness of the pope, the congregations, and the rota, and also the definitions of the major universities and scholars, down the authority of demons, sense perception, and probable opinions. The practical axioms are founded in divine and human authority, and Caramuel treats them according to the Aristotelian table of categories (discussing for instance the quality and quantity of law). Although educated in the Thomist tradition, Caramuel firmly believed in the humanist ideal of nullius addictus iurare in verba magistri (‘not to swear slavishly by the words of any master’). He refused to be enrolled in a specific school of thought and felt free to choose among all the authorities that would best suit his project of constructing a renovated Christian philosophy.

== Spanish Universalist School ==
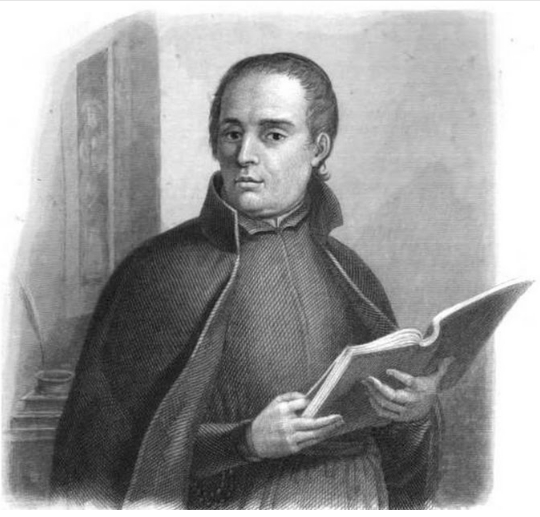
Juan Andrés y Morell

The Spanish Universalist School was a group of 18th-century Jesuit intellectuals, exiled to Italy, who focused on a humanistic and scientific approach to knowledge, emphasizing universality and globalization. The school's formation was largely due to the expulsion of the Jesuits from Spain and their subsequent exile to Italy. It largely matured in northern Italy and is considered the second great Hispanic intellectual moment after the School of Salamanca.

Key figures of the School include Juan Andrés, Lorenzo Hervás, and Stefano Arteaga. Their work contributed significantly to the history of European sciences and letters, as well as the history of ideas.

The key aspect of the School is the focus on Universality: its members believed in a broad, interconnected view of knowledge, encompassing various disciplines and cultures. They valued both the humanities and scientific progress, seeing them as complementary rather than separate, and developed a comparative approach to history and knowledge, influencing the field of comparative literature and cultural studies.

The Spanish Universalist School's work has been the subject of recent scholarly attention, with efforts to reconstruct their contributions to the history of ideas and their impact on the concept of globalization.

== The counterrevolutionary school ==
=== Juan Donoso Cortés ===
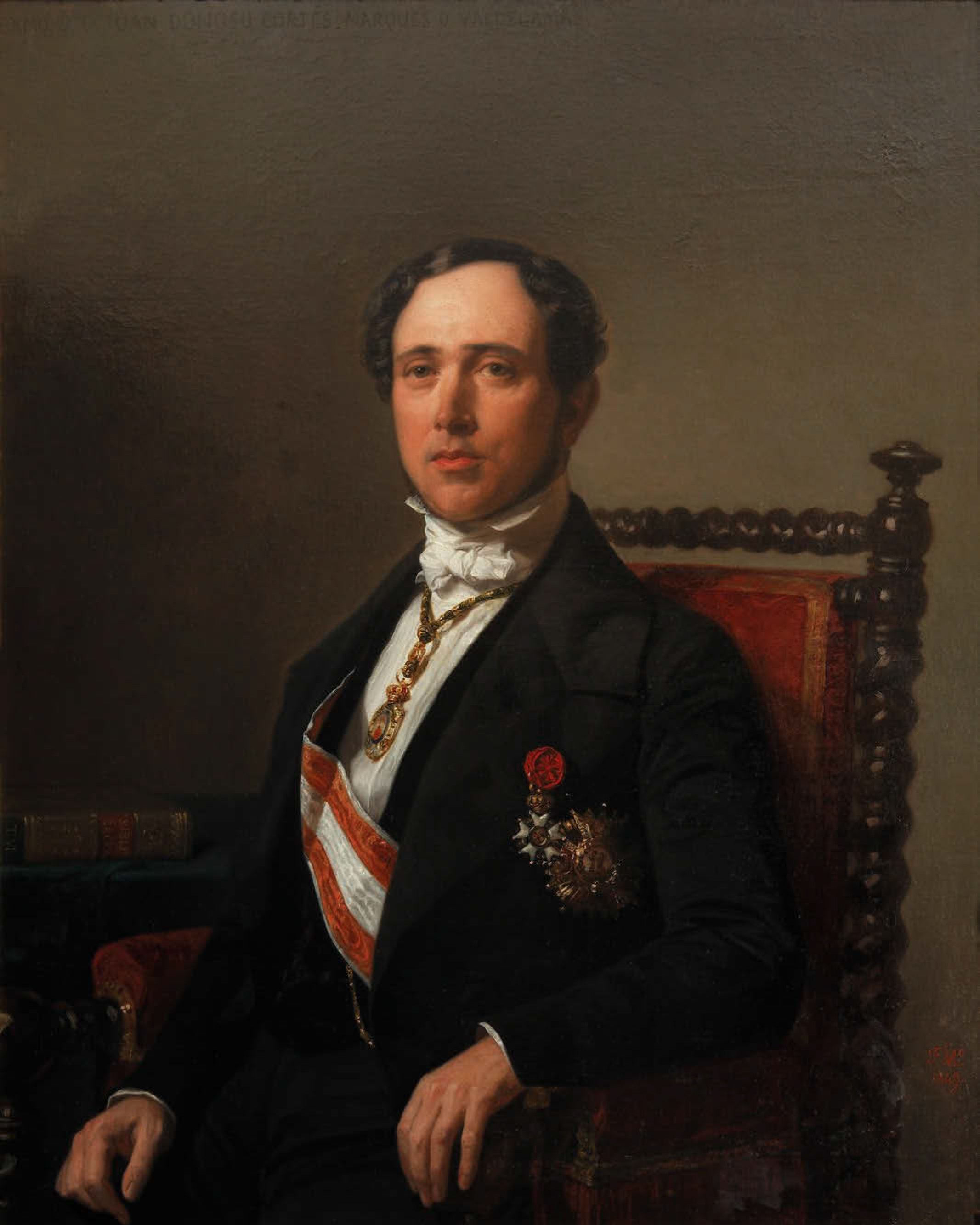
Juan Donoso Cortés

Juan Donoso Cortés (1809-1853) belonged to the first romantic generation in Spain. He became a prominent liberal conservative politician in the 1830s and 1840s and was Spanish ambassador to Paris and Berlin. Partially as a consequence of the revolutions of 1848, he abjured his liberalism in the Spanish Cortes on January 4, 1849, in a famous speech which was widely distributed and elicited responses from many. Alexander Herzen made one such response in Pierre-Joseph Proudhon's publication Voix du Peuple, and this answer caused the denunciation of the newspaper and its closing. Donoso's most famous book, Ensayo sobre el catolicismo, el liberalismo, y el socialismo, was published in Spanish and French in 1851; it became a bestseller and had as apocalyptic a success as Oswald Spengler's The Decline of the West had later. His reputation was spread by Montalembert, and he influenced Schelling, Ranke, Metternich, Bismarck, and Frederick William IV of Prussia. Donoso was condemned by his enemies as a reactionary, but in the 20th century he has been reevaluated in Spain, Germany, and France as an accurate observer whose prophecies came true in many cases, in particular his awareness of socialism and of the future political role of Russia. According to Karl Löwith, Donoso

describes bourgeois society exactly in the same terms as Kierkegaard and Marx: as an undifferentiated class discutidora, without truth, passion, or heroism. It eliminates hereditary nobility, but does nothing to combat the aristocracy of wealth; it accepts the sovereignty neither of the king nor of the people. Hatred of the aristocracy drives it to the left, and fear of radical socialism to the right. The opposite of its wordy indecisiveness is the decisive atheistic socialism of Proudhon. In contrast to him Donoso Cortés represents the political theology of the counter-revolution, to which the French Revolution, which declared man and the people sovereign, appeared as a revolt against the created order.

Donoso saw the choice facing Europe after the 1848 revolutions as either the dictatorship of government or the dictatorship of revolution. He incorporates into his thought the dialectic of revolution and counterrevolution which from 1789 to 1848 offers several stages: the French Revolution and the counterrevolutionary reaction, the attempt at a liberal synthesis, and the rise of socialism as an extreme form of revolution. Donoso experienced the liberal attempt at synthesis and reacted against it and against upcoming socialism by returning to the response of the first counterrevolutionaries, especially that of Louis de Bonald and Joseph de Maistre, which he applied to a new phenomenon, that of the third stage of the dialectic, the rise of socialism in the 1840s.

== See also ==
- Lullism
- School of Salamanca
- Hispanidad

== Bibliography ==
- Díaz Díaz, Gonzalo (1980). "Izquierdo, Sebastián". Hombres y documentos de la filosofían española. Vol. IV. Consejo Superior de Investigaciones Cientificas. pp. 344–348. ISBN 9788400071981.
- Novotny, Daniel (2013). Ens Rationis from Suárez to Caramuel: A Study in Scholasticism of the Baroque Era. New York: Fordham University Press. ISBN 978-08-23-24476-8.
- Jörg Tellkamp, ed. (2020). A Companion to Early Modern Spanish Imperial Political and Social Thought. Leiden: Brill. ISBN 978-90-04-42188-2.
- Harald Ernst Braun; Erik De Bom; Paolo Astorri, eds. (2021). A Companion to the Spanish Scholastics. Leiden: Brill. ISBN 978-90-04-29696-1.
