= Sebastián Izquierdo =

Spanish Jesuit philosopher

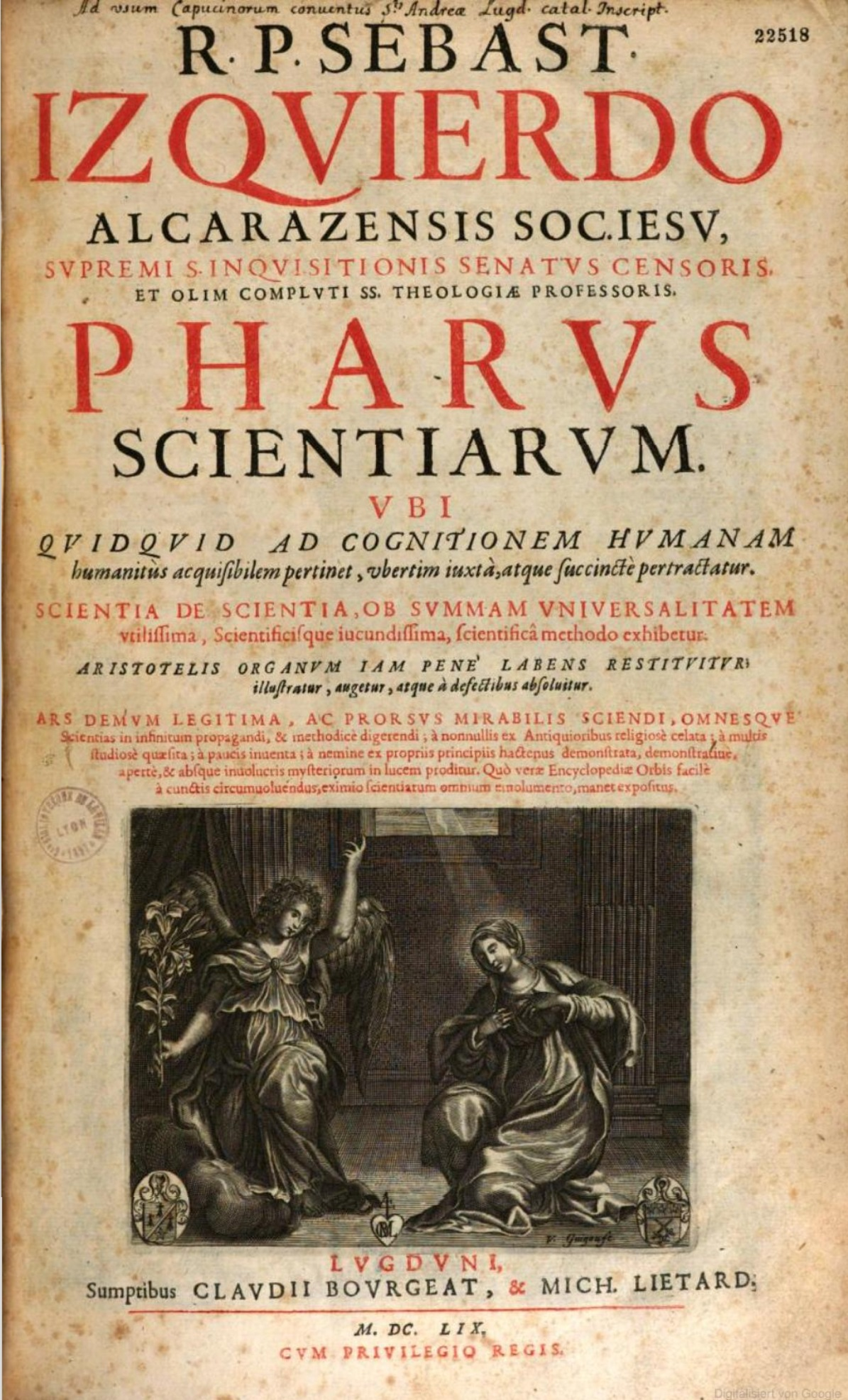
- Pharus scientiarum. Vol. 1. Lyon: Bourgeat and Liétard. 1659
- Born: January 29, 1601; Alcaraz, Kingdom of Spain
- Died: February 20, 1681 (aged 80); Rome, Papal States
- Occupations: Jesuit priest; Philosopher; Theologian
- Parent(s): Juan Izquierdo and María Izquierdo (née Monza)

Education
- Education: Colegio Imperial de Madrid

Philosophical work
- Era: 17th-century philosophy
- Region: Western philosophy; Spanish philosophy
- School: Christian philosophy; Aristotelianism; Baroque
- Main interests: Metaphysics, philosophy of science, combinatorics
- Notable works: Pharus scientiarum

Ecclesiastical career
- Religion: Christianity
- Church: Catholic Church
- Ordained: 17 November 1623

Sebastián Izquierdo SJ (29 January 1601 – 20 February 1681) was a Spanish philosopher and Jesuit, considered a pioneer in the fields of combinatorics and mathematical logic.

== Biography ==
Sebastián Izquierdo was born on 29 January 1601 at Alcaraz, in the Castilian province of Albacete. He joined the Jesuits on November 17, 1623 and studied at the Jesuit college in Alcalá de Henares and the prestigious Colegio Imperial de Madrid. He taught Philosophy and Theology at Alcalá, Murcia and Madrid and became Rector of the colleges of Murcia and Madrid. The environment at these colleges was brimming with renewed interest in the work of the Catalonian philosopher Ramon Llull emphasizing theoretical mathematics, combinatorics, and methodology of science. In 1659, he published in Lyon his monumental philosophical work Pharus scientiarum (The Lighthouse of Sciences), which was widely disseminated throughout Europe. Two years later, he left for Rome in order to attend the eleventh General Congregation of the Society of Jesus, at which time he was named assistant to the Superior General for Spain and the West Indies. In Rome he befriended among others the well-known German polymath Athanasius Kircher. In 1664 he published there the first part of his Opus Teologicum, and in 1670 the second part. He died in Rome on 20 February 1681.

== Philosophy ==
Although Izquierdo is virtually forgotten nowadays, he was an important figure 17th-century philosophy. Izquierdo was a follower of the Spanish medieval philosopher Ramon Llull. He was also strongly influenced by Bacon's empiricism. In his Pharus scientiarum he emphasized the need for a universal science that could be valid for all human knowledge (scientia de scientia or arte general del saber). It would be akin to the manner in which the Lullian Ars Magna was applicable to the entire ladder of creation. At the same time, Izquierdo advocated mathematizing the ars lulliana, and in the course of his exposition illustrates how Llull's letter combinations could be replaced by number combinations. According to Izquierdo only the mathematization of the Lullian ars combinandi could make it possible to create that unique instrument of all the sciences 'by means of which the edifice of science can be constructed and can grow infinitely'. The German Jesuit Athanasius Kircher, influenced by the Pharus scientiarum, wrote his immense Ars magna sciendi an attempt to make the Lullian Ars a "science of science" suitable for the preparation of an encyclopedia of all human knowledge.

Historians of mathematics remember Izquierdo especially in connection with combinatorics, to which he devoted Disputation 29 (De Combinatione). He was the first to discuss the number of k-combinations from a given set of n elements. Izquierdo influenced several contemporary philosophers, such as the Spanish Juan Caramuel and Tomás Vicente Tosca and the German Gaspar Knittel and Gottfried Wilhelm Leibniz; the latter, in particular, quoted the Disputatio de Combinatione, in his De Arte Combinatoria (1666). The Disputatio 29 «De Combinatione», was rescued from oblivion and studied in depth by the Jesuit historian of philosophy Ramón Ceñal, who not only translated it from Latin but also carried out an exhaustive study of it published by the Instituto de España.

== Works ==
A prolific author, Izquierdo wrote philosophical, theological and ascetic works.

- Theses de Immaculata Conceptione, Alcalá, 1658.
- Pharus scientiarum. Vol. 1. Lyon: Bourgeat and Liétard. 1659.
- Pharus scientiarum. Vol. 2. Lyon: Bourgeat and Liétard. 1659.
- Opus theologicum. Vol. 1. Rome: ex typographia Varesiana. 1664.
- Opus theologicum. Vol. 2. Rome: ex typographia Varesiana. 1670.
- Practica de los Exercicios Espirituales de Nuestro Padre San Ignacio. En Roma 1665, 1675.
- Consideraciones de los cuatro Novísimos del Hombre: Muerte, Juicio, Infierno y Gloria, Rome, 1672.
- Medios necessarios para la Salvación. Rome, 1674.

== Bibliography ==
On the life and ideas of Izquierdo, see:

- Sommervogel, Carlos (1890). Bibliothèque de la Compagnie de Jesús. Vol. IV. Bruxelles: O. Schepens. pp. 699–704.
- Burrieza Sánchez, Javier. "Sebastián Izquierdo". Diccionario biográfico español. Real Academia de la Historia.
- Carreras i Artau, Joaquim (1939). Historia de la filosofía española: filosofía cristiana de los siglos XIII al XV. Vol. II. Madrid: Real academia de ciencias exactas, físicas y naturales. pp. 305–309.
- Rossi, Paolo (1960). Clavis Universalis. Arti Mnemoniche e Logica combinatoria da Lullo a Leibniz. Milan and Naples: Ricciardi e Associati.
- Díaz Díaz, Gonzalo (1980). "Izquierdo, Sebastián". Hombres y documentos de la filosofían española. Vol. IV. Consejo Superior de Investigaciones Cientificas. pp. 344–348. ISBN 9788400071981.
- Fuertes Herreros, José Luis (1981). La lógica como fundamentación del arte general del saber en Sebastián Izquierdo. Estudio del "Pharus scientiarum" (1659). Salamanca: Universidad de Salamanca, Instituto de Estudios Albacetenses. ISBN 84-7481-185-6.
- Vasoli, Cesare (1988). "I gesuiti e l'enciclopedismo seicentesco". Les jésuites parmi les hommes aux XVIe et XVIIle siècles. Clermont-Ferrand: 491–507.
- Di Vona, Piero (1994). I concetti trascendenti in Sebastián Izquierdo e nella Scolastica del Seicento. Naples: Loffredo.
- Ortiz de Landázuri, Carlos (2013). "La lógica barroca de Sebastián Izquierdo. A propósito de la doble cuantificación de la proposición". El Barroco Iberoamericano y la Modernidad: Actas del VI Simposio Internacional del Instituto de Pensamiento Iberoamericano. Salamanca, 12-14 de Septiembre de 2012: 189–195. ISBN 978-84-7299-983-1.
- Novotný, Daniel D. (2017). "Sebastián Izquierdo on Universals: A Way Beyond Realism and Nominalism?". American Catholic Philosophical Quarterly. 91 (2): 227–249. doi:10.5840/acpq2017313114. S2CID 171458990.
- Embry, Brian (2013). "Sebastián Izquierdo's (1601–1681) Theory of Priority" (PDF). Journal of the American Philosophical Association. 4 (4): 491–509. doi:10.1017/apa.2018.37. S2CID 171676402.
- Lázaro, Manuel (2017). "Iluminar las ciencias desde el arte general del saber: la nueva enciclopedia barroca de Sebastián Izquierdo". Quaestio. 17: 545–569. doi:10.1484/J.QUAESTIO.5.115305.

For an extended study of Izquierdo's combinatory analysis and its influence, see:

- Ceñal, Ramón (1942). "El Padre Sebastián Izquierdo y su Pharus Scientiarum". Revista de Filosofía. 1: 127–154.
- Adán Oliver, Miguel (2015). "Sebastián Izquierdo, Matemático Barroco" (PDF). El Quijote Dilatado. Ciudad Real: Ediciones Sta.Mª de Alarcos: 11–36.
