= Pedro Hurtado de Mendoza =

Spanish philosopher and theologian (1578–1641)

The Reverend Pedro Hurtado de Mendoza
- Born: 1578; Balmaseda, Spanish Empire
- Died: 10 November 1641 (aged 62–63); Madrid, Spanish Empire

Education
- Education: University of Salamanca

Philosophical work
- Era: 17th-century philosophy
- Region: Western philosophy; Spanish philosophy
- School: Scholasticism; Conceptualism
- Institutions: University of Valladolid; University of Salamanca
- Notable students: Rodrigo de Arriaga
- Main interests: Metaphysics, logic

Pedro Hurtado de Mendoza SJ (1578 – November 10, 1641), also called Puente Hurtado de Mendoza, was a Basque scholastic philosopher, Jesuit priest, and theologian.

== Philosophical work ==
Pedro Hurtado de Mendoza entered the Jesuit order in 1595 in Salamanca. He was a teacher of theology and philosophy in Valladolid and he occupied a chair at the University of Salamanca.

Hurtado belonged to the third generation of Jesuit scholars and initiated the shift from more realist positions of Francisco Suárez and Gabriel Vásquez towards conceptualism, characteristic of that generation. His conceptualist tendencies were further developed by his pupils Rodrigo de Arriaga and Francisco Oviedo. His variously titled volume on scholastic philosophy (last Universa Philosophia) is the earliest example of the genre of Baroque cursus typical of 17th- and 18th-century scholastic philosophy and theology.

== Works ==
- Disputationes a Summulis ad Metaphysicam (Valladolid 1615) reprinted as: Disputationes ad universam philosophiam (Lyon 1617) and as: Universa philosophia (Lyon 1624).
- Disputationes scholasticae et morales de tribus virtutibus theologicis. De fide volumen secundum, Salamanca, 1631.
- Disputationes scholasticae et morales de spe et charitate, volumen secundum, Salamanca, 1631.
- Disputationes de Deo homine, sive de Incarnatione Filii Dei, Antwerp, 1634.

== See also ==
- Thomism
- School of Salamanca
- Second scholasticism
- Nominalism
- Society of Jesus
- Rodrigo de Arriaga
