= Thomas Compton Carleton =

English Jesuit and scholastic philosopher (1619–1687)

The Reverend Thomas Compton Carleton
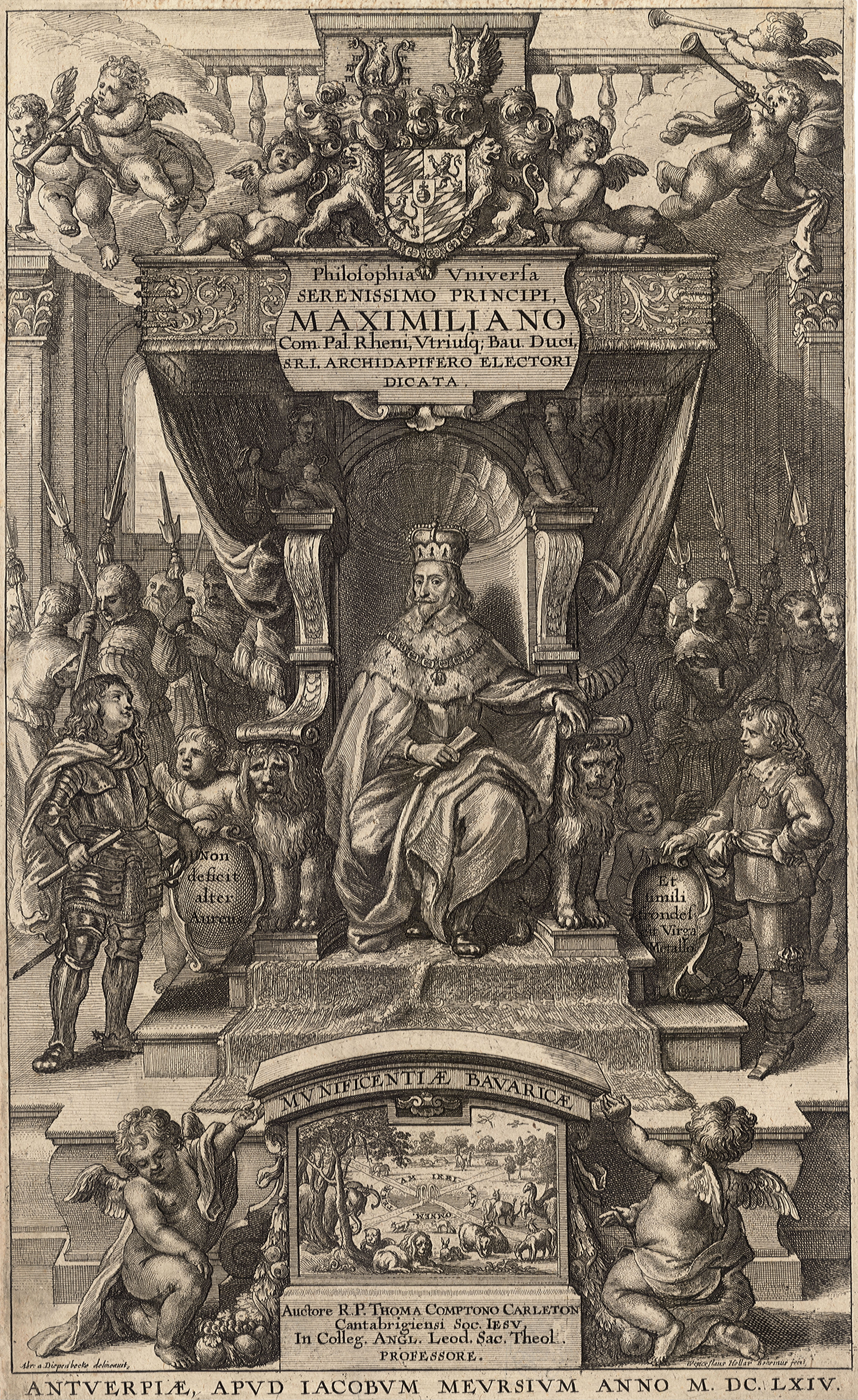
- Title-page of Thomas Compton Carleton's Philosophia universa (Antwerp, 1649)
- Born: c. 1592; Cambridgeshire, Kingdom of England
- Died: March 24, 1666; Liège, Southern Netherlands

Philosophical work
- Era: 17th-century philosophy
- Region: Western philosophy; British philosophy
- School: Scholasticism
- Institutions: Colleges of St Omer, Bruges and Liège
- Main interests: Metaphysics, philosophy of language, natural philosophy

Thomas Compton Carleton (c. 1592 – 24 March 1666) was an English Jesuit and scholastic philosopher, chiefly remembered for his contributions to natural philosophy and the philosophy of language.

== Biography ==
Thomas Compton was born around 1592 in Cambridgeshire, the son of Richard Compton and Anne Fludd. The Comptons were a well-to-do Catholic family and the name Compton (or Compton Carleton) figures prominently in lists of early seventeenth-century Jesuits. Like two of his brothers Thomas Compton was sent to the continent to receive a Catholic education; he stayed at the Jesuit College at St-Omer in the Southern Netherlands from 1606 until 1611. Together with his brother Henry he subsequently moved to the English College at Madrid. In June 1614 all the English students were transferred to Valladolid in order to continue their studies at the College of St Alban. After three years at Valladolid, where he was a fellow student with the famous Spanish philosopher, Rodrigo de Arriaga, Thomas Compton was ordained priest.

He entered the Society of Jesus in 1617, was ordained priest at Douai in 1622, went on the hazardous English Mission in 1625, and took the four vows of the Jesuit order on 21 May 1628. He was not destined for martyrdom: his superiors thought his talents best suited for promoting the education of the English Catholics in the Low Countries. For a while he taught rhetoric and belles-lettres at the English College of St Omer, near Calais. Then for most of his adult life he taught philosophy, theology and Holy Scripture at the Jesuit College in Liège, where he was also for a long time prefect of studies. He died in Liège on 24 March 1666, aged seventy-five.

== Works ==
Compton was universally admired for his classic taste and his skill in philosophical and theological science. In his entry on Compton, Southwell praises him for his great gifts as a teacher. These gifts are discernible in the handbooks on philosophy and theology that he published. Philosophia universa (Antwerp, 1649) is a well-organized treatment of the main branches of philosophy; Prometheus Christianus (Antwerp, 1652), a commentary on Aristotle's Nicomachean Ethics, surveys the field of moral philosophy on the basis of nineteen 'disputationes'; and Cursus Theologici (Liège, 1659–64) is a monumental two-volume theological handbook of more than 1000 pages. The many subsequent editions of his works testify to his reputation. Two of Compton's Aristotelian commentaries (on De Generatione et Corruptione and on the Organon) were published posthumously at Salamanca.

Compton Carleton was a fierce critic of cartesian philosophy. He criticized Descartes's views of substantial and accidental forms, the Eucharist, creation, ‘rarefaction’, and matter.

== List of works ==
- Philosophia universa (Antwerp, 1649).
- Prometheus Christianus, seu liber moralium in quo philosophiae finis aperitur (Antwerp, 1652).
- Cursus theologici tomus prior (Liège, 1658); and tomus posterior (Liège, 1664).
- Disputationes physicae, ubi etiam de generatione et corruptione (Salamanca, 1676).
- Disputationes in universam Aristotelis logicam (Salamanca, 1716).

== Bibliography ==
- Cooper, Thompson (1887). "Compton, Thomas" . In Stephen, Leslie (ed.). Dictionary of National Biography. Vol. 11. London: Smith, Elder & Co.
- McCormick, John F. (1937). "A Jesuit Contemporary of Descartes". The Modern Schoolman. 14 (4): 79–82. doi:10.5840/schoolman193714429.
- Doyle, John P. (1988). "Thomas Compton Carleton S.J.: On Words Signifying More than their Speakers or Makers Know or Intend". The Modern Schoolman. 66 (1): 1–28. doi:10.5840/schoolman19886611.
- Blom, J.; Blom, F. "Compton [Compton Carleton], Thomas". Oxford Dictionary of National Biography (online ed.). Oxford University Press. doi:10.1093/ref:odnb/6038. (Subscription or UK public library membership required.)
- Salas, V.M. (2015). "Compton, Thomas". In Sgarbi, M. (ed.). Encyclopedia of Renaissance Philosophy. Cham: Springer. pp. 1–2. doi:10.1007/978-3-319-02848-4_475-1. ISBN 978-3-319-02848-4.
- Embry, Brian (2015). "An Early Modern Scholastic Theory of Negative Entities: Thomas Compton Carleton on Lacks, Negations, and Privations". British Journal for the History of Philosophy. 23 (1): 22–45. doi:10.1080/09608788.2014.976759. S2CID 144329476.
