= Protestant orthodoxy =

Protestant orthodoxy may refer to:

- Lutheran orthodoxy
- Reformed orthodoxy
- Neo-orthodoxy

== See also ==
- Protestant scholasticism
