= Rodrigo de Arriaga =

Spanish Jesuit philosopher and theologian (1592–1667)

The Reverend Rodrigo de Arriaga
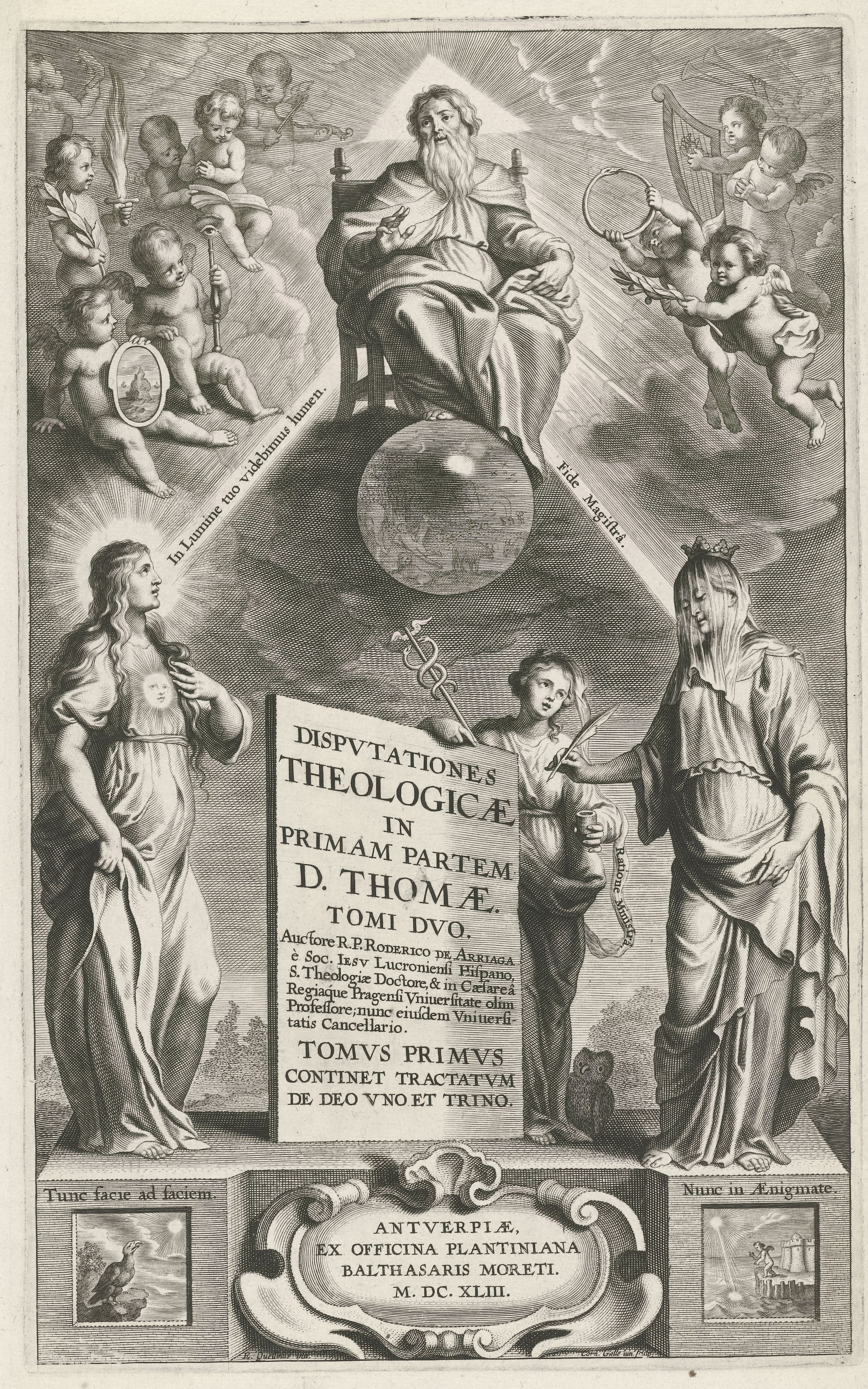
- Disputationes theologicae, Antwerp, 1643
- Born: 17 January 1592; Logroño, Spanish Empire
- Died: 7 June 1667 (aged 75); Prague, Kingdom of Bohemia
- Parent(s): Pedro de Arriaga and Graciosa Mendo

Education
- Education: Charles University (STD, 1626)
- Academic advisor: Pedro Hurtado de Mendoza

Philosophical work
- Era: 17th-century philosophy
- Region: Western philosophy; Spanish philosophy
- School: Scholasticism; Conceptualism
- Institutions: University of Valladolid; University of Salamanca; Charles University
- Main interests: Metaphysics, logic, natural philosophy

Rodrigo de Arriaga SJ (Spanish: [roˈðɾiɣo ðe aˈrjaɣa]; 17 January 1592 – 7 June 1667) was a Spanish philosopher, Jesuit priest, and theologian. He is known as one of the foremost Spanish Jesuits of his day and as a leading representative of post-Suárezian baroque Jesuit nominalism. According to Richard Popkin, Arriaga was "the last of the great Spanish Scholastics".

== Life ==
Born in 1592, at Logroño in Castile, he joined the Society of Jesus on 17 September 1606, when he was 14 years old. He studied philosophy and theology under Pedro Hurtado de Mendoza and taught philosophy (1620–1623) and theology (1624) in Valladolid and theology in Salamanca (1624–1625). On 12 November 1623, he took the fourth vow in the Society of Jesus.

In 1625 he was sent to the University of Prague, where he remained for the rest of his life. Arriaga was solemnly declared a doctor of theology in Prague in January 1626, and shortly thereafter began teaching. Arriaga was instrumental in establishing Jesuit control over the Bohemian educational system. He served as professor of theology until 1637, when he became prefect of studies in the theology faculty. He held that position until 1642, when he became chancellor of the Clementinum, remaining in this post until 1654. In 1654 he was again appointed prefect of studies and retained this position until his death. Arriaga gained a wide reputation, not only in Spain, but all over Europe. So great was his intellectual authority and his fame as a teacher that he was the subject of a popular quip: "Pragam videre, Arriagam audire"—"To see Prague, to hear Arriaga." The Jesuit province of Bohemia three times made him a deputy to Rome to attend the General Congregation of the Jesuit Order. He was highly esteemed by Urban VIII, Innocent X, and the Emperor Ferdinand III. He died in Prague on June 17, 1667.

Arriaga was a good friend and colleague of the Belgian mathematician Grégoire de Saint-Vincent. When, after the Battle of Breitenfeld, the Saxons pillaged Prague and set fire to many parts of the city, it was Arriaga who saved Saint-Vincent's manuscripts from destruction.

Arriaga occupies an important place in the history of modern philosophy. Among the attempts made in the course of the seventeenth century to revive and reinvigorate medieval scholasticism, the Cursus Philosophicus of Arriaga, scholastic alike in contents, in arrangement, and in form, is one of the most skilful. Arriaga had studied with attention the recent writings of the anti-Aristotelians; and, giving effect to many of the opinions advanced by them, he endeavoured by modifications and concessions to adapt to modern use the logic and metaphysics, but still more the physical hypotheses, of his scholastic masters. In this attempt at compromise he went further than any other scholastic philosopher of the seventeenth century. In his own day, as a Jesuit teaching the doctrines then approved by his order, he was indeed safe from any serious charge of heterodoxy; but his position as an innovator laid him open to many attacks from the uncompromising adherents of the Aristotelian school. He was openly denounced as a sceptic, and accused of wilfully suppressing or weakening the answers to plausible objections against the system which he professed to teach. Opposers of Aristotelianism, on the other hand, like the Platonist philosopher Jan Marek Marci, seized upon Arriaga's concessions as proving the unsoundness of the foundations upon which the Aristotelian philosophy rests.

== Philosophy ==
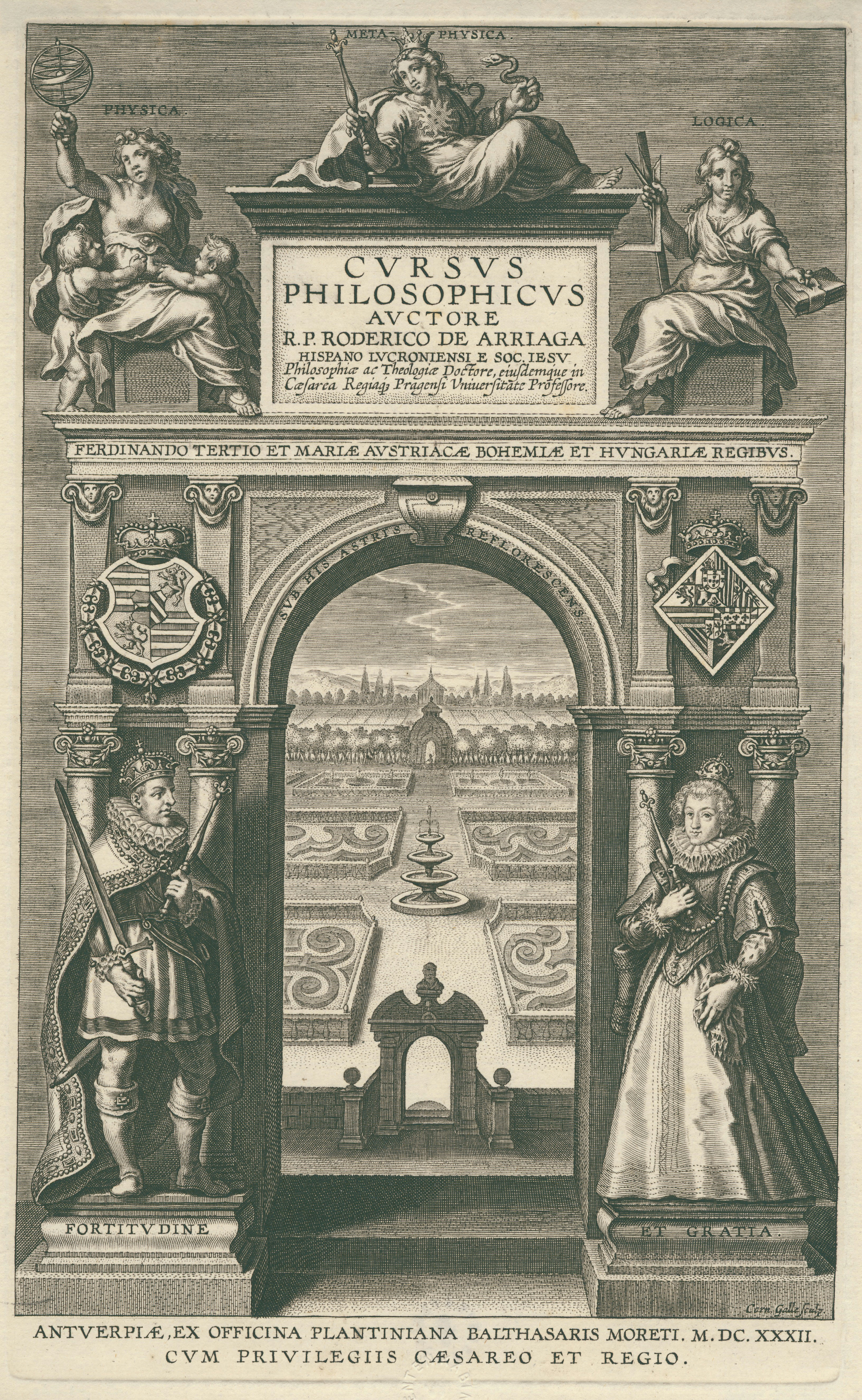
Title-page to Rodrigo de Arriaga's Cursus Philosophicus (Antwerp: Balthasar Moretus) 1632

Very innovative in metaphysics and natural philosophy (he defended heliocentrism despite the ecclesiastical prohibitions), Arriaga approached scholastic scholarship in a critical manner and with sympathy for nominalist philosophy. He rejected the ontological argument, denying the possibility of demonstrating a priori the existence of God. He maintained that immortality can be proven as only probable, namely from the soul's inclination towards perpetuity.

Arriaga wrote favorably of the nominalist view of quantity and substance in his Cursus Philosophicus. He claimed that “ex Philosophia” there was no reason to postulate quantity distinct from prime matter and that this opinion had sufficient supporters both ancient and modern who provided very strong arguments. The function of quantity was to render a thing impenetrable. Arriaga admitted that it was impossible to determine whether something was impenetrable by having something added to it or by its essence, but then he drew the typically Ockhamist conclusion that when we do not have positive arguments for proving a plurality of entities (i.e., quantity being something additional to the thing itself), we must deny that they exist. Arriaga conceded that his opinion was not certain because of the argument derived from the Eucharist that quantity was distinct from prime matter, but, in contrast to Suárez, he maintained that the latter argument was not convincing and was merely probable.

Arriaga displays an original approach to natural philosophy, interest in the critical scientific spirit of the time, and familiarity with the new experimental science, quite unusual among the scholastics. He gave up most of the opinions of Scholastic authorities in point of natural philosophy, such as the composition of the continuum, rarefaction, etc. and held many innovative views. Regarding the structure of the universe, he accepted the fluid nature of planetary space, though he rejected the arguments from astronomical observations. He argued that arguments supporting the incorruptibility of the celestial bodies were at best specious. While the Revisers General attempted to enforce uniformity within the Society, Arriaga called for greater liberty in philosophy. In the preface of the first edition of his Cursus Philosophicus (1632) he argued explicitly in favour of new opinions. Was there not just as much genius in Thomas, Cajetan, Molina, and Suàrez as in the ancients? Since we have studied much since the ancients, he wondered, "why then is it not proper for us to deduce new conclusions?" Antiquity was no guarantee of the truth of any opinion, for in his view it was truly amazing how many ancient opinions had virtually no foundation but were based simply on the badly understood authority of Aristotle or some other philosopher.

== Legacy ==
In his Dictionnaire Historique et Critique, Pierre Bayle praises Arriaga for his sceptical method and ability to destroy rival theories, considered by Bayle as essential to philosophy. Arriaga exerted a strong influence on the Czech medical doctor Jan Marek Marci, on the Italian scholar Valeriano Magni and on the Spanish philosopher and scientist Juan Caramuel y Lobkowitz. The German philosopher Gottfried Wilhelm Leibniz used his works extensively. It can also be assumed that Descartes's treatment of the problems of rarefaction and condensation (Principia II, 5–6) is influenced by Arriaga. According to Sven Knebel, Arriaga was “the contemporary Catholic Scholastic whom the seventeenth-century Protestants studied most.”

His work was, however, sometimes controversial. Jean Baptiste Ladvocat regarded him as one of the most abstruse and difficult scholastic philosophers. Arriaga was accused by his superiors of supporting the Zenonist doctrine of quantity. This doctrine, which asserted that quantity consisted of points, had been repeatedly and strenuously rejected by the revisers general as incompatible with the orthodox account of Eucharist. However, the routine reissuing of such injunctions and the unflagging efforts of the censors to expunge such a doctrine from Jesuit books attest to the continued dissemination of zenonism within the Order. In a letter from General Vincenzo Carafa, Arriaga was named as the source of the diffusion of this doctrine in Germany. The text in question was doubtless his philosophy textbook, Cursus Philosophicus, which enjoyed wide circulation throughout the German Province of the Society of Jesus.

== Interpretation of laws ==
Rodrigo de Arriaga is renowned for his significant contributions to moral theology and philosophy in the 17th century. His work Tratado sobre las leyes (1647) stands out for addressing the interpretation of laws within the context of the Catholic Iberian legal culture of the Early Modern period.

Arriaga proposed that the interpretation of laws should consider not only the legal text but also the specific circumstances of each case, the legislator’s intent, and the principles of justice. This casuistic approach allowed for a more flexible and adapted application of legal norms, reflecting the complexity of human situations.

As part of the probabilist tradition, Arriaga argued that, in the face of moral or legal doubts, one could follow a probable opinion, even if less certain, as long as it was based on solid arguments. This perspective influenced the legal practices of the time, allowing greater flexibility in the application of laws and recognizing the plurality of possible interpretations.

Arriaga’s work reflects the intersection between theology and law during the period, demonstrating how the interpretation of laws was intrinsically linked to the notion of justice and judicial discretion. His contributions offer a deeper understanding of the Catholic Iberian legal culture of the 17th century, characterized by legal pluralism and an emphasis on particular circumstances in the pursuit of justice

== Works ==
Arriaga published two massive works:

- Cursus philosophicus. Antwerp: Plantin Press. 1632. Arriaga's Cursus Philosophicus is a university textbook containing material covering the usual three-year Jesuit philosophical curriculum, i.e. Summulae, Logica, Physica, De coelo, De generatione, De anima, and Metaphysica (ethics was taught within moral theology). The Cursus was highly successful, and was reprinted several times: Paris, 1637, 1639; Lyon, 1644, 1647, 1653, 1659, 1669;
- Disputationes Theologicae in Summam Divi Thomae. This ponderous series of dissertations on Thomas Aquinas was published in successive volumes as follows: vols. I and II Disputationes in Primam Partem, Antwerp, 1643; Lyon, 1644, 1669; vols. III and IV Disputationes in Primam Secundae, Antwerp, 1644; Lyon, 1669; vol. V Disputationes in Secundam Secundae, Antwerp, 1649; Lyon 1651; vols. VI, VII and VIII Disputationes in Tertiam Partem, Antwerp, 1650–55; Lyon, 1654–1669.
