= Casuistry =

Reasoning by extrapolation

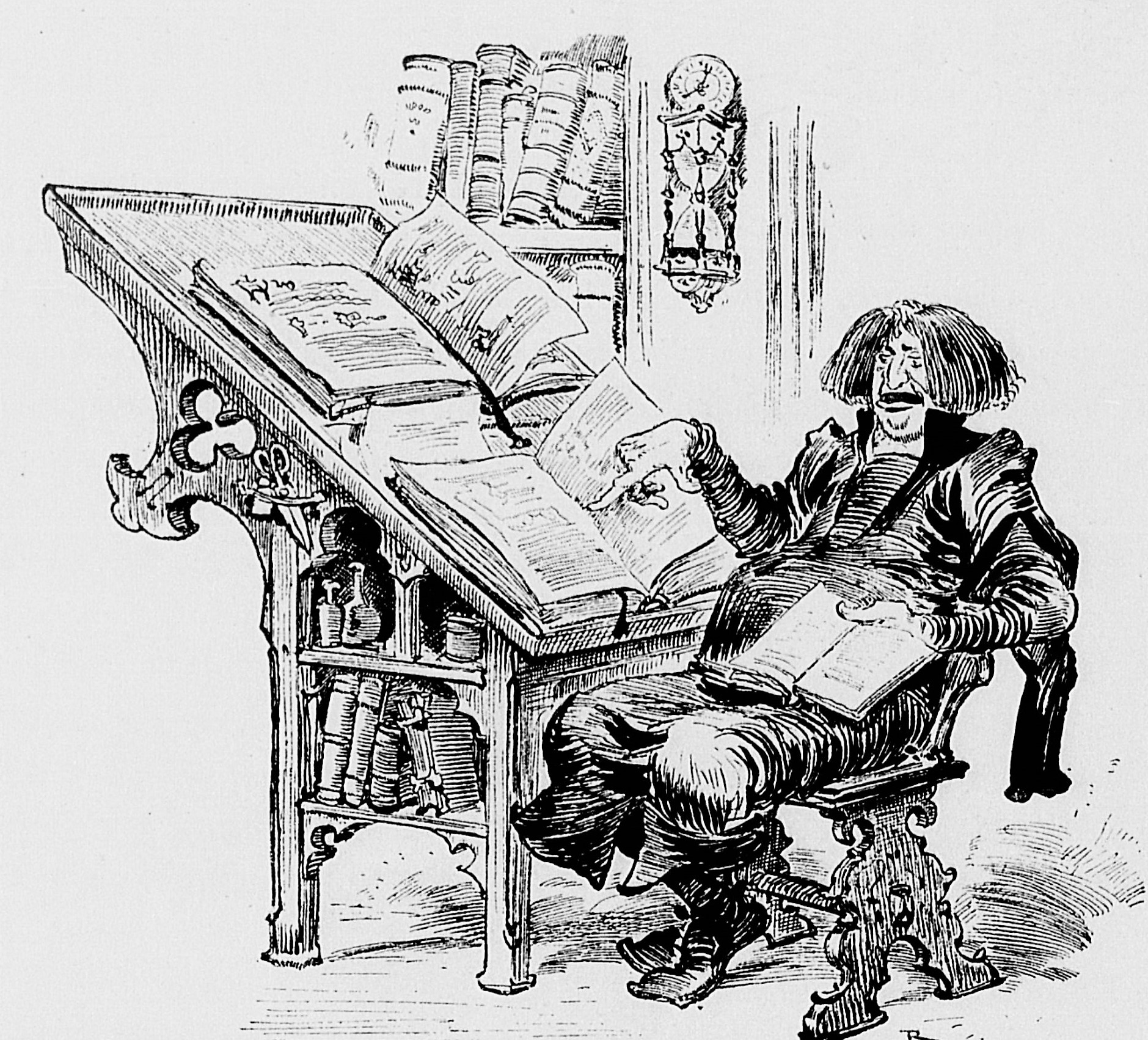
Le grand docteur sophiste, 1886 illustration of Gargantua by Albert Robida, expressing mockery of his casuist education

Casuistry (/ˈkæzjuɪstri/ KAZ-ew-iss-tree) is a process of reasoning for resolving an ethical dilemma (moral problem) either by extracting or by extending abstract rules from a particular case of conscience, and reapplying those abstract rules to other, different ethical dilemmas. Casuistry is a method of reasoning common to applied ethics and jurisprudence. Moreover, in philosophy, the term casuistry is a pejorative criticism of the use of clever but unsound reasoning, especially in ethical questions, as in the case of sophistry. As a method of reasoning, casuistry is both the:

Study of cases of conscience and a method of solving conflicts of obligations by applying general principles of ethics, religion, and moral theology to particular and concrete cases of human conduct. This frequently demands an extensive knowledge of natural law and equity, civil law, ecclesiastical precepts, and an exceptional skill in interpreting these various norms of conduct ...

== Etymology ==
The term casuistry and the noun "casuist" date from 1600 and derive from the Latin noun casus, case, as used in the phrase a "case of conscience", and the usual sense of the usage was pejorative.

== History ==
Casuistry dates from Aristotle (384–322 BC), and the peak of casuistry was from 1550 to 1650, when the Society of Jesus (the Jesuits) used casuistic reasoning, particularly in administering the Sacrament of Penance (or "confession"). The term became pejorative following Blaise Pascal's attack on the misuse of the method in his Provincial Letters (1656–57). The French mathematician, religious philosopher and Jansenist sympathiser attacked priests who used casuistic reasoning in confession to pacify wealthy church donors. Pascal charged that "remorseful" aristocrats could confess a sin one day, re-commit it the next, then generously donate to the church and return to re-confess their sin, confident that they were being assigned a penance in name only. These criticisms darkened casuistry's reputation in the following centuries. For example, the Oxford English Dictionary quotes a 1738 essay by Henry St. John, 1st Viscount Bolingbroke, to the effect that casuistry "destroys, by distinctions and exceptions, all morality, and effaces the essential difference between right and wrong, good and evil".

The 20th century saw a revival of interest in casuistry. In their book The Abuse of Casuistry: A History of Moral Reasoning (1988), Albert Jonsen and Stephen Toulmin argue that it is not casuistry but its abuse that has been a problem; that, properly used, casuistry is powerful reasoning. Jonsen and Toulmin offer casuistry as a method for compromising the contradictory principles of moral absolutism and moral relativism. In addition, the ethical philosophies of utilitarianism (especially preference utilitarianism) and pragmatism have been identified as employing casuistic reasoning.

=== Early modernity ===
The casuistic method was popular among Catholic thinkers in the early modern period. Casuistic authors include Antonio Escobar y Mendoza, whose Summula casuum conscientiae (1627) enjoyed great success, Thomas Sanchez, Vincenzo Filliucci (Jesuit and penitentiary at St Peter's), Antonino Diana, Paul Laymann (Theologia Moralis, 1625), John Azor (Institutiones Morales, 1600), Etienne Bauny, Louis Cellot, Valerius Reginaldus, and Hermann Busembaum (d. 1668).

Mid-17th century disputes over the doctrine of probabilism interrupted the development of casuistry; this doctrine allowed following a "probable opinion" backed by any theologian, even if it conflicted with a more probable view or a passage from the Fathers of the Church.

Certain kinds of casuistry were criticised by early Protestant theologians, because it was used to justify many of the abuses that they sought to reform. Catholic and Jansenist philosopher Blaise Pascal famously assailed it in his Provincial Letters amid the formulary controversy with the Jesuits, condemning the use of rhetorics to defend moral laxity. The public equated this with Jesuitism, giving the term its everyday sense of intricate sophistic reasoning that excuses such laxity. By the mid-18th century, "casuistry" had become a synonym for attractive-sounding, but ultimately false, moral reasoning.

In 1679 Pope Innocent XI publicly condemned sixty-five of the more radical propositions (stricti mentalis), taken chiefly from the writings of Escobar, Suarez and other casuists as propositiones laxorum moralistarum and forbade anyone to teach them under penalty of excommunication. Despite this condemnation by a pope, both Catholicism and Protestantism permit the use of ambiguous statements in specific circumstances.

=== Later modernity ===
G. E. Moore dealt with casuistry in chapter 1.4 of his Principia Ethica, in which he claimed that "the defects of casuistry are not defects of principle; no objection can be taken to its aim and object. It has failed only because it is far too difficult a subject to be treated adequately in our present state of knowledge". Furthermore, he asserted that "casuistry is the goal of ethical investigation. It cannot be safely attempted at the beginning of our studies, but only at the end".

Since the 1960s, applied ethics has revived the ideas of casuistry in applying moral reasoning to particular cases in law, bioethics, and business ethics. Its facility for dealing with situations where rules or values conflict with each other has made it a useful approach in professional ethics, and casuistry's reputation has improved somewhat as a result.

Pope Francis, a Jesuit, criticized casuistry as "the practice of setting general laws on the basis of exceptional cases" in instances where a more holistic approach would be preferred.

== See also ==
- Applied ethics – Practical application of moral considerations
- Case-based reasoning – Process of solving new problems based on the solutions of similar past problems
- Consequentialism – Ethical theory based on consequences
- Dispensation (Catholic canon law) – Exemption from the obligation of law in some cases
- First principle – Basic proposition or assumption
- List of thought processes – Overview of and topical guide to thought
- Pilpul – Method of studying the Talmud through intense textual analysis
- Qiyas – Deductive analogy or reasoning by measuring the new situation with the given situation
- Rhetoric – Art of persuasion
- Rhetorical reason – Faculty of discovering the crux of the matter
- School of Salamanca – Spanish Scholastic intellectual movement
- Situational ethics – Concept in ethics
- Talmudical hermeneutics – Methods of studying the Hebrew Bible in Rabbinic Judaism
- Heuristics – Problem-solving method
