= Lettres provinciales =

Letters by Blaise Pascal published 1656–57

Lettres provinciales

The Lettres provinciales (Provincial Letters) are a series of eighteen polemical letters written by the French philosopher and theologian Blaise Pascal under the pseudonym Louis de Montalte. Written in the midst of the formulary controversy between the Jansenists and the Jesuits, they are a defense of the Jansenist Antoine Arnauld from Port-Royal-des-Champs, a friend of Pascal who in 1656 was condemned by the Faculté de Théologie at the Sorbonne in Paris for views that were claimed to be heretical. The first letter is dated January 23, 1656 and the eighteenth March 24, 1657. A fragmentary nineteenth letter is frequently included with the other eighteen.

In these letters, Pascal humorously attacked casuistry, a rhetorical method often used by Jesuit theologians, and accused Jesuits of moral laxity. Being quickly forced underground while writing the Provincial Letters, Pascal pretended they were reports from a Parisian to a friend in the provinces, on the moral and theological issues then exciting the intellectual and religious circles in the capital. In the letters, Pascal's tone combines the fervor of a convert with the wit and polish of a man of the world. Their style meant that, quite apart from their religious influence, the Provincial Letters were popular as a literary work. Adding to that popularity was Pascal's use of humor, mockery, and satire in his arguments. The letters also influenced the prose of later French writers like Voltaire and Jean-Jacques Rousseau. Brilliantly written by Pascal, the Provincial Letters would not have been possible without the work of theologians from Port-Royal; indeed, most of the arguments Pascal deployed were already to be found in Arnauld's Théologie morale des Jésuites, something which led the Jesuit Nicolas Caussin to reply to Pascal's perceived libel. Pascal's main source on Jesuit casuistry was Antonio Escobar's Summula casuum conscientiae (1627), several propositions of which would be later condemned by Pope Innocent XI.

Paradoxically, the Provincial Letters were both a success and a defeat: a defeat, on the political and theological level, and a success on the moral level. The final letter from Pascal, in 1657, had defied the Pope himself, provoking Alexander VII to condemn the letters. But that did not stop most of educated France from reading them. Moreover, even Pope Alexander, while publicly opposing them, nonetheless was persuaded by Pascal's arguments. Just a few years later (1665–66, and then 1679), Alexander condemned "laxity" in the church and ordered a revision of casuistic texts.

== Content of the letters ==
Structurally, the first three letters ridicule the dispute between the Thomists and the Jesuits on the nature of salvation, rather asserting a Jansenist understanding of salvation. Making allusion to the Congregatio de Auxiliis, the debate concerned the respective role of grace and free will, Molinists (i.e. Jesuits) claiming that an "efficacious grace" was not necessary to save man, but only a "sufficient grace" bestowed by God to all men, while Thomists claimed that the "sufficient grace", given to all men, had to be assisted by an "efficacious grace", bestowed only to the select few (in accordance also with Augustinism). Pascal thus highlighted, in the Second Letter, that neo-Thomists and Jesuits were using the same term, "sufficient grace", with two different senses, for political reasons.

=== Fourth Letter ===
The Fourth Letter deals with the question of "actual grace", the Jesuits claiming that sin could only be committed if people had knowledge of the evil inherent to the planned action. The Jesuit priest with whom Pascal was speaking quoted Le Moyne, a professor to the Sorbonne from 1642 to 1654. Le Moyne's definition had already been used by Arnauld in the Apologie pour les saints Pères:

1. On the one hand, God sheds abroad on the soul some measure of love, which gives it a bias toward the thing commanded; and on the other, a rebellious concupiscence solicits it in the opposite direction. 2. God inspires the soul with a knowledge of its own weakness. 3. God reveals the knowledge of the physician who can heal it. 4. God inspires it with a desire to be healed. 5. God inspires a desire to pray and solicit his assistance.

"And unless all these things occur and pass through the soul," added the Jesuit, "the action is not properly a sin, and cannot be imputed, as M. le Moine shows in the same place and in what follows."

Pascal replied, that this meant that all those whose "vices have got the better of their reason" and who indulge in "a perpetual round of all sorts of pleasures", so long as they are ignorant of the immorality of their actions, were excused by this doctrine. While he argued, citing the Bible, that those who did believe in God but were deprived of knowledge of their evil actions (and thus deprived, for a moment, of the Jesuits' "actual grace") were still sinners.

Furthermore, Pascal ridiculed the attempt of Etienne Bauny, author of a Somme des péchés qui se commettent en tous états (Paris, 1634), to use Aristotle to justify this doctrine of sin (which could, according to Bauny, only be effective if man possessed the knowledge of the action). Bauny thus quoted the Nicomachean Ethics, III, 1, alleging that a voluntary action needed knowledge of what was good or evil in it. Pascal replied, also quoting Aristotle (he seemingly was the only one to use this argument in this debate), that Aristotle spoke only of knowledge of the actual circumstances of the act, but not at all of the capacity to discriminate between good and evil – since Aristotle stated that one who was devoid of that capacity was not excused at all, but rather considered a vicious man.

=== Casuistry ===
The rest of the letters are mainly an attack on Jesuit casuistry. The Fifth Letter, published in a hurry after a police search in Jansenist-friendly publishing houses, is particularly dedicated to criticisms against the Jesuits' doctrine of moral probabilism, according to which one could adopt a "probable opinion", that is, an opinion made plausible by the authority of a theologian, even if it was less probable than another opinion – especially concerning what conduct ought to be followed, the nature of sins, etc. Pascal relied heavily on witty attack, composed of quotes from various books written by Jesuit casuists, in particular by Antonio Escobar y Mendoza's Summula casuum conscientiae (1627), which had enjoyed a great success, and also Thomas Sanchez, Vincenzo Filliucci (Jesuit and penitentiary at St Peter's), Antonino Diana, Paul Laymann, Etienne Bauny, Louis Cellot, Valerius Reginaldus, Bernard Lamy (censored on 8 October 1649 by the Faculty of Leuven for his defense of homicide), etc.

In the Fifth Letter, he evoked in passing the Chinese Rites controversy which ended with the Jesuits' condemnation and the Congregatio de Propaganda Fide's decision to prohibit idolatry under any pretexts. He also alluded to the problem of the relations between Christian virtues and natural virtues, debated in particular during the first half of the 17th century, after Jean-Pierre Camus and Arnauld, Pascal attacked the Jesuit Antoine Sirmond, who had practically admitted the identity between natural virtues and Christian virtues.

Starting at Letter VI, dated 10 April 1656, Pascal gives a number of examples of Jesuit casuistry and of its "relaxed morality", citing abundant sources (many of which came from Escobar). He illustrated casuistry by citing mostly Jesuitical texts allowing excuses to abstain from fasting (citing Vincenzo Filliucci's Moralium quaestionum de christianis officiis et casibus conscientiae... tomus, Lyon, 1622; often cited by Escobar); from giving to the poor (indirectly citing Gabriel Vasquez from Diana; for a monk temporarily defrocking himself to go to the brothel (citing an exact quote of Sanchez from Escobar, who was evading Pius IV's Contra sollicitantes and Pius V's Contra clericos papal bulls, the latter directed against sodomite clergy)); in the Seventh Letter, propositions allowing homicides (even to the clergy) and duels as long as the intention is not directed for revenge; others permitting corruption of judges as long as it is not intended as corruption; others allowing usury or Mohatra contracts; casuistic propositions allowing robbery and stealing from one's master; others allowing lying through the use of rhetorical "mental reservation" (restrictio mentalis; for instance: saying, loudly "I swear that...", silently "I said that...", and loudly again the object of the pledge) and equivocations. A number of these scandalous propositions were later condemned by Pope Innocent XI.

In the Ninth Letter, the Jesuit explains to the narrator easy ways to enter Heaven, citing a book called "Paradise opened to Philagio, in a Hundred Devotions to the Mother of God, easily practiced." The Tenth Letter is dedicated to casuistic procedures to lighten the ritual of confession and to the debate between the respective roles of attrition and contrition; the Jesuit character claiming that simply attrition combined with the sacrament of penance is sufficient for man's salvation, while the narrator insists on the necessity of contrition and of the love of God, citing extracts of the Bible often quoted by the Jansenists, the abbé de Saint-Cyran and Jansenius.

The Thirteenth and Fourteenth Letters criticize the Jesuits' legitimation of homicide. In the latter, Pascal abstains himself from discussing the most scandalous Jesuit propositions, legitimizing tyrannicides and abortions. He quotes, among others, the Church's policies of penance for sinners guilty of willful murder officialized during the Synod of Ancyra (341).

In the Seventeenth Letter, Pascal took up again the problem of efficacious grace and of the "de facto vs de juris" debate concerning the inclusion, or not, of the 5 Propositions condemned by the Pope in the Cum Occasione papal bull, in Jansenius's work (see Formulary controversy for details). Port-Royal and Pascal argued that although the Pope had condemned these 5 Propositions as heretical, they were not to be found in Jansenius. Furthermore, they claimed that the Pope held authority only on matters of faith, and not on technical de facto matters. Thus, drawing on the Jesuits' argumentation itself, Pascal argued here that one could not be held heretical to believe that Jansenius' work did not include these 5 Propositions, and that the Papal condemnation only restricted itself to the heresy itself, not to the question of their inclusion in Jansenius' work. Thus, he recalled the Jesuit Cardinal Bellarmine's sentences concerning the authority of religious councils concerning matters of dogma versus de facto issues; he also recalled the debate between St Athanasius and St Basil concerning the interpretation of Dionysus of Alexandria, who was accused by Basil of Arianism and therefore convoked before the Pope Dionysius in 262; or the various contradictory papal interpretations given to the Scythian monks; as well as another debate concerning Pope Honorius I, who had been later anathematized by the Third Council of Constantinople, although Cardinal Bellarmine defended Honorius' orthodoxy, claiming that the condemned propositions were not to be found in Honorius.

== Reactions and legacy ==
The reaction to the Lettres provinciales was substantial. Pascal's use of wit, humor, and mockery in attacking existing institutions made his work extremely popular. However, its publication was primarily via the underground press, and in 1660 Louis XIV banned the book and ordered it shredded and burned. The Church banned it by placing on the Index Librorum Prohibitorum. (Note: Beacon for Freedom of Expression search for Pascal) Pascal himself had to enter clandestinity, living in cheap hostels. Nevertheless, the letters survived and influenced the prose of later French writers like Voltaire and Jean-Jacques Rousseau. The extract of the Seventh Letter concerning the "direction of intention" influenced Molière's Tartuffe (Act IV, scene V, 1489–1493).

They were first translated into Latin by Antoine Arnauld, and then into many other languages, including English in 1657 (Les Provinciales, or the Mystery of Jesuitisme, discovered in certain letters written upon occasion of the present differences at Sorbonne between the jansenists and the molinists, London, Royston, 1657) by the Anglican theologian Henry Hammond, while in 1684 a polyglot translation (in French, Latin, Spanish and Italian) was published by Balthasar Winfelt. In 1847 an English translation was published by Thomas M'Crie the Younger.

According to his niece Marguerite Périer, Pascal later said that he did not regret publishing the letters, and if he were to do it again he would write more forcefully. He defended the style in which he wrote the letters, explaining that "if I had written dogmatically, my papers would have been only read by the learned, and those who had no need of the information I furnished".

=== Literature ===
Rufus Suter has stated that the letters became "the model for the satirical essay in French". In the 17th century the Letters were the more known and influential of Pascal's two books, but over time it was eclipsed by his Pensées in this regard, as the subject matter of the Letters became less topical. During The Enlightenment the work was of interest as a work of literature, influencing Voltaire's Letters Concerning the English Nation (1733) and Montesquieu's Persian Letters (1721). Voltaire wrote that "All types of eloquence are contained in these letters." He also called them "the best-written book that has yet appeared in France." When Jacques-Bénigne Bossuet was asked what book he would rather have written had he not written his own, he answered, the Provincial Letters of Pascal. Francis X.J. Coleman writes that although the issues discussed in the letters are "superannuated and dusty", "One may not believe a single statement in the New Testament, or in the Aeneid, and still use them with great success in teaching or learning Koiné Greek or classical Latin. The same holds true of the Provincial Letters: they form the most pure masterpiece in the French language".

=== Moral and theological ===
Jean Mesnard writes of the Lettres that they are "the most important example of a whole class of works, a very abundant class, provoked by the debates between the Jesuits and the Jansenists. This controversial literature is to-day little known", while Suter considers them as "the only legacy of Jansenism that continue to inspire the religious imagination".

Pascal's attacks on the Jesuits and their practice of casuistry which he maintained resulted in lax morality were influential, so much so that in 1920 Hilaire Belloc remarked that the Letters "have been in the past unceasingly used, and are even still used, as a weapon against the Catholic Church". Frederick Copleston, in his A History of Philosophy, critiques Pascal's attacks on the Jesuits and casuistry: "He selects for mention and condemnation extreme cases of moral accommodation from certain authors, and he tends to confuse casuistry itself with the abuse of it. Furthermore, he tends to attribute to moral theologians unworthy motives which were certainly absent from their minds". He felt that the letters exhibited a "failure to distinguish between the fundamental and valid principles of moral theology and the abuse of casuistry". However he added that "for good measure he accused the Jesuits of hypocrisy. In one sense he got the better of the dispute. For he was a brilliant writer, whereas his opponents did not produce any answer which was capable of having an effect equal". The doctrine of probabilism, which Pascal condemned as another manifestation of the Jesuits' lax morality, was already under heavy criticism by this time. This was amplified by the Letters and it has been said that they were "especially detrimental to probabilism's long-term reputation".

== Quotes ==
=== On probabilism ===
- "Oh, yes," said he, "we answer just as we please; or rather, I should say, just as it may please those who ask our advice. Here are our rules, taken from Fathers Layman, Vasquez, Sanchez, and the four-and-twenty worthies, in the words of Layman: 'A doctor, on being consulted, may give an advice, not only probable according to his own opinion, but contrary to his own opinion, provided this judgement happens to be more favourable or more agreeable to the person that consults him – si forte haec favorabilior seu exoptatior sit. Nay, I go further and say that there would be nothing unreasonable in his giving those who consult him a judgement held to be probable by some learned person, even though he should be satisfied in his own mind that it is absolutely false.'" (Letter V)
- "In other words," said I, "they have got maxims for the clergy, the nobility, and the commons. Well, I am quite impatient to hear them." (Letter VI)
- "You have a very short memory, returned the monk. "Did I not inform you a little ago that, according to our fathers Cellot and Reginald, 'in matters of morality we are to follow, not the ancient fathers, but the modern casuists?'" (Letter VI)

=== On Antonino Diana's justification of duels ===
- "If a gentleman," says he, in a passage cited by Diana, "who is challenged to fight a duel, is well known to have no religion, and if the vices to which he is openly and unscrupulously addicted are such as would lead people to conclude, in the event of his refusing to fight, that he is actuated, not by the fear of God, but by cowardice, and induce them to say of him that he was a hen, and not a man, gallina, et non vir; in that case he may, to save his honour, appear at the appointed spot – not, indeed, with the express intention of fighting a duel, but merely with that of defending himself, should the person who challenged him come there unjustly to attack him. His action in this case, viewed by itself, will be perfectly indifferent; for what moral evil is there in one stepping into a field, taking a stroll in expectation of meeting a person, and defending one's self in the event of being attacked? And thus the gentleman is guilty of no sin whatever; for in fact it cannot be called accepting a challenge at all, his intention being directed to other circumstances, and the acceptance of a challenge consisting in an express intention to fight, which we are supposing the gentleman never had."
- "You have not kept your word with me, sir," said I. "This is not, properly speaking, to permit duelling; on the contrary, the casuist is so persuaded that this practice is forbidden that, in licensing the action in question, he carefully avoids calling it a duel." (Letter VII)
- "A most pious assassination!" said I. "Still, however, pious though it be, it is assassination, if a man is permitted to kill his enemy in a treacherous manner." (Letter VII)

=== On usury and witchcraft ===
- "Usury, according to our fathers, consists in little more than the intention of taking the interest as usurious. Escobar, accordingly, shows you how you may avoid usury by a simple shift of the intention." (Letter VIII)
- "Distinguo, as Sanchez says, here. If the magician be ignorant of the diabolic art – si sit artis diabolicae ignarus – he is bound to restore: but if he is an expert sorcerer, and has done all in his power to arrive at the truth, the obligation ceases; for the industry of such a magician may be estimated at a certain sum of money."
- "There is some sense in that," I said; "for this is an excellent plan to induce sorcerers to aim at proficiency in their art, in the hope of making an honest livelihood, as you would say, by faithfully serving the public." (Letter VIII)

=== Other ===
- "I would have written a shorter letter, but I did not have the time." (Letter XVI)

== See also ==
- Pensées
- Antoine Le Maistre
- Casuistry
- Catholic moral theology
- Formulary controversy
- Jansenism
- Jesuitism
- Port-Royal Logic

== Bibliography ==
- Les Provinciales – Pensées et Opuscules divers, Lgf/Le Livre de poche, La Pochothèque, 2004, edited by Philippe Sellier & Gérard Ferreyrolles (Les Provinciales are edited here after Louis Cognet's edition) (in French)
