= Bernardino Ciaffoni =

Italian theologian (died 1683)

- Born: Giovanni Bernardino Ciaffoni c. 1615-1620; Sant'Elpidio a Mare, Papal States
- Died: 1683 (aged 63–68); Marche, Papal States
- Occupation: Franciscan theologian

Philosophical work
- Notable works: Apologia

Giovanni Bernardino Ciaffoni (Latinized as Ioannes Bernardinus Ciaffonus, c. 1615–1620 – 1683) was an Italian theologian, Franciscan, and rigorist critic of Catholic probabilism.

His magnum opus, the Apologia, was published posthumously and became controversial in debates about moral theology. It was deemed an offense to Jesuits by the Papal State and placed on the Index of Prohibited Books in 1701.

== Biography ==
Ciaffoni was born in Sant'Elpidio a Mare, a town in the province of Ascoli Piceno in the Papal States, between 1615 and 1620. He entered the Order of Friars Minor convent at a young age. On 14 May 1640, he enrolled at the College of St. Bonaventure in Rome, suggesting a birth date in the late 1610s, as degrees were typically obtained at the age of twenty-two or twenty-four.

He held several prominent roles as teacher, cleric, and administrator within the order. He served for six years as regent of the gymnasium at Recanati and possibly the University of Macerata. He later held similar positions in Fermo, Urbino, Bologna, and finally at the College of St. Bonaventure in Rome, the order's principal institution. From 1664 to 1668, he was provincial of the Marche region of Italy, and from 1668 to 1671 he served as procurator general in Rome. After completing his office, he returned to the Marche where he acted as theologian to the Archbishop of Fermo. He died in the Marche in 1683.

== Theology ==
According to early twentieth-century scholarship by Papini, Ciaffoni wrote numerous manuscripts on philosophical and theological subjects, though none survive. His only known work is a treatise published posthumously, commonly referred to as the Apologia in favore dei Santi Padri ("Apology in favor of the Holy Fathers"). First printed in Turin by Pietro Vianelli in the early 1690s, almost a decade after his death, it was reissued in Bassano del Grappa in 1696 and Avignon, France, in 1698.

In the Apologia, Ciaffoni criticized contemporary theologians, principally Jesuits, who taught probabilism in ethics. Influenced in part by the Provincial Letters of Blaise Pascal, he argued that probabilist casuistry encourages moral laxity by weakening traditional obligations concerning charity, fasting, and other religious duties. He also argued that the Jesuits had departed from the authority of the Church Fathers in moral teachings. His work critiqued Catholic theologians like Louis Cellot, François Annat, Tommaso Tamburini, Antonio Escobar y Mendoza, Gabriel Vásquez, and Étienne Bauny.

The work provoked immediate controversy. Giambattista Benedetti published a critique called La scimia di Montalto ("The monkey of Montalto") in 1698 under a pseudonym accusing Ciaffoni of misrepresenting probabilist authors and imitating Pascal's polemics. In 1701, the Minister General of the Conventual Franciscans, Vincenzo Coronelli, issued a decree distancing the Franciscan order from the work and condemning certain statements critical of the Jesuits. That same year, both Ciaffoni's Apologia and Benedetti's rebuttal were banned and placed on the Index Librorum Prohibitorum.

Despite the official ban, controversy surrounding Ciaffoni's work continued for decades, particularly in the Kingdom of Naples. Other theologians issued replies and counter-replies, including Giovanni Sarconio on April 25, 1708, and Biagio Majoli d'Avitabile in 1709.

The Apologia was reprinted in the Republic of Venice in 1761 and remained influential in later debates within rigorism and Jansenism.

== Works ==
- Apologia in favore dei Santi Padri contro quei che nelle materie morali fanno de medesimo poca stima (c. 1690)
