= Mental reservation =

Position in ethical theory and moral theology

Mental reservation (or mental equivocation) is an ethical theory and a doctrine in moral theology which recognizes the "lie of necessity", and holds that when there is a conflict between justice and telling the truth, it is justice that should prevail. The doctrine is a special branch of casuistry (case-based reasoning) developed in the late Middle Ages and the Renaissance. While associated with the Jesuits, it did not originate with them. It is a theory debated by moral theologians, but not part of Canon law.

== Secular use ==
It was argued in moral theology, and now in ethics, that mental reservation was a way to fulfill obligations both to tell the truth and to keep secrets from those not entitled to know them (for example, because of the seal of the confessional or other clauses of confidentiality). Mental reservation, however, is regarded as unjustifiable without grave reason for withholding the truth. This condition was necessary to preserve a general idea of truth in social relations.

Social psychologists have advanced cases where the actor is confronted with an avoidance-avoidance conflict, in which he both does not want to say the truth and does not want to make an outright lie; in such circumstances, equivocal statements are generally preferred. This type of equivocation has been defined as "nonstraightforward communication...ambiguous, contradictory, tangential, obscure or even evasive." People typically equivocate when posed a question to which all of the possible replies have potentially negative consequences, yet a reply is still expected (the situational theory of communicative conflict).

== Equivocation ==
The Bible contains a good example of equivocation. Abraham was married to Sarah/Sarai, his half-sister by a different mother. Fearing that as he traveled people would covet his beautiful wife and as a result kill him to take her, he counselled her to agree with him when he would say that "she is my sister". This happened on two occasions, first with the Pharaoh of Egypt, told in Genesis 12:11-13, and second, with a king called Abimelech in Genesis 20:12. Abraham later explained to Abimelech that Sarah was indeed his sister, as they shared the same father, although had different mothers. Writers Petrus Serrarius, Giovanni Stefano Menochio and George Leo Haydock also refer to mental reservation as justification for Judith's false explanation that she intended to betray her people to the Assyrians in the deuterocanonical book which bears her name.

A frequently cited example of equivocation is a well-known incident from the life of Athanasius of Alexandria. When Julian the Apostate was seeking Athanasius's death, Athanasius fled Alexandria and was pursued up the Nile. Seeing the imperial officers were gaining on him, Athanasius took advantage of a bend in the river that hid his boat from its pursuers and ordered his boat turned around. When the two boats crossed paths, the Roman officers shouted out, asking if anyone had seen Athanasius. As instructed by Athanasius, his followers shouted back, "Yes, he is not very far off." The pursuing boat hastily continued up the river, while Athanasius returned to Alexandria, where he remained in hiding until the end of the persecution.

Another anecdote often used to illustrate equivocation concerns Francis of Assisi. He once saw a man fleeing from a murderer. When the murderer then came upon Francis, he demanded to know if his quarry had passed that way. Francis answered, "He did not pass this way", sliding his forefinger into the sleeve of his cassock, thus misleading the murderer and saving a life. A variant of this anecdote is cited by the canonist Martin de Azpilcueta to illustrate his doctrine of a mixed speech (oratoria mixta) combining speech and gestural communication.

When there was good reason for using equivocation, its lawfulness was admitted by all moral theologians. Traditionally, the doctrine of mental reservation was intimately linked with the concept of equivocation, which allowed the speaker to employ double meanings of words to tell the literal truth while concealing a deeper meaning.

== Mentalis restrictio in moral theology ==
The traditional teaching of moral theologians is that a lie is intrinsically evil, and therefore, never allowed. However, there are instances where one is also under an obligation to keep secrets faithfully, and sometimes the easiest way of fulfilling that duty is to say what is false, or to tell a lie. Writers of all creeds and of no creed, both ancient and modern, have frankly accepted this position. They admit the doctrine of the "lie of necessity", and maintain that when there is a conflict between justice and veracity it is justice that should prevail. The common Catholic teaching has formulated the theory of mental reservation as a means by which the claims of both justice and veracity can be satisfied.

If there is no good reason to the contrary, truth requires all to speak frankly and openly in such a way as to be understood by those who are addressed. A sin is committed if mental reservations are used without just cause, or in cases when the questioner has a right to the naked truth.

=== Wide mental reservation ===
In "wide mental reservation" the qualification comes from the ambiguity of the words themselves, or from the circumstances of time, place, or person in which they are uttered.

Spanish Dominican Raymond of Peñafort was a noted canon lawyer, and one of the first writers on casuistry, i.e., seeking to resolve moral problems by extracting or extending theoretical rules from a particular case and applying them to new instances. He noted that Augustine of Hippo said that a man must not slay his own soul by lying in order to preserve the life of another, and that it would be a most perilous doctrine to admit that we may do a lesser evil to prevent another doing a greater. He said that while most doctors teach this, he acknowledged that others allow that a lie should be told when a man's life is at stake.

Raymond gave as an example, if one is asked by murderers bent on taking the life of someone hiding in the house whether he is in:

- one could decline to answer, in which case if this betrays him, his death will be imputable to the murderers, not to the other's silence;
- he may use an equivocal expression such as, "He is not at home [to you]", or
- he may say simply that he is not there, and if his conscience tells him that he ought to say that, then he will not speak against his conscience, nor will he sin.

Raymond did not believe that Augustine would have objection to any of these. Those who hear them may understand them in a sense which is not true, but their self-deception may be permitted by the speaker for a good reason.

=== Strict mental reservation ===
According to Malloch and Huntley (1966), this doctrine of permissible "equivocation" did not originate with the Jesuits. They cite a short treatise, in cap. Humanae aures, that had been written by Martin Azpilcueta (also known as Doctor Navarrus), an Augustinian who was serving as a consultant to the Apostolic Penitentiary. It was published in Rome in 1584. The first Jesuit influence upon this doctrine was not until 1609, "when Suarez rejected Azpilcueta's basic proof and supplied another" (speaking of Francisco Suárez).

The 16th-century Spanish theologian Martin de Azpilcueta (often called "Navarrus" because he was born in the Kingdom of Navarre) wrote at length about the doctrine of mentalis restrictio or mental reservation. Navarrus held that mental reservation involved truths "expressed partly in speech and partly in the mind," relying upon the idea that God hears what is in one's mind while human beings hear only what one speaks. Therefore, the Christian's moral duty was to tell the truth to God. Reserving some of that truth from the ears of human hearers was moral if it served a greater good. This is the doctrine of "strict mental reservation", by which the speaker mentally adds some qualification to the words which they utter, and the words together with the mental qualification make a true assertion in accordance with fact.

Navarrus gave the doctrine of mental reservation a far broader and more liberal interpretation than had anyone up to that time. Although some other Catholic theological thinkers and writers took up the argument in favor of strict mental reservation, canonist Paul Laymann opposed it; the concept remained controversial within the Roman Catholic Church, which never officially endorsed or upheld the doctrine and eventually Pope Innocent XI condemned it as formulated by Sanchez in 1679. After this condemnation by the Holy See no Catholic theologian has defended the lawfulness of strict mental reservations.

== England ==
The linked theories of mental reservation and equivocation became notorious in England during the Elizabethan era and the Jacobean era, when Jesuits who had entered England to minister to the spiritual needs of Catholics were captured by the authorities. The Jesuits Robert Southwell (c. 1561–1595) (who was also a poet of note) and Henry Garnet (1555–1606) both wrote treatises on the topic, which was of far more than academic interest to them. Both risked their lives bringing the sacraments to recusant Catholics — and not only their lives, since sheltering a priest was a capital offence. In 1586, Margaret Clitherow had been pressed to death for refusing to enter a plea on the charge of harbouring two priests at York. When caught, tortured and interrogated, Southwell and Garnet practiced mental reservation not to save themselves — their deaths were a foregone conclusion — but to protect their fellow believers.

Southwell, who was arrested in 1592, was accused at his trial of having told a witness that even if she was forced by the authorities to swear under oath, it was permissible to lie to conceal the whereabouts of a priest. Southwell replied that that was not what he had said. He had said that "to an oath were required justice, judgement and truth", but the rest of his answer goes unrecorded because one of the judges angrily shouted him down. Convicted in 1595, Southwell was hanged, drawn and quartered. More famous in his own era was Henry Garnet, who wrote a defense of Southwell in 1598; Garnet was captured by the authorities in 1606 due to his alleged involvement in the Gunpowder Plot. Facing the same accusations as Southwell, his attempts to defend himself met with no better result: later that year, Garnet was executed in the same fashion.

The Protestants considered these doctrines as mere justifications for lies. Catholic ethicists also voiced objections: the Jansenist "Blaise Pascal...attacked the Jesuits in the seventeenth century for what he saw as their moral laxity." "By 1679, the doctrine of strict mental reservation put forward by Navarrus had become such a scandal that Pope Innocent XI officially condemned it." Other casuists justifying mental reservation included Thomas Sanchez, who was criticized by Pascal in his Provincial Letters – although Sanchez added various restrictions (it should not be used in ordinary circumstances, when one is interrogated by competent magistrates, when a creed is requested, even for heretics, etc.), which were ignored by Pascal.

This type of equivocation was famously mocked in the porter's speech in Shakespeare's Macbeth, in which the porter directly alludes to the practice of deceiving under oath by means of equivocation. "Faith, here's an equivocator, that could swear in both the scales against either scale; who committed treason enough for God's sake, yet could not equivocate to heaven." (Macbeth, Act 2, Scene 3)

See, for example Robert Southwell and Henry Garnet, author of A Treatise of Equivocation (published secretly c. 1595)—to whom, it is supposed, Shakespeare was specifically referring. Shakespeare made the reference to priests because the religious use of equivocation was well known in those periods of early modern England (e.g. under James VI/I) when it was a capital offence for a Roman Catholic priest to enter England. A Jesuit priest would equivocate in order to protect himself from the secular authorities without (in his eyes) committing the sin of lying.

Following Innocent XI's condemnation of strict mental reservation, equivocation (or wide mental reservation) was still considered orthodox, and was revived and defended by Alphonsus Liguori. The Jesuit Gabriel Daniel wrote in 1694 Entretiens de Cleanthe et d'Eudoxe sur les lettres provinciales, a reply to Pascal's Provincial Letters in which he accused Pascal of lying, or even of having himself used mental reservation, by not mentioning all the restrictions imposed by Sanchez on the use of this form of deception.

In his licentiate thesis, Edouard Guilloux says that it is shown from the study of language "that there can be a gap between what a speaker means when he utters a given sentence and the literal meaning of that same sentence", yet "the literal meaning of a sentence must be apt to convey what the speaker means: the speaker cannot authentically be said to have meant to say something that has no relation to the literal meaning of the sentence he utters." "Since the non-literal meaning intended by the speaker can be detected in the circumstances of his utterance, he can authentically be said to have meant to say it, and if that meaning yields a true statement, then he has said nothing false." According to Alphonsus Liguori, for the licit use of a mental reservation, "an absolutely serious cause is not required; any reasonable cause is enough, for instance to free oneself from the inconvenient and unjust interrogation of another." Alphonsus said, "we do not deceive our neighbor, but for a just cause we allow that he deceive himself."

The New Catholic Encyclopedia says, "A man can affirm that he had coffee and toast for breakfast without denying that he had an egg, or he might affirm that he has a lesser amount of money in his pocket without denying that he also has a greater amount. So long as he has reasonable cause to conceal part of the truth, he does no wrong, provided, of course, that he is careful not to indicate that he has 'only' so much to eat or that he has 'only' so much money." Also, if "a wife, who has been unfaithful but after her lapse has received the Sacrament of Penance, is asked by her husband if she has committed adultery, she could truthfully reply: 'I am free from sin.'"

== Legacy ==
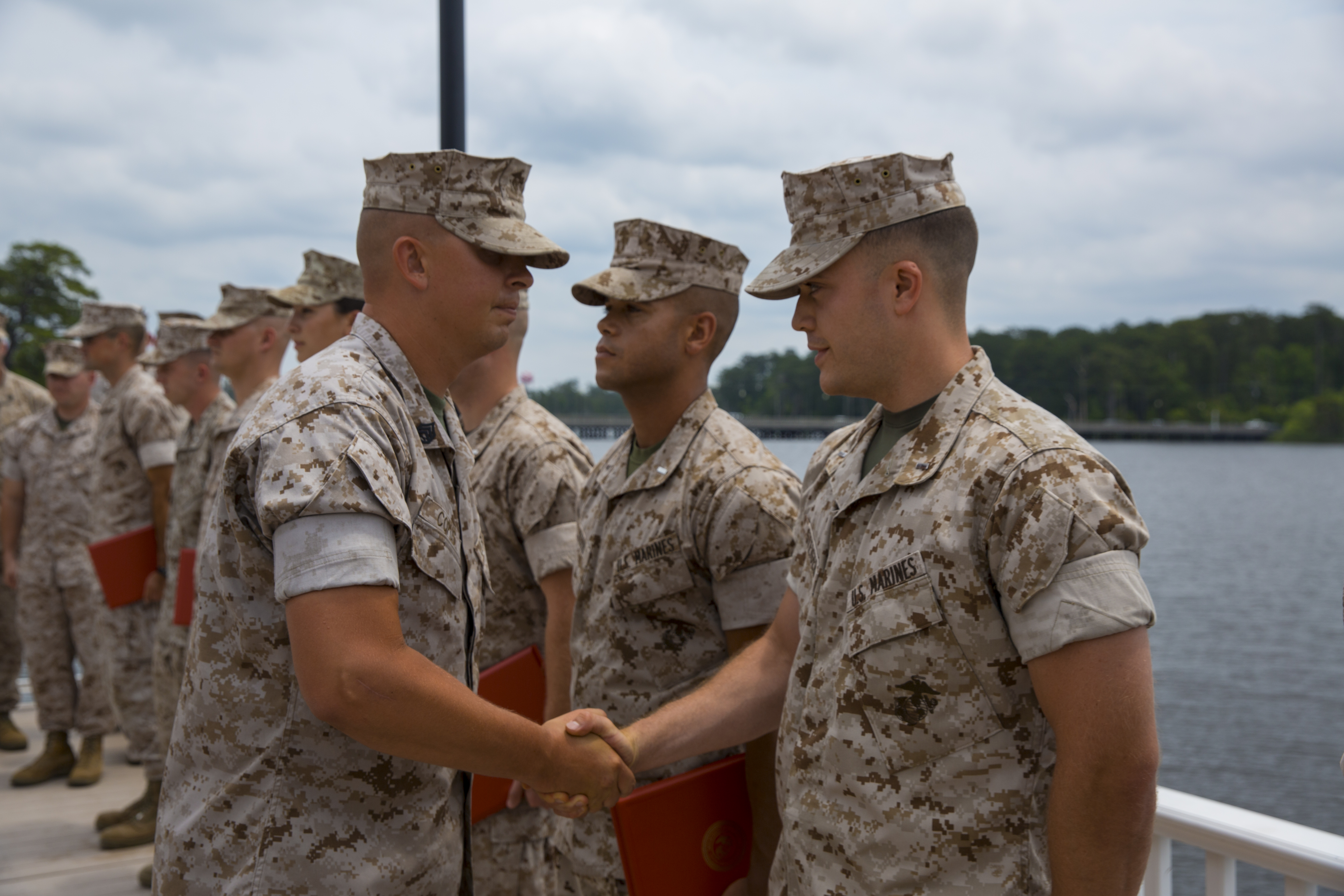
Many oaths, such as those in the US military, state the oathmaker swears "without mental reservation".

=== Kant and Constant ===
This type of untruth was condemned by Kant in On a supposed right to lie. Kant was debating against Benjamin Constant, who had claimed, from a consequentialist stance opposed to Kant's categorical imperative, that: "To tell the truth is thus a duty; but it is only in respect to one who has a right to the truth. But no one has a right to a truth which injures others."

On the other hand, Kant asserted in the Groundwork of the Metaphysic of Morals that lying, or deception of any kind, would be forbidden under any interpretation and in any circumstance. In Groundwork, Kant gives the example of a person who seeks to borrow money without intending to pay it back. The maxim of this action, says Kant, results in a contradiction in conceivability (and thus contradicts perfect duty) because it would logically contradict the reliability of language. If it is universally acceptable to lie, then no one would believe anyone and all truths would be assumed to be lies (this last clause was accepted by casuists, hence the reasons for restrictions given to the cases where deception was authorized). The right to deceive could also not be claimed because it would deny the status of the person deceived as an end in himself, and the theft would be incompatible with a possible kingdom of ends. Therefore, Kant denied the right to lie or deceive for any reason, regardless of context or anticipated consequences. However, it was permissible to remain silent or say no more than needed (such as in the infamous example of a murderer asking to know where someone is).

=== Others ===
The doctrines have also been criticized by Sissela Bok and by Paul Ekman, who defines lies by omission as the main form of lying – though larger and more complex moral and ethical issues of lying and truth-telling extend far beyond these specific doctrines. Ekman, however, does not consider cases of deception where "it is improper to question" the truth as real form of deceptions – this sort of case, where communication of truth is not to be expected and so deception is justified, was included by casuists.

=== In Ireland ===
The Irish Catholic Church allegedly misused the concept of mental reservation when dealing with situations relating to clerical child sexual abuse, by disregarding the restrictions placed on its employment by moral theologians and treating it as a method that "allows clerics (to) mislead people...without being guilty of lying", for example when dealing with the police, victims, civil authorities and media. In the Murphy Report into the sexual abuse scandal in the Catholic archdiocese of Dublin, Cardinal Desmond Connell describes it thus:

Well, the general teaching about mental reservation is that you are not permitted to tell a lie. On the other hand, you may be put in a position where you have to answer, and there may be circumstances in which you can use an ambiguous expression realising that the person who you are talking to will accept an untrue version of whatever it may be – permitting that to happen, not willing that it happened, that would be lying. It really is a matter of trying to deal with extraordinarily difficult matters that may arise in social relations where people may ask questions that you simply cannot answer. Everybody knows that this kind of thing is liable to happen. So mental reservation is, in a sense, a way of answering without lying.

Cathleen Kaveny, writing in the Catholic magazine Commonweal, notes that Henry Garnet in his treatise on the topic took pains to argue that no form of mental reservation was justified — and might even be a mortal sin — if it would run contrary to the requirements of faith, charity or justice. But according to the Murphy Report:

The Dublin Archdiocese's preoccupations in dealing with cases of child sexual abuse, at least until the mid 1990s, were the maintenance of secrecy, the avoidance of scandal, the protection of the reputation of the church, and the preservation of its assets. All other considerations, including the welfare of children and justice for victims, were subordinated to these priorities. The archdiocese did not implement its own canon-law rules and did its best to avoid any application of the law of the state.

Kaveny concludes: "The truths of faith are illuminated by the lives of the martyrs. Southwell and Garnet practiced mental reservation to save innocent victims while sacrificing themselves. The Irish prelates practiced mental reservation to save themselves while sacrificing innocent victims. And that difference makes all the difference."

=== In secular law ===
In the Australian case of Deacon v Transport Regulation Board (Supreme Court of Victoria, 1956), Deacon argued that payments for interstate transport licensing had been made under duress and should be reimbursed. The court held that on the facts of the case, payment had been made voluntarily, and without protest, and observed that

No secret mental reservation of the doer is material. The question is - what would his conduct indicate to a reasonable man as his mental state?

The case and the same wording were referenced in the 1979 English case of North Ocean Shipping Co. Ltd. v Hyundai Construction Co., Ltd.

== See also ==
- Economy (religion)
- Evasion (ethics)
- Lying by omission
- Marrano
- Mesirah
- Shifting ground fallacy
- So help me God
- Taqiyya
- You can't have your cake and eat it
- Crypto-Papism
