= François Annat =

French Jesuit, theologian, writer (1590–1670)

François Annat (1590 – 14 June 1670) was a French Jesuit, theologian, writer, and one of the foremost opponents of Jansenism.

== Biography ==
Annat was born in Rodes, and entered the novitiate of the Society of Jesus on 16 February 1607. He was professor of philosophy for six years, and theology for seven, in the college of his order in Toulouse, of which he was subsequently appointed rector. Later he filled the same office at Montpellier. He was assistant to the General in Rome, and Provincial of Paris. In 1654 he was sent to the court as confessor of Louis XIV, and, after the faithful discharge of the duties of his office, he felt compelled to resign, owing to the King's extramarital relationship with Louise de la Vallière.

He became known to the academic world in 1632, by a publication of a defense of the Jesuit doctrine of divine grace against the Oratorian Gibieuf. In 1644 he began a series of more lengthy contributions of the famous controversy that sought to reconcile human freedom with divine efficacious grace. He was prominent in defending Catholic orthodoxy against the attacks of the Port-Royal theologians, and in consequence came to the notice of Pascal, who directed the last of the Provincial Letters against Annat. His opinions on Catholic probabilism were critiqued by contemporary Franciscan theologian Bernardino Ciaffoni.

A full description of Annat's published works may be found in Carlos Sommervogel's Bibliothèque de la Compagnie de Jésus (Jesuit Bibliography). A complete edition, in three volumes, of his writings appeared in Paris, in 1666, under the title Opuscula Theologica. Annat died in Paris on 14 June 1670.

== Sources ==
See also The Life and Career of François Annat, SJ: the Failure of his Antijansenism, May 1641--October 1608. Van Hove, Brian William. The Catholic University of America: ProQuest Dissertations Publishing, 1999, 9925215.
