= Thomas Sanchez =

Spanish theologian (1550–1610)

Tomás Sánchez SJ (1550 – 19 May 1610) was a 16th-century Spanish Jesuit and famous casuist.

== Life ==
In 1567 he entered the Society of Jesus. He was at first refused admittance on account of an impediment in his speech; however, after imploring delivery from this impediment before a picture of Mary at Córdoba, Spain, his application was granted. For a time he was the Master of Novices at Granada. The remainder of his life was devoted to the composition of his works. He died of pneumonia.

His contemporaries bear testimony to the energy and perseverance with which he laboured towards self-perfection from his novitiate until his death. His penitential zeal rivalled that of the early anchorites, and, according to his spiritual director, he carried his baptismal innocence to the grave. Luis de la Puente, then rector of the college of Granada and later declared "venerable", attests the holiness of Sanchez in his letter to Francisco Suárez, a translation of which may be found in the Bibliothèque de Bourgogne at Brussels.

== Works and condemnation ==
The chief work of Sanchez (and the only one that he himself edited) is the Disputationes de sancto matrimonii sacramento. The first edition is said to have appeared at Genoa in 1602; but this can have been only the first folio volume, for which permission to print was secured in 1599, as the two succeeding volumes contain both in their preface and the author's dedication the date 1603. The first complete edition was, according to Sommervogel, that of Madrid, 1605; later followed a series of editions printed at different places both before and after the author's death. The last edition seems to have been issued at Venice in 1754.

Some editions of the third volume have been placed on the Index of Prohibited Books, the grounds being not the doctrine of the author, but the supposed perversion of the work and suppression of what the author taught. Even in the earlier editions of the Index as revised by Leo XIII, until his Constitution "Officorum ac munerum", there appears:

"Sanchez, Thom. Disputationum de Sacramento Matrimonii tom. III. Ed. Venetiae, sive alarium, a quibus 1.8 disp. 7 detractus est integer num. 4. Decr. 4 Febr. 1627."

This number is omitted from the edition of Venice, 1614; it treats of the power of the pope to grant a valid legitimation of the offspring of marriages invalid only through canon law through the so-called sanatio in radice.

Soon after the death of Sanchez a second work appeared. Opus morale in præcepta Decalogi; the first folio volume was prepared by the author himself, but the second volume, as well as the whole of his third work, Consilia moralia, had to be compiled from manuscript notes. These works also went through a series of different editions, and likewise drew upon themselves the accusation of laxity, especially with reference to the question of what is called "mental reservation" (restrictio mentalis). Blaise Pascal in particular criticized him in his Provincial Letters.

Of the 26 thesis condemned by Pope Innocent XI, several were in Sanchez's works (see op. mor. in præc. Decalogi, III, vi, n. 15). One of them stated:

If anyone, by himself, or before others, whether under examination or of his own accord, whether for amusement or for any other purpose, should swear that he has not done something which he has really done, having in mind something else which he has not done, or some way of doing it other than the way he employed, or anything else that is true: he does not lie nor perjure himself.

According to Franz Xavier Wernz, Sanchez's work De matrimonio was reckoned by the Roman Curia among the classical works on marriage.

Sanchez advocated for the missionary position for sexual intercourse, calling it the "natural manner" and claiming that "this manner is more appropriate for the effusion of the male seed, for its reception into the female vessel."
