= Cardinals created by Innocent XI =

Catholic appointments from 1681 to 1686

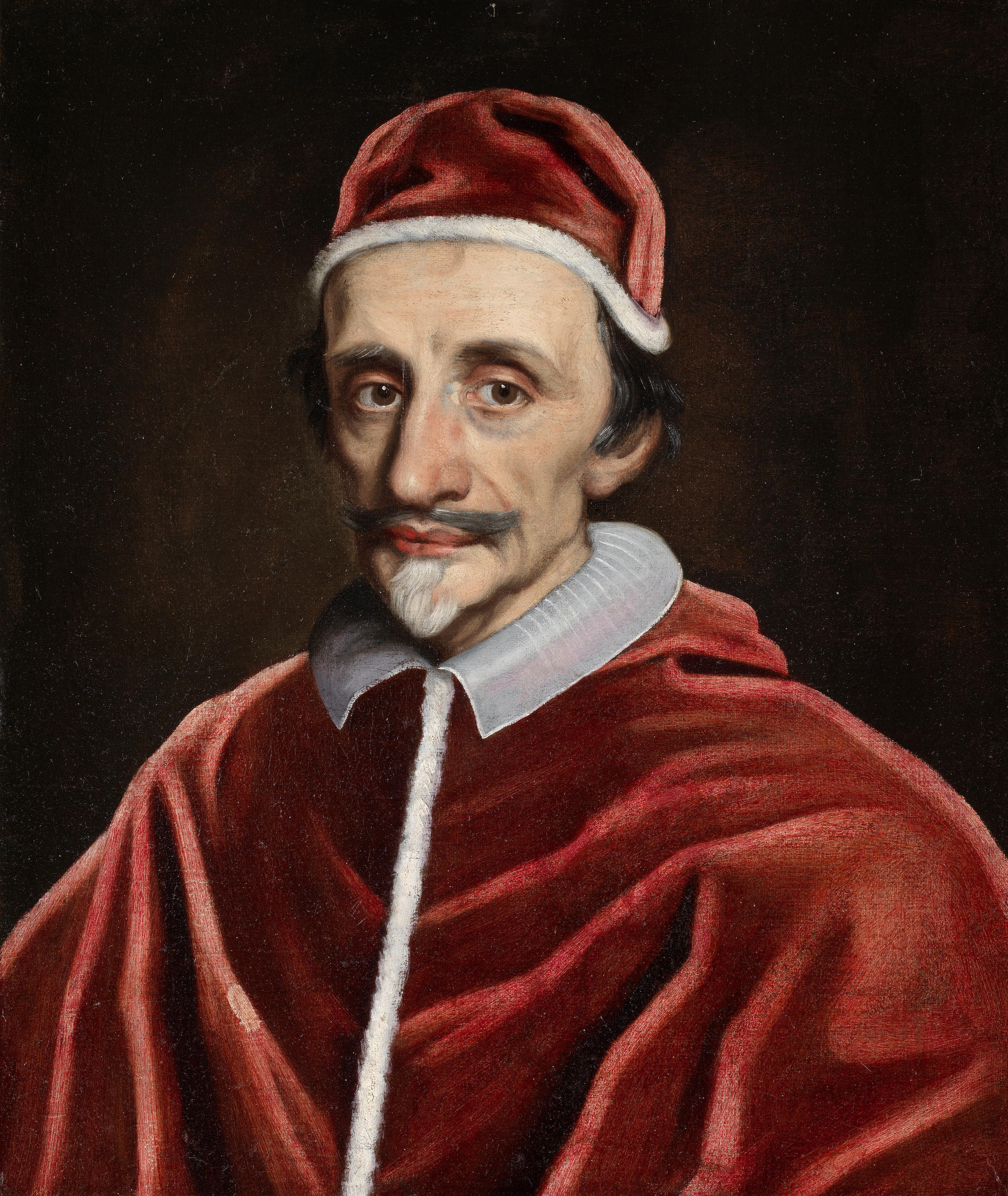
Pope Innocent XI (1611-89)

Pope Innocent XI (1676–1689) created forty three new cardinals in two consistories:

== Consistory of 1 September 1681 ==
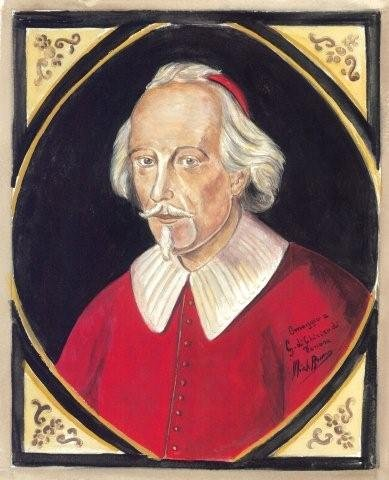
Giovanni Battista de Luca (1614-83), made a cardinal on September 1, 1681.

1. Giambattista Spinola (seniore), governor of Rome – cardinal-priest of S. Cecilia (received the title on 22 September 1681), then cardinal-priest of S. Agnese fuori le mura (20 February 1686), cardinal-priest of S. Maria in Trastevere (7 April 1698), † 4 January 1704
2. Antonio Pignatelli, archbishop of Lecce – cardinal-priest of S. Pancrazio (received the title on 22 September 1681), became Pope Innocent XII on 12 July 1691, † 27 September 1700
3. Stefano Brancaccio, bishop of Viterbo – cardinal-priest of S. Maria della Pace (received the title on 22 September 1681), † 8 September 1682
4. Stefano Agostini, datary of His Holiness, titular archbishop of Heraclea – cardinal-priest of S. Giovanni a Porta Latina (received the title on 22 September 1681), † 21 March 1683
5. Francesco Buonvisi, titular archbishop of Tessalonica, nuncio in Austria – cardinal-priest of S. Stefano al Monte Celio (received the title on 14 November 1689), † 25 August 1700
6. Savo Millini, titular archbishop of Cesarea, nuncio in Spain – cardinal-priest of S. Maria del Popolo (received the title on 12 August 1686), then cardinal-priest of S. Pietro in Vincoli (12 December 1689), † 10 February 1701
7. Federico Visconti, archbishop-elect of Milan – cardinal-priest of S. Alessio (received the title on 22 September 1681), † 7 January 1693
8. Marco Galli, bishop of Rimini – cardinal-priest of S. Pietro in Montorio (received the title on 17 November 1681), † 24 July 1683
9. Flaminio Taja, auditor of the Sacred Roman Rota – cardinal-priest of SS. Nereo ed Achilleo (received the title on 17 November 1681), † 5 October 1682
10. Raimondo Capizucchi, O.P., master of the Apostolic Palace – cardinal-priest of S. Stefano al Monte Celio (received the title on 22 September 1681), then cardinal-priest of S. Maria degli Angeli (3 March 1687), † 22 April 1691
11. Giovanni Battista De Luca, auditor of His Holiness – cardinal-priest of S. Girolamo degli Schiavoni (received the title on 22 September 1681), † 5 February 1683
12. Francesco Lorenzo Brancati di Lauria, O.F.M.Conv. – cardinal-priest of S. Agostino (received the title on 22 September 1681), then cardinal-priest of SS. XII Apostoli (1 December 1681), † 30 November 1693
13. Urbano Sacchetti, auditor of the Apostolic Chamber – cardinal-deacon of S. Maria della Scala (received the title on 22 September 1681), then cardinal-deacon of S. Maria in Via Lata (28 November 1689), cardinal-priest of S. Bernardo alle Terme (22 December 1693), cardinal-priest of S. Maria in Trastevere (14 January 1704, † 6 April 1705
14. Gianfrancesco Ginetti, treasurer general of the Apostolic Chamber – cardinal-deacon of S. Maria della Scala (received the title on 22 September 1681), then cardinal-deacon of S. Angelo in Pescheria (12 January 1682), cardinal-deacon of S. Nicola in Carcere (28 November 1689), † 18 September 1691
15. Benedetto Pamphili, O.S.Io.Hieros., grand prior in Rome of the Order of S. John of Jerusalem – cardinal-deacon of S. Maria in Portico (received the title on 22 September 1681), then cardinal-deacon of S. Cesareo in Palatio (30 April 1685), cardinal-deacon of S. Maria in Cosmedin (30 September 1686), cardinal-deacon of S. Agata in Suburra (17 May 1688), cardinal-deacon of S. Maria in Via Lata (22 December 1693), † 22 March 1730
16. Michelangelo Ricci, secretary of the S.C. for Indulgences and Sacred Relics – cardinal-deacon of S. Maria in Aquiro (received the title on 17 November 1681), † 12 May 1682

== Consistory of 2 September 1686 ==
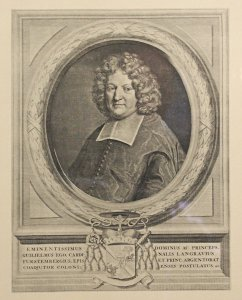
Wilhelm Egon von Fürstenberg (1629-1704), made a cardinal on September 2, 1686.

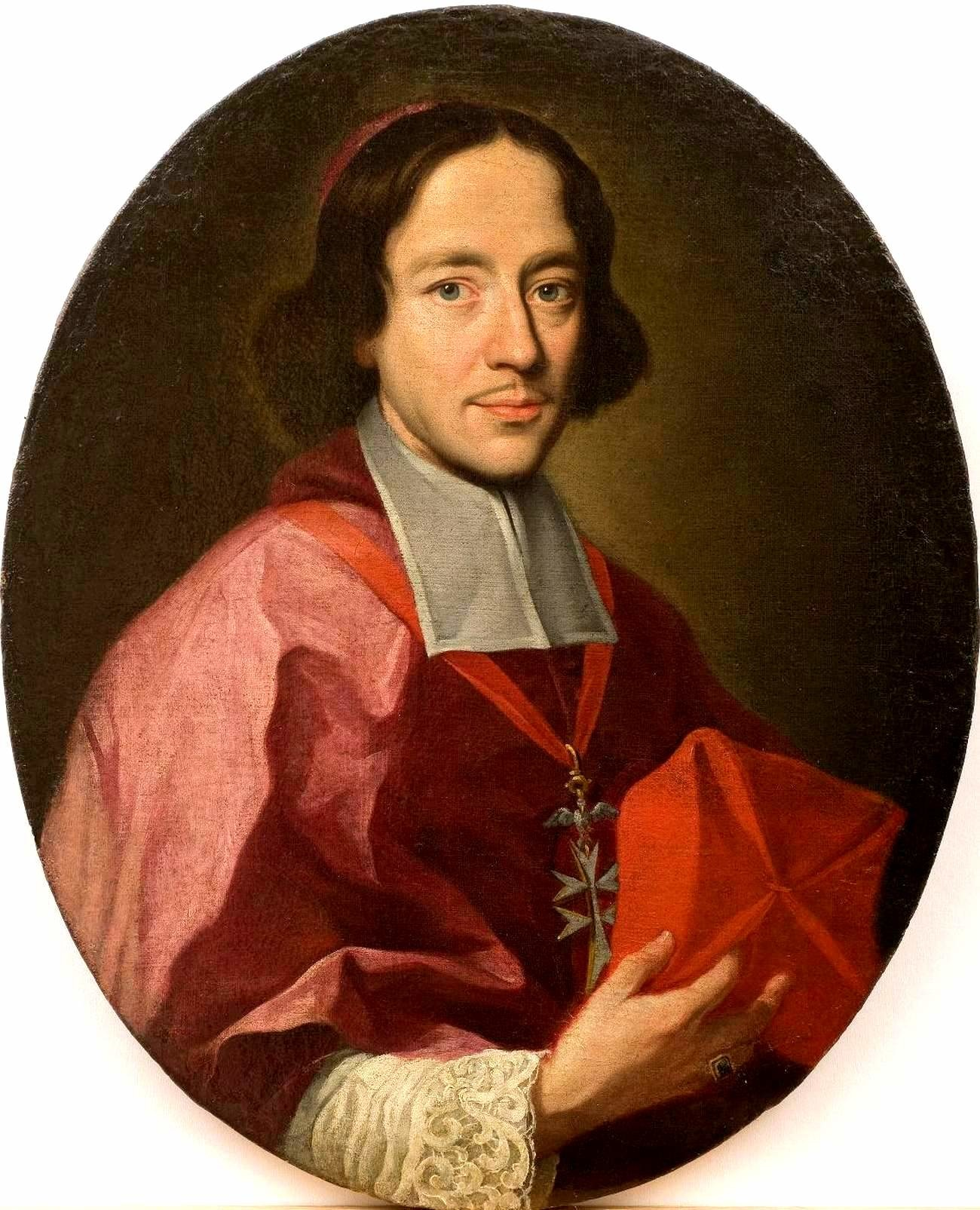
Jan Kazimierz Denhoff (1649-97), made a cardinal on September 2, 1686.

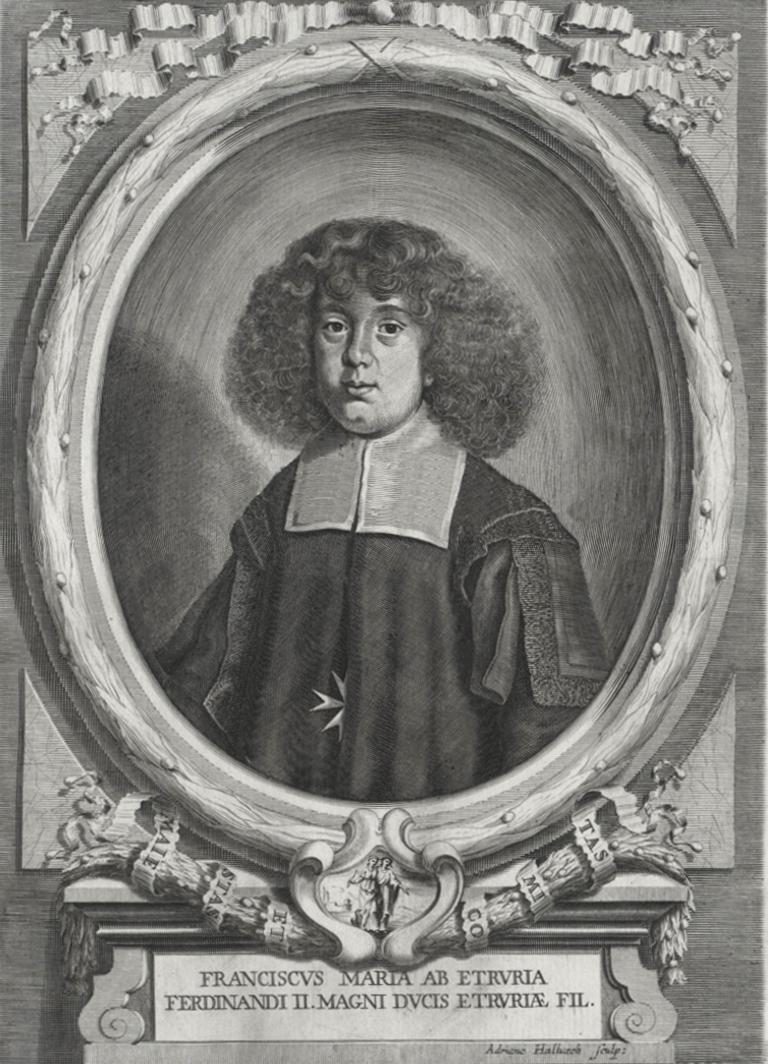
Francesco Maria de' Medici (1660-1711), made a cardinal on September 2, 1686.

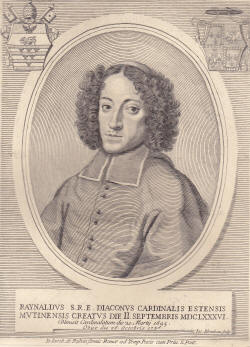
Rinaldo d'Este (1655–1737), made a cardinal on September 2, 1686.

1. Giacomo de Angelis, vicegerent of Rome – cardinal-priest of S. Maria in Aracoeli (received the title on 30 September 1686), † 15 September 1695
2. Opizio Pallavicini, titular archbishop of Ephesus, nuncio in Poland – cardinal-priest of SS. Silvestro e Martino (received the title on 14 November 1689), † 11 February 1700
3. Angelo Maria Ranuzzi, bishop of Fano – cardinal-priest [no title assigned], † 27 September 1689
4. Maximilian Gandolph von Künburg, archbishop of Salzburg – cardinal-priest [no title assigned], † 3 May 1687
5. Veríssimo de Lencastre – cardinal-priest [no title assigned], † 12 December 1692
6. Marcello Durazzo, titular archbishop of Chalcedon, nuncio in Spain – cardinal-priest of S. Prisca (received the title on 14 November 1689), then cardinal-priest of S. Pietro in Vincoli (21 February 1701), † 27 April 1710
7. Orazio Mattei, titular archbishop of Damascus – cardinal-priest of S. Lorenzo in Panisperna (received the title on 30 September 1686), † 18 January 1688
8. Marcantonio Barbarigo, bishop of Corfu – cardinal-priest of S. Susanna (received the title on 30 September 1686), then cardinal-priest of S. Marco (1 July 1697), † 26 May 1706
9. Carlo Stefano Anastasio Ciceri, bishop of Como – cardinal-priest of S. Agostino (received the title on 7 July 1687), † 24 June 1694
10. Leopold Karl von Kollonitsch, bishop of Wiener Neustadt – cardinal-priest of S. Girolamo degli Schiavoni (received the title on 14 November 1689), † 20 January 1707
11. Etienne Le Camus, bishop of Grenoble – cardinal-priest of S. Maria degli Angeli (received the title on 8 August 1691), † 12 September 1707
12. Johannes von Goes, bishop of Gurk – cardinal-priest of S. Pietro in Montorio (received the title on 14 November 1689), † 19 October 1696
13. Augustyn Michał Stefan Radziejowski, bishop of Warmia – cardinal-priest of S. Maria della Pace (received the title on 14 November 1689), † 11 October 1705
14. Pier Matteo Petrucci, Orat., bishop of Jesi – cardinal-priest of S. Marcello (received the title on 9 June 1687), † 5 July 1701
15. Pedro de Salazar Gutiérrez de Toledo, bishop of Salamanca– cardinal-priest of S. Croce in Gerusalemme (received the title on 14 November 1689), † 15 August 1706
16. Wilhelm Egon von Fürstenberg, bishop of Strasbourg – cardinal-priest of S. Onofrio (received the title on 14 November 1689), † 9 April 1704
17. Jan Kazimierz Denhoff, preceptor of the Hospital S. Spirito in Sassia of Rome – cardinal-priest of S. Giovanni a Porta Latina (received the title on 30 September 1686), † 20 June 1697
18. José Saenz d'Aguirre, O.S.B. – cardinal-priest of S. Balbina (received the title on 10 November 1687), then S. Maria sopra Minerva (30 August 1694), † 19 August 1699
19. Leandro Colloredo, Orat. – cardinal-priest of S. Pietro in Montorio (received the title on 30 September 1686), then cardinal-priest of SS. Nereo ed Achilleo (7 November 1689), cardinal-priest of S. Maria in Trastevere (27 April 1705), † 11 January 1709
20. Fortunato Ilario Carafa della Spina – cardinal-priest of SS. Giovanni e Paolo (received the title on 7 July 1687), † 16 January 1697
21. Domenico Maria Corsi, auditor of the Apostolic Chamber – cardinal-deacon of S. Eustachio (received the title on 30 September 1686), then cardinal-priest of S. Pietro in Montorio (3 December 1696), † 6 November 1697
22. Giovanni Francesco Negroni, treasurer of His Holiness – cardinal-deacon of S. Cesareo in Palatio (received the title on 30 September 1686), then cardinal-deacon of S. Maria in Aracoeli (2 January 1696), cardinal-priest of S. Maria in Aracoeli (2 September 1696), † 1 January 1713
23. Fulvio Astalli – cardinal-deacon of S. Giorgio in Velabro (received the title on 30 September 1686), then cardinal-deacon of S. Maria in Cosmedin (17 May 1688), cardinal-deacon of SS. Cosma e Damiano (19 October 1689), cardinal-priest of SS. Quirico e Giulitta (19 February 1710), cardinal-priest of S. Pietro in Vincoli (7 May 1710), cardinal-bishop of Sabina (16 April 1714), cardinal-bishop of Ostia e Velletri (26 April 1719), † 14 January 1721
24. Gasparo Cavalieri – cardinal-deacon of S. Maria in Aquiro (received the title on 30 September 1686), then cardinal-deacon of S. Giorgio in Velabro (17 May 1688), cardinal-deacon of S. Angelo in Pescheria (28 November 1689), † 17 August 1690
25. Johannes Walter Sluse, secretary of Apostolic Briefs – cardinal-deacon of S. Maria della Scala (received the title on 30 September 1686), † 7 July 1687
26. Francesco Maria de' Medici, son of the Grand Duke of Tuscany – cardinal-deacon of S. Maria in Domnica (received the title on 9 July 1687); resigned the cardinalate on 19 June 1709, † 3 February 1711
27. Rinaldo d'Este, son of the Grand Duke of Modena – cardinal-deacon of S. Maria della Scala (received the title on 20 December 1688); resigned the cardinalate on 21 March 1695, † 22 October 1737

== Sources ==
- Miranda, Salvador. "Consistories for the creation of Cardinals 17th Century (1605-1700): Innocent XI (1676-1689)". The Cardinals of the Holy Roman Church. Florida International University. OCLC 53276621.
- R. Ritzler: Hierarchia Catholica, vol. V, Münster 1952
