= Tommaso Tamburini =

Italian theologian

Tommaso Tamburini (6 March 1591 – 10 October 1675) was an Italian Jesuit moral theologian.

== Life ==
Also known under the name of R. P. Thoma Tamburino.

He was born at Caltanisetta in Sicily in 1591, and entered the Society of Jesus when he was fifteen years old. There, he became distinguished for a talent for teaching. After a successful course of studies, he held the professorship of philosophy for four years, of dogmatic theology for seven years, and of moral theology for seventeen years. He was rector of various colleges for thirteen years. His opinions on Catholic probabilism were critiqued by contemporary Franciscan theologian Bernardino Ciaffoni.

He died in Palermo in 1675.

== Works ==
His writings are:

- Theologia moralis by Tommaso Tamburini (Book)

10 editions published between 1734 and 1979 in Latin and Undetermined and held by 23 libraries worldwide

- Methodus expeditae confessionis, tum pro confessariis tum pro poenitentibus complectens libros quator by Tommaso Tamburini (Book)

2 editions published between 1728 and 1761 in Latin and held by 18 libraries worldwide

- R.P. Thomae Tamburini Societate Iesu Siculi Caltanisettensis, in celebri vniuersitate nobilis ciuitatis Messanae, theologiae primarij professoris, Explicatio decalogi, duabus distincta partibus : in qua omnes fere conscientiae casus ad decem praecepta pertinentes, mira breuitate, claritate, & quantum licet, benignitate declarantur by Tommaso Tamburini (Book)

15 editions published between 1659 and 1702 in Latin and Undetermined and held by 13 libraries worldwide

- Methodus expeditae confessionis, tum pro consessariis [sic] tum pro poenitentibus : complectens libros quatuor by Tommaso Tamburini (Book)

5 editions published between 1653 and 1761 in Latin and held by 11 libraries worldwide and one private collector

- De sacrificio message expedite celebrando, libri III by Tommaso Tamburini (Book)

4 editions published between 1657 and 1699 in Latin and held by 10 libraries worldwide

- Methodus expeditae communionis tum pro sacerdotibus, tum pro omnibus fidelibus communicaturis. : Liber unicus in quo omnes fere conscientiae casus ad eucharistiae sacramentum qua ministrandum, qua suscipiendum spectantes ... deciduntur by Thomas Tamburinus (Book)

3 editions published between 1656 and 1666 in Latin and held by 9 libraries worldwide

- Methodus expeditae confessionis tum pro confessariis, tum pro poenitentibus, : complectens libros quinque : in qui omnes fere conscientiae casus ad poenitentiae sacramentum qua ministrandum, qua suscipients pertinentes ... enodantur by Thomas Tamburinus (Book)

1 edition published in 1656 in Latin and held by 9 libraries worldwide

- Opera omnia by Tommaso Tamburini (Book)

5 editions published between 1673 and 1792 in Latin and Undetermined and held by 6 libraries worldwide

- R. P. Thomæ Tamburini ... Explicatio decalogi, duabus distincta partibus; : in qua omnes fere conscientiæ casus, ad decem præcepta pertinentes, mira brevitate ... declarantur by Tommaso Tamburini (Book)

4 editions published between 1659 and 1719 in Latin and held by 6 libraries worldwide

- De sacrificio missae expedite celebrando libri tres by Tommaso Tamburini (Book)

3 editions published between 1556 and 1666 in Latin and Undetermined and held by 5 libraries worldwide

- Methodus expeditae confessionis, tum pro confessariis tum pro poenitentibus : complectens libros quatuor by Tommaso Tamburini (Book)

3 editions published between 1650 and 1728 in Latin and held by 4 libraries worldwide and one private collector

- Theologia moralis R. P. Thomæ Tamburini by Thomas Tamburini (Book)

1 edition published in 1755 in Latin and held by 4 libraries worldwide

- R.P. Thomæ Tamburini Caltanisettensis Societatis Jesu Juris divini, naturalis, et ecclesiastici expedita moralis explicatio : complectens tractatus tres, De sacramentis, quæ sunt de jure divino. De contractibus, quos dirigit jus naturale. De censuris, et irregularitate, quæ sunt de jure ecclesiastico. Accedit tractatus Bullæ cruciatæ, in theologorum, aliorumque animarum curam habentium commodum by Tommaso Tamburini (Book)

2 editions published between 1726 and 1734 in Latin and held by 2 libraries worldwide
1 rare edition was published around 1660-1670, in Latin, unknown holder (possible a private collector)

- .P. Thomæ Tamburini ... explicatio decalogi : duabus distincta partibus by Tommaso Tamburini (Book)

2 editions published between 1678 and 1707 in Latin and held by 3 libraries worldwide

- R.P. Thomæ Tamburini Caltanisettensis Societatis Jesu ... Theologia moralis : in qua declarantur sequentes tractatus, nempè: De decalogi præceptis. De sacramentis. De contractibus. De censuris & irregularitate. De bulla cruciatæ. De confessione. De communione. De sacrificio missæ. De quinque ecclesiæ præceptis by Tommaso Tamburini (Book)

1 edition published in 1734 in Latin and held by 3 libraries worldwide

- Methodvs expeditæ confessionis, tvm pro confessariis tum pro pœnitentibus : complectens libros quinque by Tommaso Tamburini (Book)

1 edition published in 1656 in Latin and held by 3 libraries worldwide

- Methodus expeditae confessionis by Tommaso Tamburini (Book)

5 editions published between 1653 and 1658 in Undetermined and Latin and held by 2 libraries worldwide

- Methodus expeditae communionis by Tommaso Tamburini (Book)

5 editions published between 1656 and 1678 in Undetermined and Latin and held by 2 libraries worldwide and one private collector

His works are unique, representing the new standards of jurisprudencia.

Though severe towards himself, Tamburini, when deciding cases of conscience for others, was inclined to follow the milder views which he found reputable authors declaring probable. This is the basis of the accusation of laxity frequently brought against him, and led to his controversy with Vincent Baron. Tamburini published a rejection of the attacks of his adversary under the title, "Germana doctrina R.P. Th. Tamburini, S.J."

Alphonsus Liguori in his "Theologia Moralis" wrote: "Let us add a word about this author [Tamburino], who is not estimated by many at his full value. It cannot be denied that he was apt to consider some opinions probable which do not deserve that note; hence he must be used with caution. But when Tamburini establishes his own opinions, he shows that he is a thorough theologian and solves the questions by reducing them to their last principles. Competent judges will find that the opinions which he then sets down as the more tenable are in the majority of cases the more correct".
