= Antonino Diana =

- Born: 1585; Palermo, Kingdom of Sicily
- Died: 20 July 1663 (aged 77–78); Rome, Papal States
- Occupation: Theologian

Antonino Diana (c. 1586 – July 20, 1663) was a Catholic moral theologian.

== Biography ==
Diana was born of a noble family at Palermo, Sicily. A famous casuist, he was a consultor of the Holy Office of the Kingdom of Sicily and an examiner of bishops under Urban VIII, Innocent X, and Alexander VII.

Harshly attacked in Blaise Pascal's Provincial Letters, notably for his famous legitimation of duels, Diana himself claimed that as a rule his solutions followed the milder opinion. On the frontispiece of his Resolutiones Morales round a figure of the Cross runs the legend Non ferro sed ligno. According to Saint Alphonsus, Diana went too far in the direction of laxity. He died at Rome in 1663.
