= Vincenzo Filliucci =

Italian theologian (1566–1622)

Vincenzo Filliucci SJ (Filiutius; Siena, 1566 – Rome, 5 April 1622) was an Italian Jesuit moralist. The Provincial Letters of Blaise Pascal, and Les Extraits des Assertions, make much out of their quotations from his writings.

== Life ==
Having entered the Society of Jesus at the age of eighteen and made the usual course in classics, science, philosophy, and theology, he professed philosophy and mathematics for some years, and later became rector of the Jesuit college in Siena. Being summoned to Rome to fill the chair in moral theology in the Roman College, he taught there for ten years with great distinction. Pope Paul V appointed him penitentiary of St. Peter's, a post he filled until his death in the following pontificate.

== Works ==
Fillucci's major work, Moralium Quæstionum de Christianis Officiis et Causibus Conscientiæ Tomi Duo, appeared in 1622, together with a posthumous Appendix, de Statu Clericorum, forming a third volume. It was frequently reprinted, in several counties of Europe.

A Synopsis Theologiæ Moralis, which likewise appeared posthumously in 1626, went through numerous editions. Fillucci is also known for his Brevis Instructio pro Confessionibus Excipiendis (Ravensburg, 1626); this work is generally published as an appendix in all subsequent editions of his "Synopsis." Besides these published works, there is a manuscript, Tractis de Censuris, preserved in the archives of the Roman College.

As an authority in moral theology, Fillucci has ever been accorded high rank, though this did not save him from the attacks of the Jansenists; while, in the anti-Jesuit tumult of 1762, the parlement of Bordeaux forbade his works, and the parlement of Rouen burnt them, together with twenty-eight other works by Jesuit authors.
