= Pope Innocent XI =

Head of the Catholic Church from 1676 to 1689

Pope Blessed Innocent XI
- Bishop of Rome
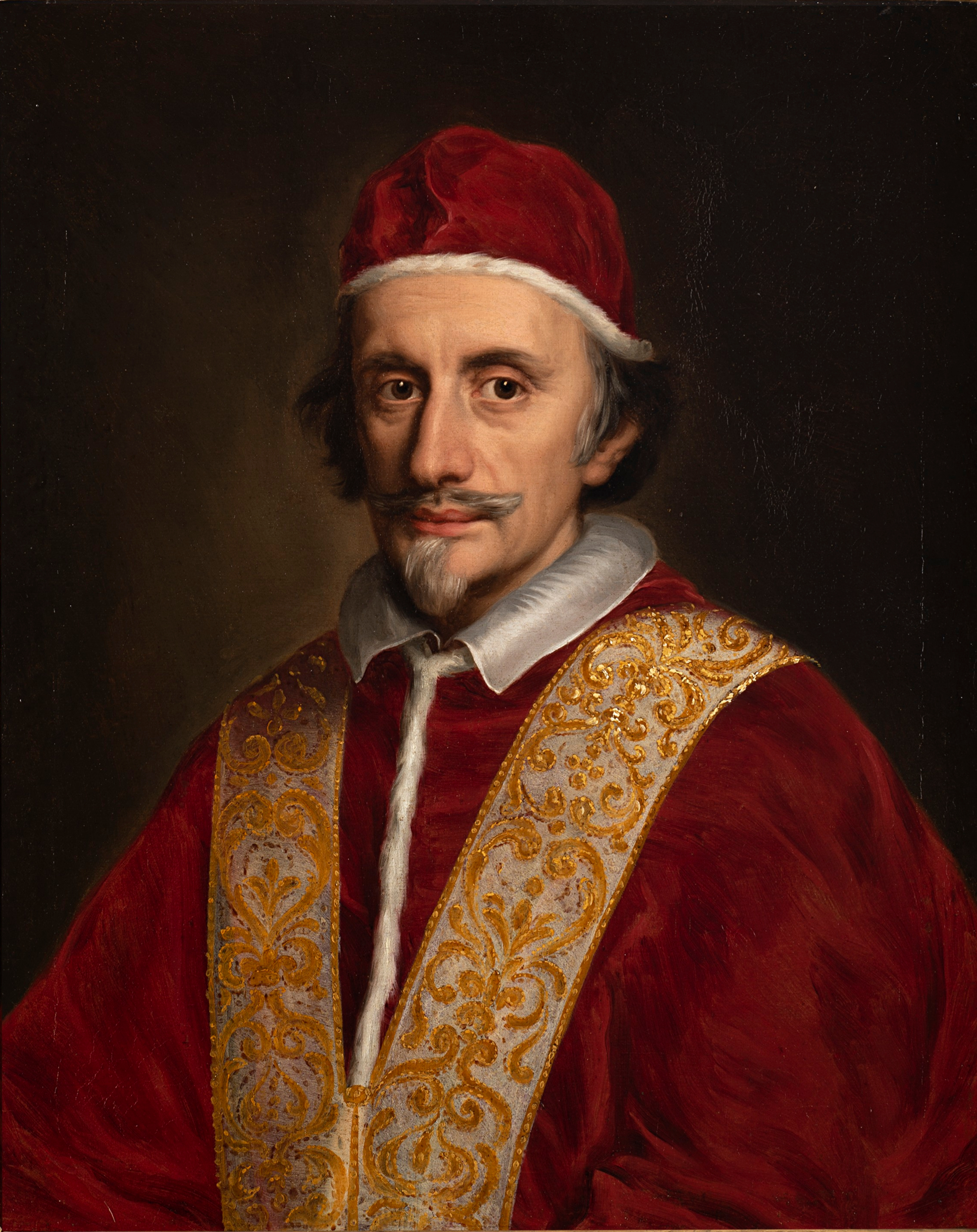
- Portrait by Jacob Ferdinand Voet, 1670s
- Church: Catholic Church
- Papacy began: 21 September 1676
- Papacy ended: 12 August 1689
- Predecessor: Clement X
- Successor: Alexander VIII
- Previous posts: Referendary of the Apostolic Signatura (1642–1645); Governor of Macerata (1644–1645); Prefect of the Apostolic Signatura (1647–1650); Legate of Ferrara (1648–1651); Bishop of Novara (1650–1656); Camerlengo of the Sacred College of Cardinals (1660–1661); Cardinal-Deacon of Santi Cosma e Damiano (1645–1659); Cardinal-Priest of Sant'Onofrio (1659–1676)

Orders
- Ordination: 20 November 1650 by Francesco Maria Macchiavelli
- Consecration: 29 January 1651 by Francesco Maria Macchiavelli
- Created cardinal: 6 March 1645 by Innocent X

Personal details
- Born: Benedetto Odescalchi; 16 May 1611 Como, Duchy of Milan
- Died: 12 August 1689 (aged 78) Rome, Papal States
- Motto: Avarus non implebitur ("The covetous man is not (never) satisfied [with money]")

- Coat of arms

Sainthood
- Feast day: 12 August; 13 August (Hungary)
- Venerated in: Catholic Church
- Title as Saint: Blessed
- Beatified: 7 October 1956; Saint Peter's Basilica, Vatican City by Pope Pius XII
- Attributes: Papal vestments; Camauro; Papal tiara
- Patronage: Diocese of Novara; Diocese of Como Bavarian Congregation

Pope Innocent XI (Latin: Innocentius XI; Italian: Innocenzo XI; 16 May 1611 – 12 August 1689), born Benedetto Odescalchi, was head of the Catholic Church and ruler of the Papal States from 21 September 1676 until his death on 12 August 1689.

Political and religious tensions with Louis XIV of France were a constant preoccupation for Innocent XI. Within the Papal States, he lowered taxes, produced a surplus in the papal budget and repudiated nepotism within the Church. Innocent XI was frugal in his governance of the Papal States, his methods evident in matters ranging from his manner of dress to a wide range of standards of personal behaviour consistent with his conception of Christian values. Once he was elected to the papacy, he applied himself to moral and administrative reform of the Roman Curia. He abolished sinecures and pushed for greater simplicity in preaching as well as greater reverence in worship, requesting this of both the clergy and faithful. In consideration of his diplomatic and financial support for efforts to free Hungary from Turkish domination, he is still widely referred to in the country as the "Saviour of Hungary".

After a difficult cause for canonization, starting in 1791, which caused considerable controversy over the years and which was stopped on several occasions, he was beatified in 1956 by Pope Pius XII.

== Early life ==
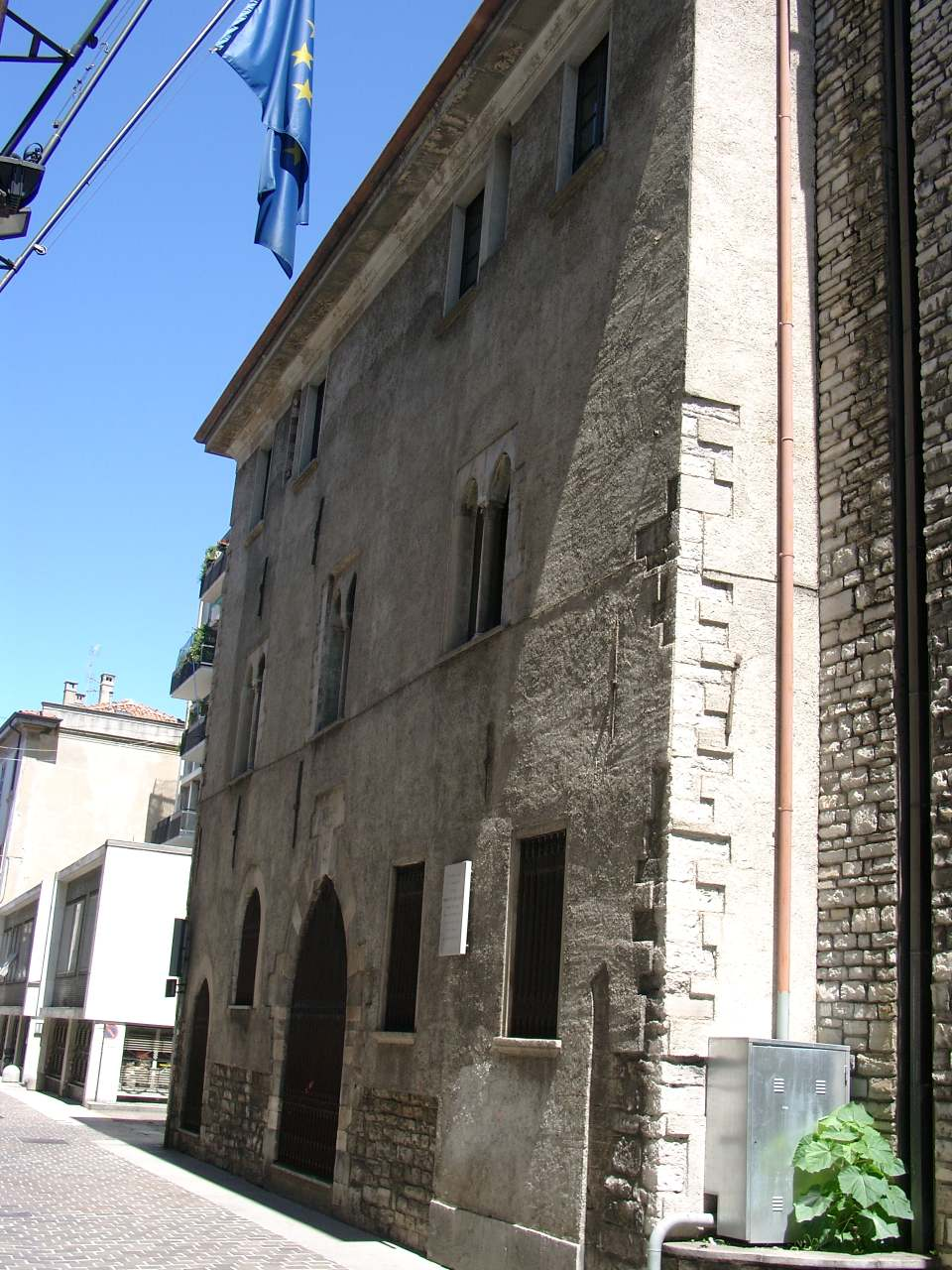
The birthplace of Pope Innocent XI at Como

Benedetto Odescalchi was born in Como on 16 May 1611, the son of a nobleman of Como, Livio Odescalchi, who died in 1626, and his wife Paola Castelli-Giovanelli from Gandino, who died of the plague in 1630. The child's siblings were Carlo Odescalchi (1609 - 1673), married to Beatrice Cusani of the Marquesses of Chignolo (parents of Giovanna Odescalchi (1651 - 14 July 1679), married in Milan on 27 May 1677 as his first wife to Carlo Borromeo-Arese, 6th Marquess of Angera, 11th Count of Arona, with issue), Lucrezia Odescalchi (9 October 1605 - ?), married on 4 February 1621 to Alessandro Erba (6 November 1599 - 31 August 1670), son of Gerolamo Erba and wife Vittoria Olgiati, ancestors of the Erba-Odescalchi, Giulio Maria Odescalchi, Costantino Odescalchi, Nicola Odescalchi and Paolo Odescalchi. He also had several collateral descendants of note through his sister: her grandson Cardinal Benedetto Erba Odescalchi and Cardinal Carlo Odescalchi - Servant of God.

The Odescalchi, a family of minor nobility, were determined entrepreneurs. In 1619, Benedetto's brother founded in Genoa with his three uncles a bank which quickly grew into a successful money-lending business. After completing his studies in grammar and letters, the 15-year-old Benedetto moved to Genoa to take part in the family business as an apprentice. Lucrative economic transactions were established with clients in the major Italian and European cities, such as Nuremberg, Milan, Kraków, and Rome.

In 1626, Benedetto's father died, and he began schooling in the humanities taught by the Jesuits at his local college, before transferring to Genoa. In 1630, he narrowly survived an outbreak of plague, which killed his mother.

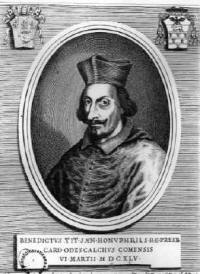
Cardinal Odescalchi

Some time between 1632 and 1636, Benedetto decided to move to Rome and then Naples to study civil law. This led to his securing the offices of protonotary apostolic, the president of the Apostolic Camera, commissary of the Marco di Roma, and governor of Macerata. On 6 March 1645, Pope Innocent X (1644–55) made him Cardinal-Deacon with the deaconry of Santi Cosma e Damiano. He subsequently became legate to Ferrara. When he was sent to Ferrara in order to assist the people stricken with a severe famine, the Pope introduced him to the people of Ferrara as the "father of the poor".

In 1650, Odescalchi became bishop of Novara in which capacity he spent all of the revenues of his see to relieve the poor and sick in his diocese. He participated in the 1655 conclave. In 1656, with the pope's permission, he resigned as Bishop of Novara in favour of his brother Giulio and moved to Rome. While there, he took a prominent part in the consultations of the various congregations of which he was a member. He participated in the 1669–70 conclave.

== Papacy ==
=== Election ===
Odescalchi was a strong papal candidate after the death of Clement IX (1667–69) in 1669, but the French government rejected him (using the now-abolished veto). After Pope Clement X (1670–76) died, Louis XIV of France (1643–1715) again intended to use his royal influence against Odescalchi's election. Instead, believing that the cardinals as well as the Roman people were of one mind in their desire to have Odescalchi as their Pope, Louis reluctantly instructed the French party cardinals to acquiesce in his candidacy.

On 21 September 1676, Odescalchi was chosen to be Clement X's successor and took the name of Innocent XI. He chose that name in honour of Innocent X, who made him a cardinal in 1645. He was formally crowned as pontiff on 4 October 1676 by the protodeacon, Cardinal Francesco Maidalchini.

Papal styles of Pope Innocent XI
- Reference style: His Holiness
- Spoken style: Your Holiness
- Religious style: Holy Father
- Posthumous style: Blessed

=== Reforming administration of papacy ===
Immediately upon his accession, Innocent XI turned all his efforts towards reducing the expenses of the Curia. He passed strict ordinances against nepotism among the cardinals. He lived frugally and exhorted the cardinals to do the same. In this manner, he ended the annual deficit, which at his accession had reached the sum of 170,000 scudi, and within a few years, the papal income was even in excess of the expenditures. He lost no time in declaring and practically manifesting his zeal as a reformer of manners and a corrector of administrative abuses. Beginning with the clergy, he sought to raise the laity also to a higher moral standard of living. He closed all of the theatres in Rome (considered to be centres of vice and immorality) and famously brought a temporary halt to the flourishing traditions of Roman opera.

In 1679, he publicly condemned sixty-five propositions, taken chiefly from the writings of Antonio Escobar y Mendoza, Francisco Suarez and other casuists (mostly Jesuit casuists, who had been heavily attacked by Pascal in his Provincial Letters) as propositiones laxorum moralistarum and forbade anyone to teach them under penalty of excommunication. He condemned in particular the most radical form of mental reservation (stricte mentalis) which authorised deception without an outright lie.

Personally not unfriendly to Miguel de Molinos, Innocent XI nevertheless yielded to the enormous pressure brought to bear upon him to confirm in 1687 the judgement of the inquisitors by which sixty-eight Quietist propositions of Molinos were condemned as blasphemous and heretical.

=== Jewish relations ===
Innocent XI showed a degree of sensitivity in his dealings with the Jews within the Italian states. He compelled the Republic of Venice to release the Jewish prisoners taken by Francesco Morosini in 1685. He also discouraged compulsory baptisms, which accordingly became less frequent under his pontificate, but he could not abolish the old practice altogether.

More controversially, on 30 October 1682, he issued an edict by which all the money-lending activities carried out by the Roman Jews were to cease. Such a move would incidentally have financially benefited his own brothers, who played a dominant role in European money-lending. However, ultimately convinced that such a measure would cause much misery in destroying livelihoods, the enforcement of the edict was twice delayed.

== Foreign relations ==
=== Battle of Vienna ===
Innocent XI was an enthusiastic initiator of the Holy League, which brought together the states of the Holy Roman Empire and King John III Sobieski of Poland-Lithuania who in 1683 hastened to the relief of the Battle of Vienna, which was being besieged by the Turks. After the siege was raised, Innocent XI again spared no efforts to induce the Christian princes to lend a helping hand for the expulsion of the Turks from Ottoman Hungary. He contributed millions of scudi to the Turkish war fund in Austria and Hungary and had the satisfaction of hearing of the capture of Belgrade on 6 September 1688.

=== Pope-burning in London ===
During England's Exclusion Crisis (1679–1681), when Parliament sought to exclude the Catholic Duke of York from gaining the throne, the radical Protestants of London's Green Ribbon Club regularly held mass processions culminating with burning "The Pope" in effigy. Evidently, the organisers of these events were unaware that the actual Pope in Rome was involved in a deep conflict with the King of France and therefore was far from supporting the drive to get the Duke of York crowned, which would serve Louis XIV's political ambitions.

=== Relations with France ===
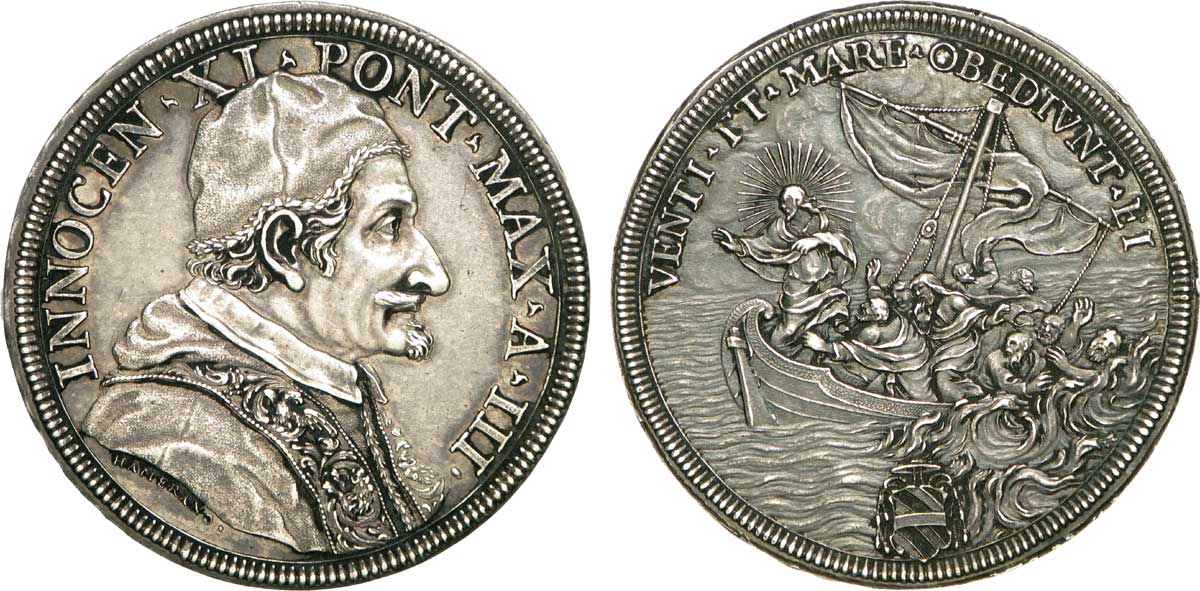
Coins of Innocent XI

The pontificate of Innocent XI was marked by the struggle between the absolutism and hegemonic intentions of Louis XIV, and the primacy of the Catholic Church. As early as 1673, Louis had, by his own power, extended the right of the régale over the provinces of Languedoc, Guyenne, Provence, and Dauphiné, where it had not been exercised.

All the efforts of Innocent XI to induce Louis XIV to respect the rights and primacy of the Church proved useless. In 1682, the King convoked an assembly of the French clergy, which adopted the four articles that became known as the Gallican Liberties. Innocent XI annulled the four articles on 11 April 1682 and refused his approbation to all future episcopal candidates who had taken part in the assembly.

To appease the Pope, Louis XIV began to act as a zealot of Catholicism. In 1685, he revoked the Edict of Nantes and inaugurated a persecution of French Huguenots. Innocent expressed displeasure at those drastic measures and continued to withhold his approbation from the episcopal candidates.

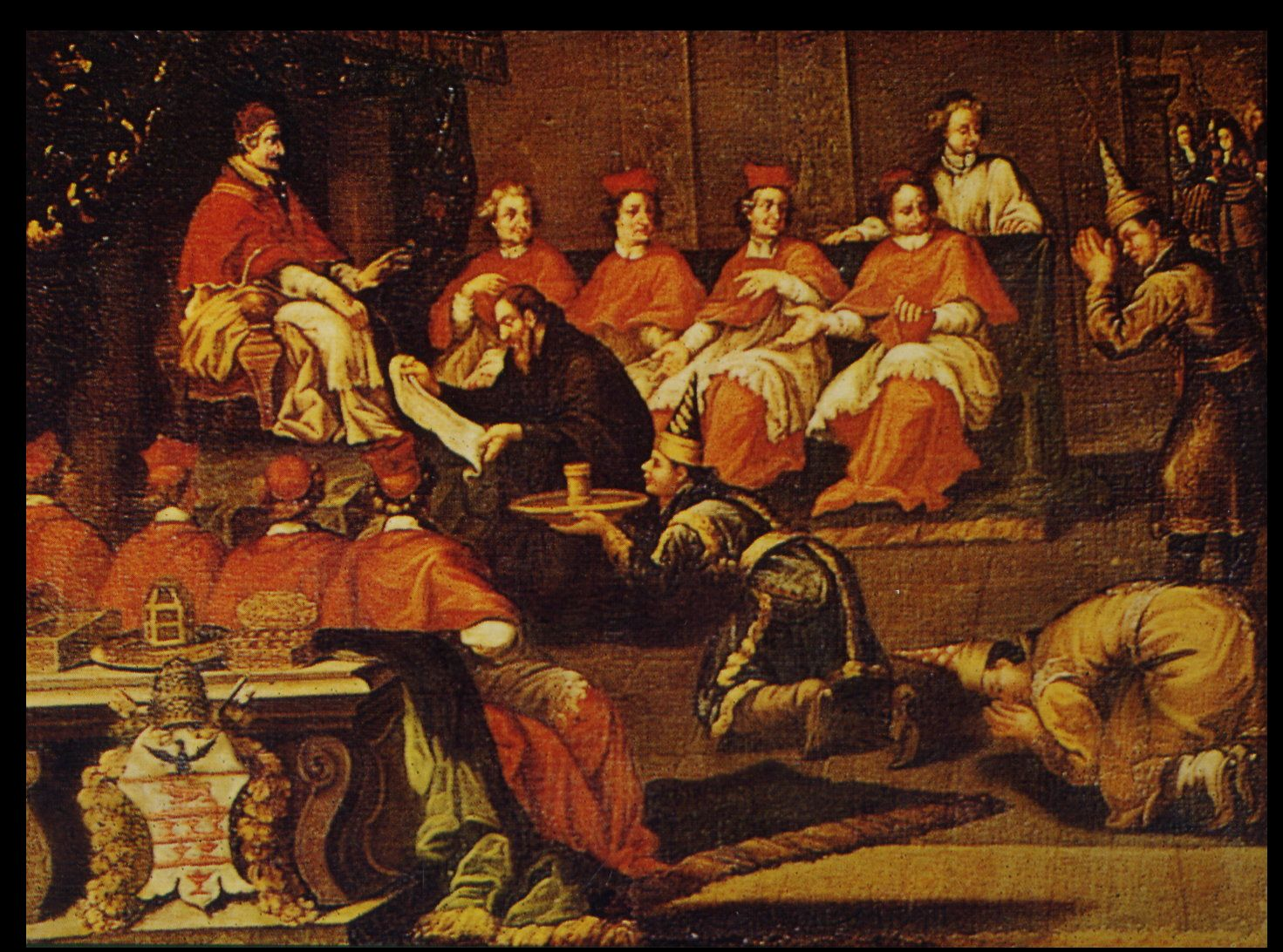
Tachard, with Siamese envoys, translating the letter of King Narai to Pope Innocent XI, December 1688

Innocent XI irritated the King still more that same year by abolishing the much-abused right of asylum by which foreign ambassadors in Rome had been able to harbour in embassies any criminal wanted by the papal court of justice. He notified the new French ambassador, Marquis de Lavardin, that he would not be recognised as ambassador in Rome unless he renounced this right, but Louis XIV would not give it up. At the head of an armed force of about 800 men, Lavardin entered Rome in November 1687 and took forcible possession of his palace. Innocent XI treated him as excommunicated and on 24 December 1687 placed under interdict the Church of St. Louis at Rome, where Lavardin attended services.

In January 1688, Innocent XI received the diplomatic mission which had been dispatched to France and the Holy See by Narai, the King of Siam, under Guy Tachard and Ok-khun Chamnan in order to establish relations.

=== Cologne ===
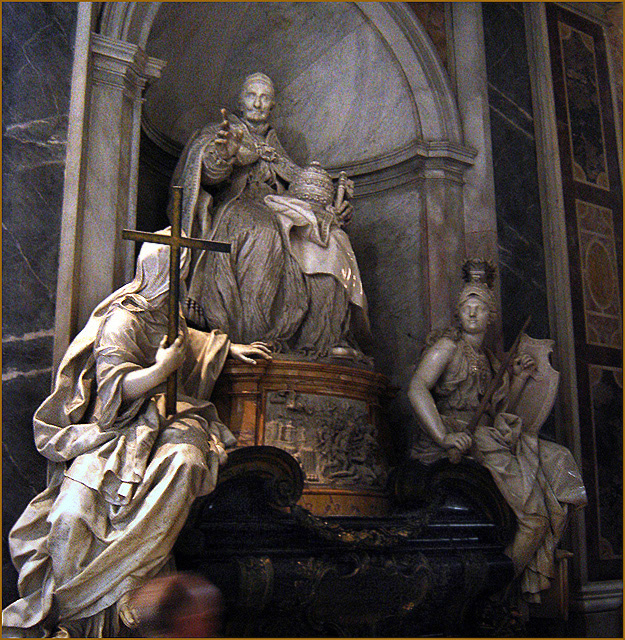
Monument to Pope Innocent XI, St. Peter's Basilica

The tension between the Pope and the King of France was increased by Innocent's procedure in filling the vacant archepiscopal see of Cologne. The two candidates for the see were Cardinal Wilhelm Egon von Fürstenberg, then Bishop of Strasbourg, and Joseph Clemens, a brother of Max Emanuel, Elector of Bavaria. The former was a willing tool in the hands of Louis XIV, and his appointment as Archbishop and Prince-elector of Cologne would have implied French preponderance in north-western Germany.

Joseph Clemens was the candidate of not only Emperor Leopold I (1658–1705) but also of all other European rulers, with the exception of the King of France and his supporter and cousin, King James II of England (1685–88). At the election, which took place on 19 July 1688, neither of the candidates received the required number of votes. The decision, therefore, fell to Innocent XI, who designated Joseph Clemens as Archbishop and Elector of Cologne.

Louis XIV retaliated by taking possession of the papal territory of Avignon, imprisoning the papal nuncio and appealing to a general council. He did not conceal his intention to separate the French Church entirely from Rome. The Pope remained firm. The subsequent fall of James II in England destroyed French preponderance in Europe, and soon after Innocent XI's death, the struggle between Louis XIV and the papacy was settled in favour of the Church.

=== Innocent XI and William of Orange ===
Innocent XI dispatched Ferdinando d'Adda as nuncio to the Kingdom of England, the first representative of the Papacy to go to England for over a century. Even so, the Pope did not approve the imprudent manner in which James II attempted to restore Catholicism in England. He also repeatedly expressed his displeasure at the support which James II gave to the autocratic King Louis XIV in his measures against the Church. It is not surprising, therefore, that Innocent XI had less sympathy for James than for William of Orange and that he did not afford James help in his hour of trial. Innocent refused to appoint James II's choice as a Cardinal, Sir Edward Petre, 3rd Baronet.

== Moral theology ==
Innocent XI issued the papal bull Sanctissimus Dominus in 1679 to condemn 65 propositions that favoured a liberal approach to doctrine, which included two that related to abortion. He first condemned Proposition 34 and countered that it was unlawful to procure an abortion. He also condemned Proposition 35, which stated, "It seems probable that the fetus (as long as it is in the uterus) lacks a rational soul and begins first to have one when it is born; and consequently it must be said that no abortion is a homicide."

== Other activities ==
Innocent XI was no less intent on preserving the purity of faith and morals among all people. He insisted on thorough education and an exemplary lifestyle for all people, and he passed strict rules in relation to the modesty of dress among Roman women. Furthermore, he put an end to the ever-increasing passion for gambling by suppressing the gambling houses in Rome. By a decree of 12 February 1679 he encouraged frequent and even daily reception of Holy Communion. On 4 March 1679, he condemned the proposition that "the precept of keeping Holy Days is not obligatory under pain of mortal sin, aside from scandal, if contempt is absent". In 1688, he reiterated a decree of Sixtus V that banned women from singing on stage in all public theatres or opera houses.

Innocent XI was hostile towards the book Varia Opuscula Theologica (Various Theological Brochures) that the Spanish Jesuit Francisco Suárez published. He ordered all copies to be burnt in 1679, but his orders were ignored. One of the books was discovered in 2015.

=== Consistories ===
He elevated 43 new cardinals into the cardinalate in two consistories. In 1681, he named Antonio Pignatelli a cardinal, who would later become Innocent XII (taking his name in honour of the pope who elevated him). Innocent XI also intended to nominate his confessor Ludovico Marracci as a cardinal, but he declined the invitation.

=== Beatifications and canonizations ===
He also canonized two saints: Bernard of Menthon in 1681 and Pedro Armengol on 8 April 1687. He beatified six individuals.

== Death and beatification ==
=== Final days and death ===
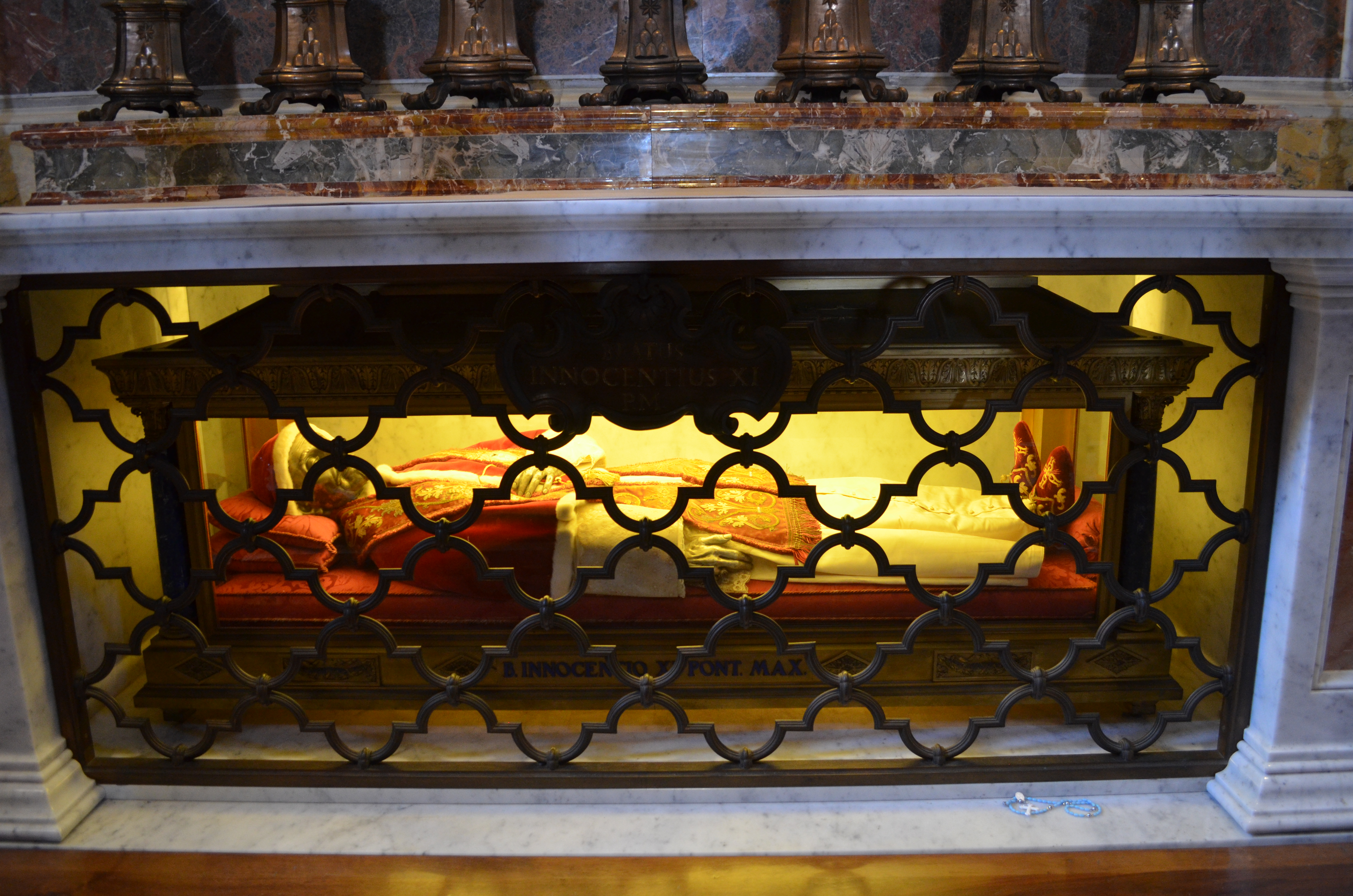
The body of Innocent XI in St Peter's Basilica

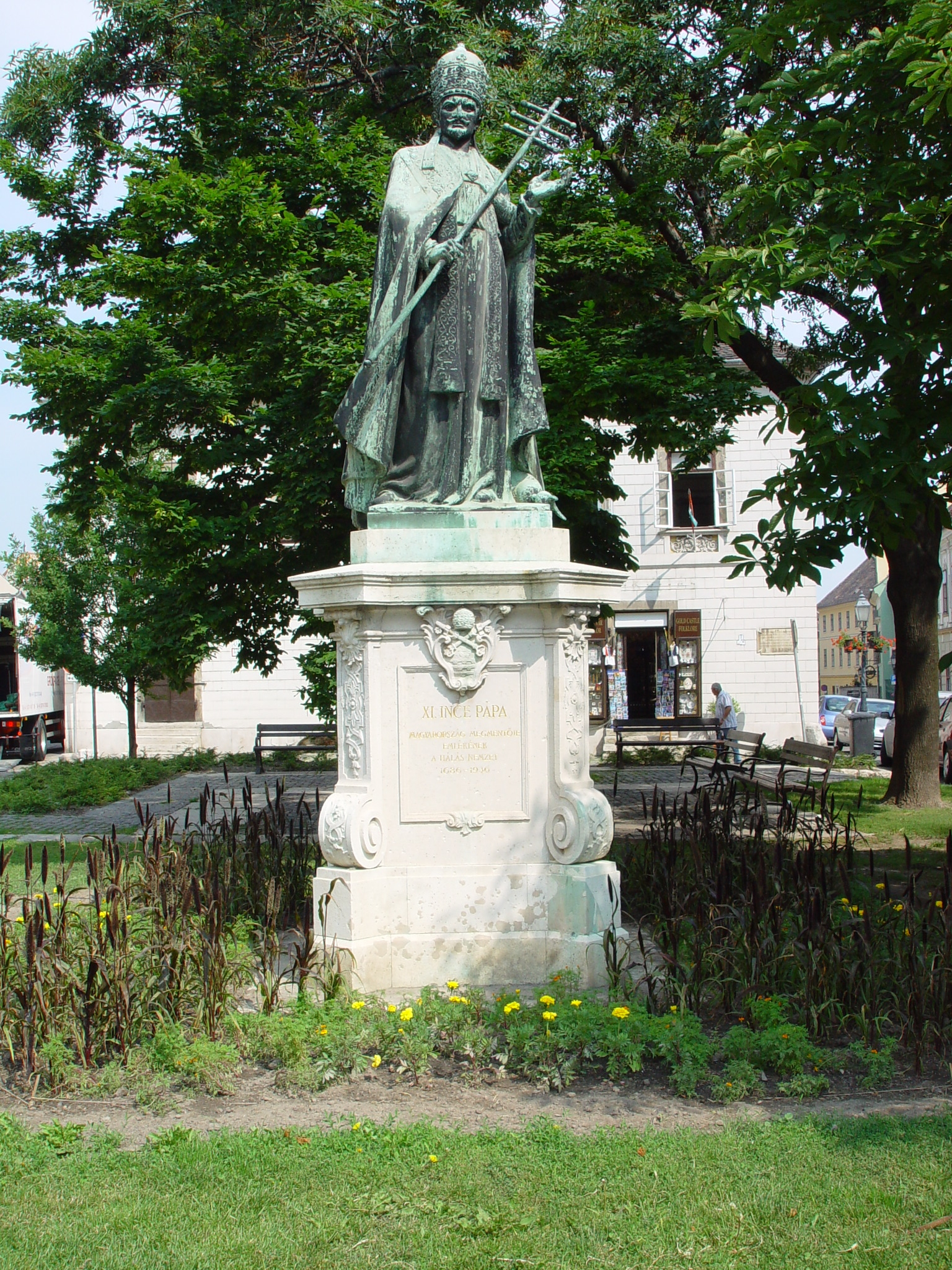
Statue of Innocent XI in Budapest

Innocent XI is known to have suffered from kidney stones since 1682, and in 1689, his health declined notably. In June that year, he was confined to his bed. For reasons of ill health, he cancelled a consistory of cardinals convoked for 19 June for the examination of bishops, and he also cancelled meetings on 21 June. The pope was suddenly assailed by a strong fever on 25 June, and on 29 June, he was unable to celebrate the solemn Mass for the Feast of Saints Peter and Paul, deputing Cardinal Flavio Chigi to celebrate it in his place. The Pope's condition worsened on 2 July, and his doctors were led to lance his left leg, which caused fluid release, and eventually to undertake an operation on his right leg on 31 July, and two more in the following two days.

On 9 August, he received the Viaticum since doctors were of the opinion that he had little time left to live. On 11 August, he received in audience Cardinal Leandro Colloredo, who came to remind him that the pope had been set to raise ten men to the cardinalate, but the pope refused to do so despite the cardinal's insistence. On the morning of 12 August, he lost the ability to speak and suffered from breathing difficulties.

Innocent XI died on 12 August 1689 at 22:00 (Rome time). Following his death, he was buried in St Peter's Basilica beneath his funeral monument near the Clementine Chapel, which his nephew, Prince Livio Odescalchi, commissioned. The monument, which was designed and sculpted by Pierre-Étienne Monnot, features the pope seated upon the throne above a sarcophagus with a base-relief showing the liberation of Vienna from the Turks by John III Sobieski, flanked by two allegorical figures representing Faith and Fortitude.

In April 2011, the remains of Innocent XI were moved to make way for the remains of the beatified John Paul II.

=== Beatification ===
Blessed Innocent XI
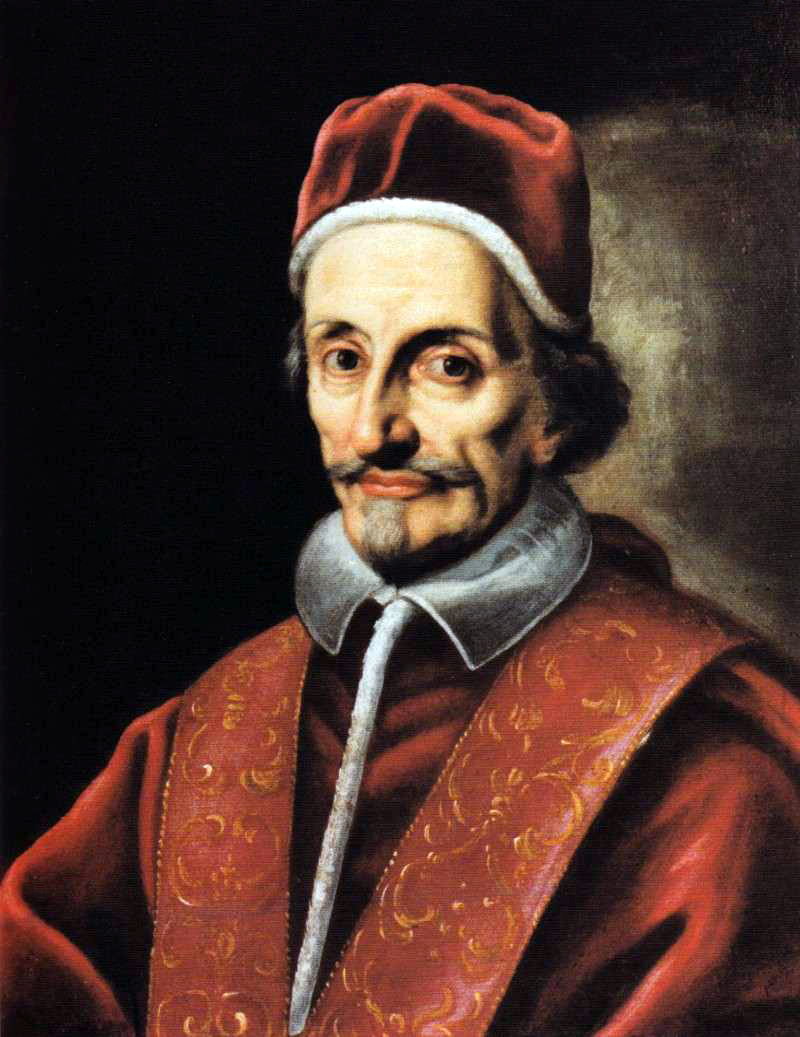
- 1787 portrait

Pope; Confessor
- Born: Benedetto Odescalchi; 16 May 1611; Como, Lombardy, Duchy of Milan
- Died: 12 August 1689 (aged 78); Apostolic Palace, Rome, Papal States
- Venerated in: Catholic Church
- Beatified: 7 October 1956, Saint Peter's Basilica, Vatican City by Pope Pius XII
- Feast: 12 August; 13 August (Hungary)
- Attributes: Papal attire Papal tiara Camauro
- Patronage: Diocese of Novara; Diocese of Como; Bavarian Congregation

The process of Innocent XI's beatification was introduced in 1691 by Pope Innocent XII. His cause was formally opened on 23 June 1714 under Clement XI, granting him the title of Servant of God, and continued under Clement XII, but French influence and the accusation of Jansenism caused it to be suspended in 1744 by Pope Benedict XIV. In the 20th century, it was reintroduced; his writings were approved by theologians on 24 March 1945, and Pope Pius XII proclaimed him venerable on 15 November 1955 and blessed on 7 October 1956.

Following his beatification, his sarcophagus was placed under the Altar of St. Sebastian in the basilica's Chapel of St. Sebastian, where it remained until 8 April 2011 when it was moved to make way for the remains of Pope John Paul II to be relocated to the basilica from the grotto beneath St. Peter's in honor of his beatification and in order to make his resting place more accessible to the public. Innocent's body was transferred to the basilica's Altar of Transfiguration, which is located near the Clementine Chapel and the entombed remains of Pope Gregory the Great (590–604). The altar is also across from Innocent XI's monument, which was his original site of burial before his beatification.

The feast day assigned to Innocent XI is 12 August, the date of his death. In the Hungarian calendar, it is commemorated on August 13.

== Encyclicals ==
- Sollicitudo pastoralis (Fostering and Preserving the Orders of Men Religious)
- Coelestis Pastor (Condemning the errors of Molinos)

== See also ==
- Cardinals created by Innocent XI
- Odescalchi
- Taxa Innocentiana

== Sources ==
- Kelly, J.N.D. (1986). The Oxford History of the Popes. Oxford University Press. ISBN 978-0-19-282085-3.
- Michaud, Eugène (1882). Louis XIV et Innocent XI (in French). Vol. Tome Premier: Innocent XI et son cour. Paris: Charpentier.

=== Acknowledgment ===
Catholic Church titles
Preceded by Clement X	Pope; 21 September 1676 – 12 August 1689	Succeeded by Alexander VIII
