= Étienne Bauny =

French Jesuit theologian

Étienne Bauny (1564, Mouzon, Ardennes, France – 3 December 1649, Saint Pol de Léon) was a French Jesuit theologian.

== Life ==
Bauny was admitted into the Society of Jesus, 20 July 1593. After teaching humanities and rhetoric, he was promoted to the chair of moral theology which he occupied for sixteen years. He was for a time superior of the Jesuit residence at Pontoise. He had the confidence of the most distinguished prelates of his age, especially of François de La Rochefoucauld, who chose him as his spiritual director, and of René de Rieux, Bishop of Léon, who entrusted to him the settlement of the most delicate affairs of his episcopate.

Many of Bauny's Jansenist contemporaries criticized him as too lenient. Blaise Pascal cited Bauny as an example of lax Jesuit morality in his Provincial Letters, and Antoine Arnauld voiced similar accusations. His opinions on Catholic probabilism were critiqued by contemporary Franciscan theologian Bernardino Ciaffoni.

He died in the odour of sanctity, almost in the very exercise of his apostolic ministry, at the age of eighty-five.

== Works ==
Bauny's published works are:

- Constitutiones Synodales dioecesis Leonensis, a Renato de Rieux Episcopo Leonensi promulgatae Paulipoli in Leoniâ (Paris, 1630)
- Pratique du droit canonique au gouvernement de l'Eglise, correction des moeurs, et distribution des bénéfices, le tout au style et usage de France (Paris, 1634)
- De Sacramentis ac Personis Sacris, earumque dignitate, obligationibus ac jure, juxta sacrarum litterarum testimonia, SS. Patrum sententias Canonum ac Conciliorum sanctiones, cum summariis, indice duplice, uno tractatuum et quaestionum, rerum altero. Theologiae moralis pars prima (Paris, 1640) in fol.
- Tractatus de censuris ecclesiasticis (Paris, 1642), in fol.
- Nova beneficiorum praxisæ (Paris, 1649

But his Pratique du droi and De Sacramentis were placed on the index of forbidden books.
