= Gabriel Vásquez =

Spanish theologian

The Reverend Gabriel Vázquez SJ
- Portrait of Gabriel Vásquez
- Born: 1549; Villaescusa de Haro, Crown of Castile
- Died: 23 September 1604 (aged 54–55); Alcalá de Henares, Crown of Castile

Education
- Education: University of Alcalá

Philosophical work
- Era: Early modern philosophy; Renaissance philosophy
- Region: Western philosophy; Spanish philosophy
- School: Scholasticism; Medieval realism School of Salamanca
- Notable students: Matthew Kellison
- Main interests: Theology, metaphysics, philosophy of law

Gabriel Vásquez SJ (1549 or 1551 – 23 September 1604), known as Bellomontanus, was a Spanish theologian, Jesuit priest, and scholastic philosopher. Vásquez was the foremost academic rival of his fellow Jesuit Francisco Suárez, whose philosophical views he often and openly criticized. Suárez's treatment of the jus gentium, like his treatment of natural law, was partly directed at combatting the arguments of Vásquez.

Vásquez established a School, and the disputes between his disciples and those of the Dominican John of St. Thomas concerning the Divine knowledge and the Divine idea were famous at the time. Luis de Torres and Diego de Alarcón were the most notable disciples of the School, and, although it was short-lived, modern theologians frequently quote him.

== Life and career ==
=== Youth and studies in Alcalá ===
Gabriel Vásquez was born in the Spanish town of Villaescusa de Haro, part of the larger town of Belmonte, which latter some historians give as his birth place. The exact date of his birth is doubtful; some give it as 1549, others as 1551, the former being the more generally accepted.

He attended primary school in Belmonte, then the Jesuit college in the same town before going on to the University of Alcalá. The University of Alcalá, founded in 1498 by Cardinal Ximenes and famed for its polyglot edition of the Sacred Scriptures, while even more keenly alive than Salamanca to the New Learning, contended with its rival in the pursuit of Scholasticism, a Scholasticism not ignorant of the precious value and right use of the Humanities. In the University Vásquez was a 'collegiate student of Arts', a position obtained through competition and strict examination. There following his father's profession he took up the study of law, but feeling more inclined to philosophy, he abandoned the first for the second.

In his fourth year of philosophy, wherein he had the famed Domingo Báñez as professor, he entered the Society of Jesus (9 April 1569). After his novitiate carried out in Alcalá, Toledo and Sigüenza, he went on to the study of Theology in Alcalá. He took some of his theological courses in the Jesuit college of the University, others in the University itself where he attended the lectures of the renowned Alonso Deza, the holder of the Chair of Prime in the University. In his fourth year he made a public defence in Theology, first at Alcalá, and then in Toledo, 2 October 1572. During this same period he pursued a course in Hebrew at the university and acquired great competence in its use.

We learn from his commentaries that in 1572, his second year of Theology, he gave lectures to his Jesuit confrères on the De Anima of Aristotle. His theological studies completed he began to teach moral theology at the college of Ocaña. Two years later he undertook to lecture in scholastic theology in Madrid. At the close of his second year, he returned to teach theology at Alcalá.

=== Academic career ===
On 30 July 1585, Claudio Acquaviva, then general of the Jesuits, summoned him to Rome to replace Francisco Suárez as professor of Theology in the Roman College, now the Gregorian University. Before his departure he made his profession at Belmonte. Vásquez taught there with such success that upon his departure for Spain in 1591 his students raised the cry, 'Si Vásquez abit, tota schola perit - If Vásquez goes, the whole school goes.' Back in Alcalá he began on the advice of Aquaviva to prepare his works for publication. Upon the retirement of Suárez in Alcalá he resumed the teaching of theology there. He continued in this task until his untimely death 30 September 1604.

Vásquez did not, however, spend all his time in teaching and writing. He lent his aid, his time and his talents to other projects. He was, with Suárez and Blas Diego, a member of the commission set up by the Provincial Congregation of Toledo held at the College of Alcalá in 1593 to evaluate the theological and philosophical sections of the Ratio Studiorum of 1586. We learn from a letter of Luis de Molina to Acquaviva that Vásquez was a member of the commission set up to examine the Spanish Index of Prohibited Books and to indicate the necessary emendations. While recognized to be a close observer of the controversy on Grace, known as the 'De Auxilius' debate, he did not take any official part in it. His opinions on Catholic probabilism were critiqued by contemporary Franciscan theologian Bernardino Ciaffoni. Vásquez opposed to the congruism of Suárez and Bellarmine a strictly Molinist position. Hernando Lucero, his religious superior, appointed him to intercede with the Dominican provincial, Thomas de Guzman, in a charge made against the De Mysteriis Vitae Christi of Francisco Suárez.

=== Legacy ===
Vásquez was highly regarded in his time as a learned theologian. In him, according to the 19th-century German Redemptorist writer Michael Haringer, virtue competed with doctrine, obedience with genius, and piety with learning. Nicolás Antonio called him vir acerrimo ingenio. The Duke of Lerma, favourite of Philip III of Spain, frequently consulted him in the most important matters, and Benedict XIV called him the luminary of theology.

The 1913 Catholic Encyclopedia describes Vásquez as "immensely influential", praising his clear writing and strict method. He drew on a detailed knowledge of Augustine of Hippo, Thomas Aquinas, and other Fathers of the Church. Vernon Bourke credits him as the probable source of Descartes's mind-body dualism and of Immanuel Kant's argument from morality.

== Theological thought ==
Vásquez argued for a number of opinions differing from the mainstream scholastic views. These included:

1. The natural law consists in rational nature considered in itself and in the recognition that certain actions are necessarily in accord with it and others are repugnant to it. Nevertheless, he does not deny that the natural law might also have cognizance of what the Divine law enjoins, and that it might, therefore, be the principle of a Divine obligation. In this he is in opposition to Kant, who holds that all the binding force of the moral law should come from man and from man alone.
2. The Divine ideas are not the essence of God, insofar as that essence or nature is known as imitable or to be imitated, but only as they are the knowledge, the word, the species expressa of possible and future creatures. These ideas thereby concur remotely in the creation of beings; their proximate principle being the Divine active potency by which God actually and effectually creates.
3. In the section dedicated to the discussion of the existence of God he cites the ontological proof of St. Anselm, the legitimateness and demonstrative value of which he appears to accept absolutely. Eternity is, according to him, duratio permanens, uniformis, sine principio et fine, mensura carens, a definition that differs somewhat from that adopted by Boethius and followed in the Schools.
4. Grace is necessary for performing all good actions and overcoming temptation. By grace he understands all good impulses which efficaciously urge to right action. It may proceed from natural causes, but as these are regulated by Divine Providence, if they are so regulated as to produce efficacious good impulses, it is grace, because man does not himself merit it, and to many it is denied. It is to be considered as a gift from God, since it is granted through the merits of Christ and for a supernatural end. Hence it is called grace.
5. Predestination, he maintains, is post praevisa merita, but children who die without its being in any way whatsoever possible for them to receive baptism were not, after original sin was foreseen, included in the salvific will of God.
6. In Christology he held the following opinions: that the Adoptionists are not Nestorians; that Christ cannot be called the servant of God; that Christ was under a command to die, but that He was free to choose the circumstances of his death; that the regular or formal dignity of the priesthood of Christ will last forever, because Christ is a priest according to His substance, and this remains immutable.
7. The ratio formalis of the Sacrifice of the Mass lies in the mystic separation of the Body and Blood of Christ effected by the words of consecration.
8. It is probable that in the new birth of baptism the guilt of sin is not pardoned ex opere operato, but only the punishment. Since the death of Christ, baptism is for children the only means of salvation; for them martyrdom has the virtue of justification instar baptism; but in adults it justifies only on account of the act of charity.
9. Episcopal consecration does not imprint a new character, nor does it in reality extend or increase the sacerdotal character; a new and distinct power is thereby conferred, which is nothing else than the Divine appointment to a new ministry.
10. In the Sacrament of Matrimony the bodies of the contracting parties constitute the matter, and their consent, expressed verbally or by signs, the form.
11. In treating the existence of God he notes the number of atheists who lived in his time, and attributes it to the influence of Protestantism. He also mentions the political atheists who consider God and religion only as governmental expedients to hold the people in check.

== Works ==
Vásquez's most important work is his commentary (Commentarii ac Disputationes) on the Summa Theologica of Thomas Aquinas (8 vols; 1598–1615), largely directed in its details against theses maintained by Suárez. His main works are:

- De cultu adorationis libri tres et disputationes duae contra errores Felicis et Elipandi, Alcalá, 1594; Mainz, 1601, 1604.
- Commentariorum ac Disputationum in (partes) S. Thomae, Alcalá, 8 vols., 1598–1615. Later abridged editions were published at Alcalá, Ingolstadt, Vienna, and more complete ones at Lyons in 1620 and Antwerp in 1621.
- Paraphrases et compendiaria explicatio ad nonnullas Pauli Epistolas, Alcalá, 1612; Ingolstadt, 1613; Lyons, 1630. Vives undertook to print all his works, but got only as far as the first volume (Paris, 1905).
- Disputationes metaphysicae desumptae ex variis locis suorum operum (Madrid, 1617; Antwerp, 1618) compiled by Francisco Murcia de la Llana, comprises the philosophical questions dispersed throughout his works, and is a rare and exceptionally valuable book.

Some of his manuscripts are preserved in the National Library of Madrid. His first volume on the first part of St. Thomas was held back two years by the censors of the Society. Among the questions he discussed are: An Deus extra coelum, vel in vacuo intra coelum esse possit, aut ante mundi creationem alicubi fuerit.

== Sources ==
- Nieremberg y Ottín, Juan Eusebio (1891). Varones ilustres de la Compañía de Jesús. Vol. VIII. Bilbao: Administracion del "Mensajero del corazon de Jesus". p. 355.
- Guilhermy, Elesban de (1902). Ménologe de la Compagnie de Jésus, Assistance d'Espagne. Vol. III. Paris: M.-R. Leroy. p. 111.
- Bacon, Nathaniel (1676). Bibliotheca Scriptorum Societatis Jesu. Rome: Ex Typographia Iacobi Antonij de Lazzaris Varesij. p. 271.
- González, Zeferino (1866). Historia de la Filosofía. Vol. III. Madrid: Agustín Jubera. p. 140.
- Menéndez y Pelayo, Marcelino (1884). Historia de las ideas estéticas en España. Vol. II. Madrid: Imprenta de A. Perez Dubrull. p. 207.
- Sommervogel, Carlos (1898). Bibliothèque de la Compagnie de Jésus. Vol. VIII. Brussels and Paris: O. Schepens–A. Picard. p. 513.
- Friedrich Stegmüller, ‘Zur Prädestinationslehre des jungen Vásquez’, in A. Lang et al. (eds), Aus der Geisteswelt des Mittelalters: Studien und Texte Martin Grabmann zur Vollendung des 60. Lebensjahres (BGPM, Supplementband 3 (1935), 2: 1287–311).
- Luciano Pereña Vicente, ed. (1956). "Importantes documentos inéditos de Gabriel Vázquez". Revista Española de Teología. 16: 193–213.
- Araud, Régis (1967). "Une étape dans l'histoire du traité de la conscience morale; le "traité de la conscience" chez G. Vasquez". Mélanges de Science Religieuse. 24: 3–48 and 113–52.
- Baldini, Ugo. 2004. "Ontology and Mechanics in Jesuit Scholasticism: The Case of Gabriel Vazquez." In Scientiae Et Artes. Die Vermittlung Alten Und Neuen Wissens in Literatur, Kunst Und Musik. Vol. I, edited by Mahlmann-Bauer, Barbara, 99-142. Wiesbaden: Harrassowitz.
- Isabelle Mandrella, ‘Gabriel Vázquez über das Naturrecht’, in K. Bunge, M. J. Fuchs, D. Simmermacher, and A. Spindler (eds), The Concept of Law (lex) in the Moral and Political Thought of the ‘School of Salamanca’ (Studies in Medieval and Reformation Traditions, 203; Leiden and Boston, 2016), 129–49.
