= Valère Regnault =

Valère Regnault or Regnauld (Latin: Valerius Reginaldus) (1545–1623) was a French Jesuit theologian.

== Life ==
He was born in the diocese of Besançon. He studied under Juan Maldonado at the Collège de Clermont, where he was one of the first pupils. He entered the Society of Jesus in 1573. He taught philosophy at the Collège de Bordeaux, then moral theology in several colleges.

== Works ==
- Praxis Fori Penitentialis
- Compendaria praxis difficiliorum casuum conscientiae
