= Louis Cellot =

Louis Cellot (Latinized as Cellotius, 1588 – 20 October 1658) was a French theologian and Jesuit writer.

== Biography ==
Cellot was born in Paris in 1588. He entered the Society of Jesus in Nancy in 1605. He was occupied in the study of Latin, Greek, and Hebrew, and initially taught these subjects. He served as rector of the colleges at Rouen, and then La Flèche, before becoming provincial of his order in France.

His work, Hierarchia, published in 1641, was censured by the Sorbonne University and placed in the Index of Prohibited Books by Rome. He was a dramatist and poet, as well as a theological writer. His opinions on Catholic probabilism were critiqued by contemporary Franciscan theologian Bernardino Ciaffoni.

He died in Paris in 1658.

== Works ==
- De Hierarchia et Hierarchis (Rouen, 1641)
- Horcem Subcisivce (Paris, 1648)
- Historia Gotteschalci (1655)
- Concilium Duziacense (1658)
