= Paul Laymann =

Austrian Jesuit and moralist

Paul Laymann (1574 – 13 November 1635 or 1632 ) was an Austrian Jesuit and moralist.

== Biography ==
Laymann was born at Arzl, near Innsbruck. After studying jurisprudence at Ingolstadt, he entered the Society of Jesus there in 1594, was ordained priest in 1603, taught philosophy at the University of Ingolstadt from 1603-9, moral theology at the Jesuit house in Munich from 1609–25, and Canon law at the University of Dillingen from 1625-32. He died of the plague at Konstanz.

== Works ==
Laymann was one of the greatest moralists and canonists of his time, and a copious writer on philosophical, moral, and juridical subjects. The most important of his thirty-three literary productions is a compendium of moral theology, Theologia Moralis in quinque libros partita (Munich, 1625), of which a second and enlarged edition in six volumes appeared in 1626 at the same place. Until the second quarter of the eighteenth century it was edited repeatedly (latest edition, Mainz, 1723), and was extensively used as a textbook in Catholic seminaries.

Especially in the third edition of his Theologia Moralis, Laymann stands up resolutely for a milder treatment of those who had been accused of witchcraft. The reason why Laymann is often represented as an advocate of the horrible cruelties practised at trials for witchcraft lies in the assumption that he is the author of a book entitled Processus juridicus contra sagas et veneficos (Cologne, 1629). Quite in contrast with Laymann's Theologia Moralis, this book is a defence of the extreme severity at trials for witchcraft. Bernhard Duhr has proved that Laymann is not the author of this work. See Zeitschrift für katholische Theologie, XXIII (Innsbruck, 1899), 733-43; XXIV (1900), 585-92; XXV (1901), 166-8; XXIX (1905), 190-2.

At the instance of Bishop Heinrich von Knöringen of Augsburg, Laymann wrote Pacis compositio inter Principes et Ordines Imperii Romani Catholicos atque Augustanæ Confessionis adhærentes (Dillingen, 1629), an elaborate work of 658 pages, explaining the value and extent of the Religious Peace of Augsburg, effected by King Ferdinand I in 1555. Another important work of Laymann is Justa defensio Sanctissimi Romani Pontificis, augustissimi Cæsaris, S.R.E. Cardinalium, episcoporum principum et aliorum, demum minimæ Societatis Jesu, in causa monasteriorum extinctorum et bonorum ecclesiasticorum vacantium . . . (Dillingen, 1631). It treats of the Edict of Restitution, issued by Ferdinand II in 1629, and sustains the point that in case of the ancient orders the property of suppressed monasteries need not be restored to the order to which these monasteries belonged, because each monastery was a corporation of its own. Such property, therefore, may be applied to Catholic schools and other ecclesiastical foundations. In the case of the Jesuit Order, however, he holds that all confiscated property must he restored to the order as such, because the whole Jesuit Order forms only one corporation.

His work on canon law, Jus Canonicum seu Commentaria in libros decretales (3 vols., Dillingen, 1666–98), was published after his death.
