= Catholic moral theology =

Major category of doctrine in the Catholic Church, equivalent to a religious ethics

Catholic moral theology is a major category of doctrine in the Catholic Church, equivalent to a religious ethics. Moral theology encompasses Catholic social teaching, Catholic medical ethics, sexual ethics, and various doctrines on individual moral virtue and moral theory. It can be distinguished as dealing with "how one is to act", in contrast to dogmatic theology which proposes "what one is to believe".

== Overview ==
Sources of Catholic moral theology include both the Old Testament and the New Testament, and philosophical ethics such as natural law that are seen as compatible with Catholic doctrine. Moral theology was mostly undifferentiated from theology in general during the patristic era, and is found in the homilies, letters and commentaries on Scripture of the early Church fathers.

Examples of Catholic moral theologians include St. Alphonsus Liguori (author of Theologia Moralis), Bartolomé Medina (originator of Probabilism), Dominic Prümmer (Compensationism), Bernhard Häring (Dialogical Ethics), Servais Pinckaers (Nouvelle théologie), Germain Grisez and John Finnis (New Natural Law).

Moral theology tends to be advanced most authoritatively through official statements of doctrine, such as papal encyclicals, which are based on the dogmatic pronouncements of Ecumenical Councils (e.g., Vatican II), Sacred Scriptures, and Sacred Tradition. In addition, moral theologians publish their own works and write in a variety of journals devoted in whole, or in part to moral theology. These scholarly journals are helpful in making the theology of the Church more clear and accessible to others, and serve as a forum in which scholarly discussion of understanding and application of issues occurs. However, these journals per se do not add or remove anything from Catholic teaching.

The curriculum for formation of priests commonly includes required and elective courses in Catholic moral theology.

== History ==
=== Middle Ages ===
During the Middle Ages, moral theology developed in precision and scope through scholasticism. Much of the Catholic Church's current moral theology, especially regarding natural law, is based in the Summa Theologica by St. Thomas Aquinas, which is regarded as one of the best treatises of Catholic moral theology.

=== Baroque period and Reformation ===
Although many theologians found inspiration in Aquinas from his death onwards, moral theology did not become its own separate field of scholarship until after the council of Trent at the dawn of the baroque period and the reformation, one of the wishes of the council fathers was to set out the more rigorous training of priests which would lead to the genesis of seminaries. Through the renewal of learning in the Church specialisation would begin to take root in the curriculum, with theology becoming fragmented into different 'fields' such as dogmatic, moral, spiritual theology and so on. This would lead to the birth of the genre of the 'Manual'.

=== Birth of manualism ===
Manualism designates an approach to Christian ethics, especially in Catholic moral theology, associated with Alphonsus Liguori and the tradition of "moral manuals" (instruction manuals teaching explicitly right and wrong) which came from him.

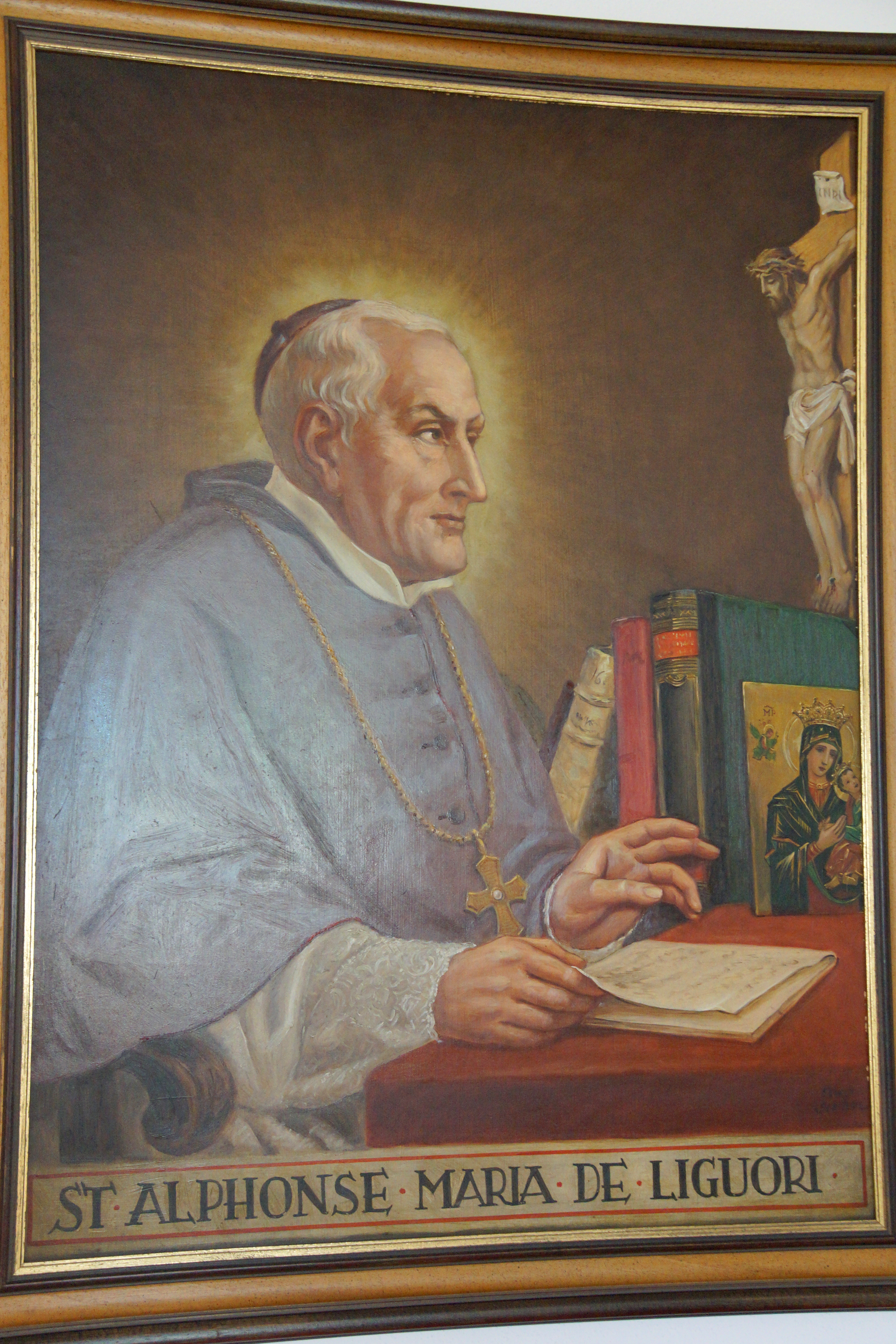
Alphonsus Liguori

The manualist tradition has an ambivalent relationship with scholasticism. David Bentley Hart among others state that much of contemporary Thomism has more manualism than Aquinas himself.

The manualist tradition is related to casuistry – Reasoning by extrapolation.

Manualism is associated with the theology surrounding artificial birth control.

The first manual of moral theology was written by the Jesuit, Juan Azor in three volumes, his Institutionum Moralium published in the 17th century. Although claiming patrimony to Aquinas, nominalism was most prolific at the time among the intellectual elite which seems to have influenced Azor's outlook in his work, instead of focusing on the beatitudes and virtues in the moral life as Aquinas in his Summa, nominalism emphasises the obligatory and legal nature of God's commands as a result of the arbitrary will of God and a person's conscience before the law, many would follow Azor's model with few modifications and this outlook would influence the whole manualist tradition of moral theology which would become less dominant after Vatican II, during this period it became more common for alternative approaches or attempts to return to a biblical, patristic or scholastic approach before the influence of nominalism and outgrowth of casuistry which was characteristic of the tridentine period.

=== Contemporary ===
Contemporary Catholic moral theology is developed by acts of the Magisterium, by the Pope, other bishops, and by the works of lay Catholic moral theologians, which include magisterial teachings, as well as (in some matters) theological opinions.

== Approaches ==
- In a deontological approach, morality takes the form of a studying of "how one is to act" in relation to the laws established by the faith. See also Casuistry.
- In a teleological approach, "how one is to act" is related to the ultimate end which is again established by the faith. See also Virtue Ethics
- In a dialogical approach, morality follows the pattern of faith directly, the "how one is to act" is related to an encounter with God through faith. Moral living is response to the Logos or Word of God. "Faith in the Logos...understands moral values as responsibility, as a response to the Word, and thus gives them their intelligibility as well as their essential orientation."

== See also ==
- Catholic teachings on sexual morality
- Catholicism
- Christian theology
- Ten Commandments in Catholic theology
- Traditionalist Catholic
