= Protestant church music during and after the Reformation =

Historic period of Christian music

Church music during the Reformation developed during the Protestant Reformation in two schools of thought, the regulative and normative principles of worship, based on reformers John Calvin and Martin Luther. They derived their concepts in response to the Catholic church music, which they found distracting and too ornate. Both principles also pursued use of the native tongue, either alongside or in place of liturgical Latin.

== Background ==
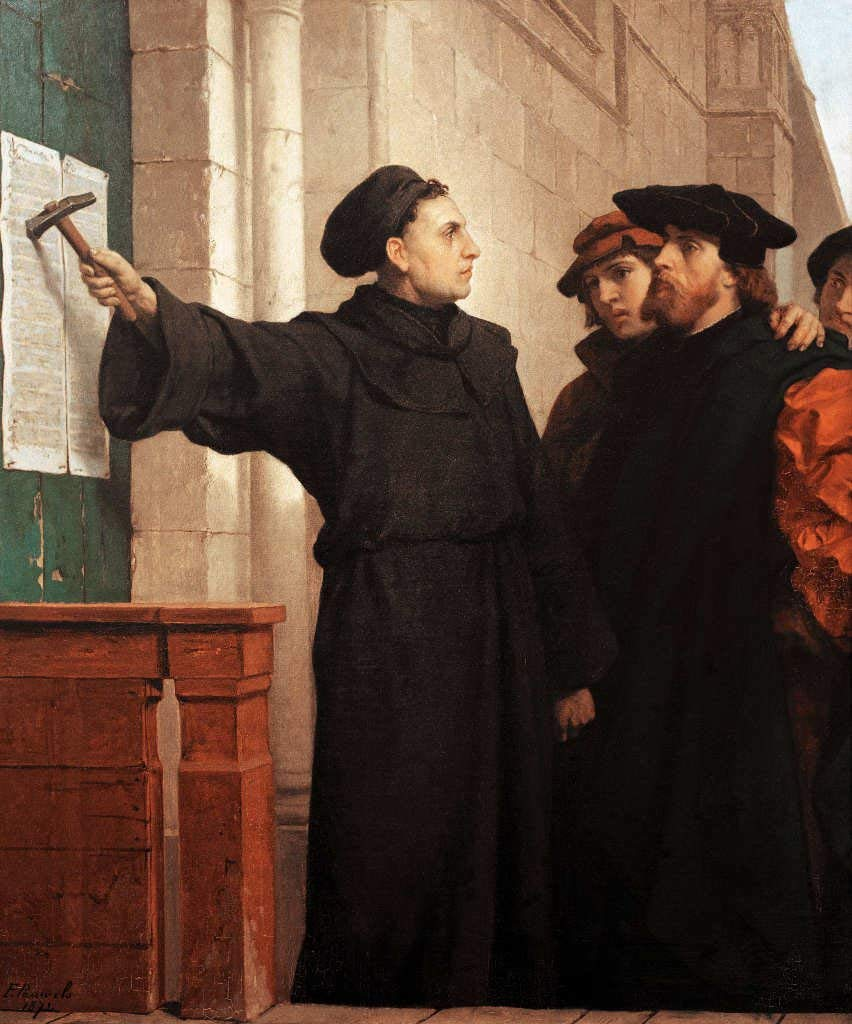
"Luther hammers his 95 theses to the door" at the Castle Church in Wittenberg, Germany

The Protestant Reformation, which rapidly spread throughout Europe in the sixteenth century, created sweeping changes in many facets of society. A call for reform and a subsequent break from the Roman Church by Martin Luther and his followers in 1521 following the Diet of Worms created an irreversible schism in the Church, and while this divide was more immediately noticeable politically, the Protestant movement changed many aspects of Europeans' daily lives through the reformed doctrine and practices of the new churches. One of the most noticeable changes to take place was the way in which Christians worshiped through music. Before and during the Reformation, much of Catholic worship music consisted of highly florid choral works, Gregorian plainchant, and responsive songs in praise of God and in honor of the Virgin Mary. Protestant reformers, however, sought to change Catholicism's perceived "dangers of overly theatrical performances, the unwarranted expense of elaborate ceremonies and enormous pipe organs and the uselessness of text unintelligible to the common man." The urge for reform in these areas created two main schools of thought: One which adhered to the regulative principle of worship music, and one which followed the normative principle, with the latter becoming far more prevalent as time progressed. The dissension between these two groups led to stark contrasts in worship practices.

== Emergence of Protestant church music ==
=== Normative principle of worship, and Martin Luther ===
The normative principle provides an elastic interpretation to the Bible and God's intention about worship music, claiming: “What the Scripture forbids not, it allows; and what it allows is not unlawful; and what is not unlawful may lawfully be done." This doctrine gave its followers great artistic and creative freedom in organizing worship services and composing hymns. Normative principlists often incorporated organ and other instruments into church music, and were not as stringent as regulative principlists on restricting the combination of various mediums of worship.

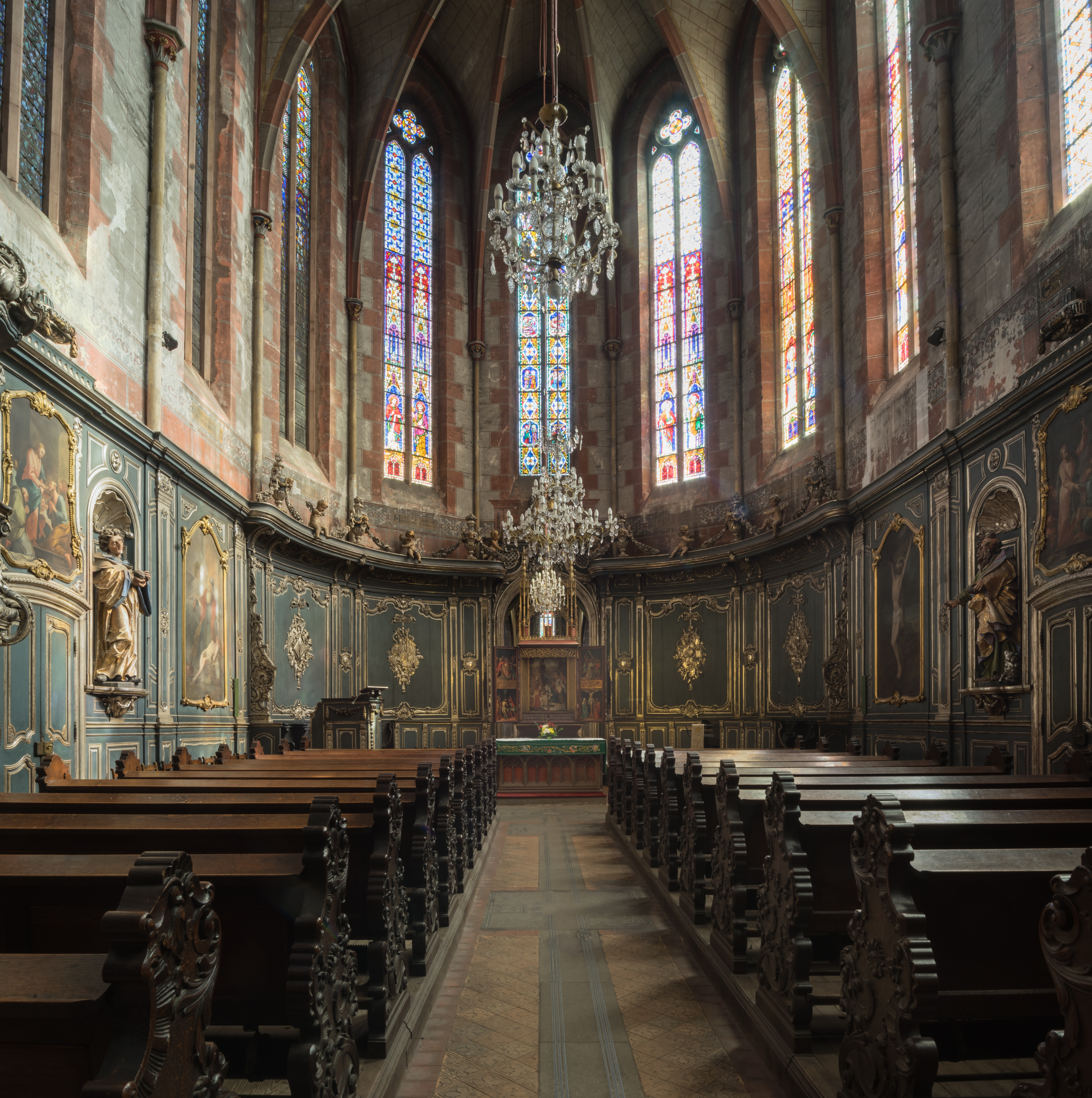
Choir of Saint-Pierre-le-Jeune Protestant Church, Strasbourg

The most notable follower of the normative principle was Martin Luther. Being a friar, Luther's life was steeped in the musical traditions of Roman chant and he had a deep love for music as a singer, lutenist, and composer. Luther would make use of his musical skills to become a tool for promoting the teaching reforms of the Reformation. Luther strongly supported worship music and emphasized its importance in the church, and was once witnessed remarking:

I always loved music; whoso has skill in this art, is of a good temperament, fitted for all things. We must teach music in schools; a schoolmaster ought to have skill in music, or I would not regard him; neither should we ordain young men as preachers, unless they have been well exercised in music.

Luther's hymns date from 1523 to 1543. The earliest Lutheran hymnal was the Achtliederbuch or First Lutheran hymnal of 1524, with eight hymns by Luther and by Paul Speratus. Luther wrote 37 hymns which survive today, though he perhaps wrote additional texts which were passed around informally. Well known of Luther's hymns, and still in use, are "Nun komm, der Heiden Heiland" (Savior of the Nations, Come), Vom Himmel hoch, da komm ich her" (From Heaven Above to Earth I Come), "Christ lag in Todesbanden" (Christ Jesus Lay in Death's Strong Bands), "Komm, Heiliger Geist, Herre Gott" (Come, Holy Ghost, God and Lord), "Wir glauben all an einen Gott" (We All Believe in One True God), "Mit Fried und Freud ich fahr dahin" (In Peace and Joy I Now Depart), "Ein feste Burg ist unser Gott" (A Mighty Fortress Is Our God), "Erhalt uns, Herr, bei deinem Wort" (Lord, Keep Us Steadfast in Thy Word), "Aus tiefer Not schrei ich zu dir" (Out of the Depths I Cry to Thee), "Nun bitten wir den Heiligen Geist" (We now implore God the Holy Ghost) and "Vater unser im Himmelreich" (Our Father, Thou in Heaven Above). These and many of the other hymns by Luther would constitute the base of many chorale-based compositions by Schütz, Bach, Brahms, and others. Luther built on traditional hymns in words and melodies, Latin chants, German songs, secular and sacred folk songs, and hymns from the Bohemian community. Claims that some of Luther's hymns were based on bar tunes or drinking songs perhaps expounded from the use of popular tunes in his hymns, and from later musical terminology that referred to many of these hymns as being in bar form. However, there is no evidence that actual drinking songs were used as hymn tunes.

In addition to hymns, Luther also composed German liturgical chants used in the Deutsche Messe (German mass) of 1526, as well as chant settings for various canticles, litanies, and a motet. Luther's most notable musical legacy is his development of hymnody in the vernacular German language. His intent was to include the laity in the liturgy, although the development of congregational singing among Lutherans was to be an uneven, and gradual process over the next three centuries. Involving the laity with singing hymns was a teaching tool. Some hymns were modeled after sections of Luther's Small Catechism, such as "Vater unser im Himmelreich" which was based on the Lord's Prayer. The hymns could by sung unaccompanied, but organs and choir supported congregational singing where such resources were available. Organ music would play a large role in Lutheran music later on.

Luther said that music ought to be “accorded the greatest honour and a place next to theology” due to its great importance. During the Reformation, Luther did much to encourage the composition and publication of hymns, and wrote numerous worship songs in German. In keeping with the normative principle, Luther popularized the use of songs inspired by Scripture, as opposed to Calvinist metered or even word-for-word recitations of the Psalms and other biblical texts. For example, Luther's widely popular hymn "Ein feste Burg ist unser Gott" while based on Psalm 46, contains language not directly taken from Scripture. This combination of Biblical language with composers' additions and basic ornamentation in Lutheran hymns allowed Luther and his followers to include emotional musical phrasing which appealed to a broader audience. However, Luther's approval of textual elaboration and musical complexities in chorales did not mean that he completely disregarded Protestant orthodoxies. While Luther supported the use of polyphony, he still made it clear that he regarded the main purpose of hymns as teaching the populace about Scripture and worshiping God.

One reason for Luther's adoption of the normative principle and his application of it with his own church music was to more effectively disseminate his ideas, particularly to other German speaking areas. Luther's hymns were primarily written in the vernacular and consisted of universal themes such as hope, peace, and grace, which transcended socioeconomic boundaries. Luther also increased the popularity of his songs by setting religious text and his own improvised lyrics to secular folk tunes known well throughout German provinces. Luther even penned hymns which touched on political issues and promoted the Reformation. In his zeitungslied (Note: See the definition of "zeitunglied" from educalingo.com) (newspaper song), "Ein neues Lied wir heben an" (A new song here shall be begun), Luther condemned the burning of Jan van Essen and Hendrik Vos, two young Augustinian canons active in the Reformation. He commended their faith and witness to the gospel while and censuring their condemnation. These qualities made Luther's works well received across Germany, and many were soon translated into other languages. "Ein feste Burg ist unser Gott" (A Mighty Fortress is Our God) in particular has since been translated into 53 languages.

=== Regulative principle of worship, and John Calvin ===
Many Protestant reformers, drawing from the Bible and the concept of Sola scriptura, Latin for by scripture alone, argued that worship music ought to be derived directly from the book of Psalms in the Old Testament. This concept came to be known as the regulative principle. Its adherents asserted that “worship is by divine warrant", and that God intended mankind to worship Him through Scripture only, since the Bible serves as God’s revelation to man on how He is to be worshiped. For instance, in the Heidelberg Catechism, the author, German Reformed theologian Zacharias Ursinus states, “Q. What does God require in the second commandment? / A. We are not to make an image of God in any way, nor to worship Him in any other manner than he has commanded in His Word.” Followers of the regulative principle vehemently opposed worship music containing text not from Scripture verbatim, and thus their worship services contained only hymns arranged from the Psalms (hence the term "psalmody"). Regulative principlists were often firm and intransigent in their beliefs, as is seen in the Belgic Confession, where the author decrees, "The whole manner of worship which God requires of us is written in it [the Bible] at length. It is therefore unlawful for any one [sic], even for an apostle, to teach otherwise than we are now taught in Holy Scripture: yes, even if it be an angel from heaven, as the apostle Paul says."

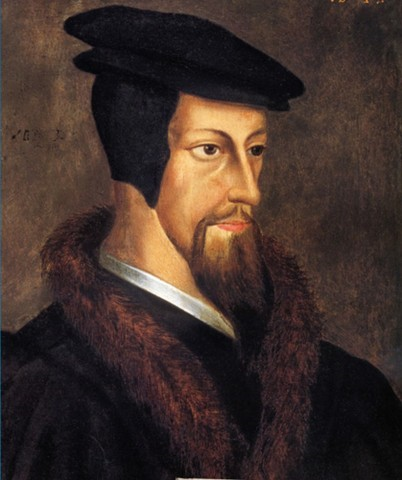
John Calvin

There were many prominent theologians and church leaders during the Reformation who adhered to the regulative principle. On one extreme, Huldrych Zwingli (1484-1531), a Swiss priest, rejected all forms of music within worship. He “removed all art works from the church... [and] destroyed organs and other musical instruments… because according to him, they promoted self-indulgence.” However, most regulative principle advocates still promoted the use of worship music in the church, only in the sense that only Scripture could be used in songs.

John Calvin (1509-1564) was a regulative principle supporter who encouraged worship music. A Frenchman, Calvin studied civil law in Paris and Orléans, but was soon pressured to leave France due to heavy opposition to his Protestant sympathies. He eventually relocated to Geneva, where he further synthesized his doctrine and continued to aid the reform movement, especially through his theological dissertations. Calvin’s attitude towards music in the Church was complex. Like all who followed the regulative principle, he was extremely cautious about how worship music was utilized, because he believed God laid out very specific directions in the Bible on how one could worship. For example, Calvin initially allowed the use of instruments in worship music, but “advocate[ed] a careful and skillful use” of them. In fact, he later banned instruments from being used in his congregation, claiming that they were too strongly tied to antiquated and unorthodox methods from before the Reformation. Calvin also asserted that “There could be no worship of God without the proper preaching of the Word.” In selecting hymns for church services, Calvin avoided anything that may have invited “sensuality and self-gratification.” To this effect, many of the songs which received his approval were simple in nature and lacked the melodic and harmonic complexities of many Catholic masses. They were “sung syllabically,” and the melodies moved primarily by conjunct motion, avoiding large and uncomfortable intervals.

One element which Calvin added to worship music was children’s choirs. Calvin was deeply concerned for the piety and religious devotion of parishioners, and posited that children could "teach adults simplicity, childlike devotion, and a sincere heart when singing, even though there might be problems with intonation and the like." While many Protestants, including followers of Martin Luther, objected to Calvin’s rather staunch approach to music, Calvin did much to develop a new form of music separate from hundreds of years of Catholic doctrine and ritual. His use of the vernacular in the recitation of the Psalms made worship music more accessible and comprehensible to the public, and his simple melodies and inclusion of children’s choirs encouraged congregational participation in worship services.

== Anabaptist church music ==
Even Thomas Müntzer, who had introduced a reformatory German-language liturgy before Luther, wrote new hymns. Müntzer relied mainly on well-known Gregorian melodies, which he translated into German. Some of his songs, such as his translation of the Latin Conditor alme siderum can be found today in both Catholic and Protestant hymnals.

In the context of the Radical Reformation movement, new hymns were created. Particularly noteworthy is the first printed in 1564 Anabaptist hymn book Ausbund, which was used until the 19th century in southern German Mennonites and even today in the Amish in North America. The core of the hymn book was 51 songs whose authorship is unknown save that they were all written between 1535 and 1540 by Anabaptists in the dungeon of the Veste Oberhaus castle. They were mostly sung to folk melodies. Also popular was Das schön Gesangbüchlein from 1565, which contained 122 songs. Known Anabaptist songwriters include Felix Manz, one of the co-founders of the first Anabaptist church in 1525, as well as Michael Sattler, Hans Hut, Leonhard Schiemer and George Blaurock. Some churches of Anabaptist heritage today still practice the lining out of hymns.

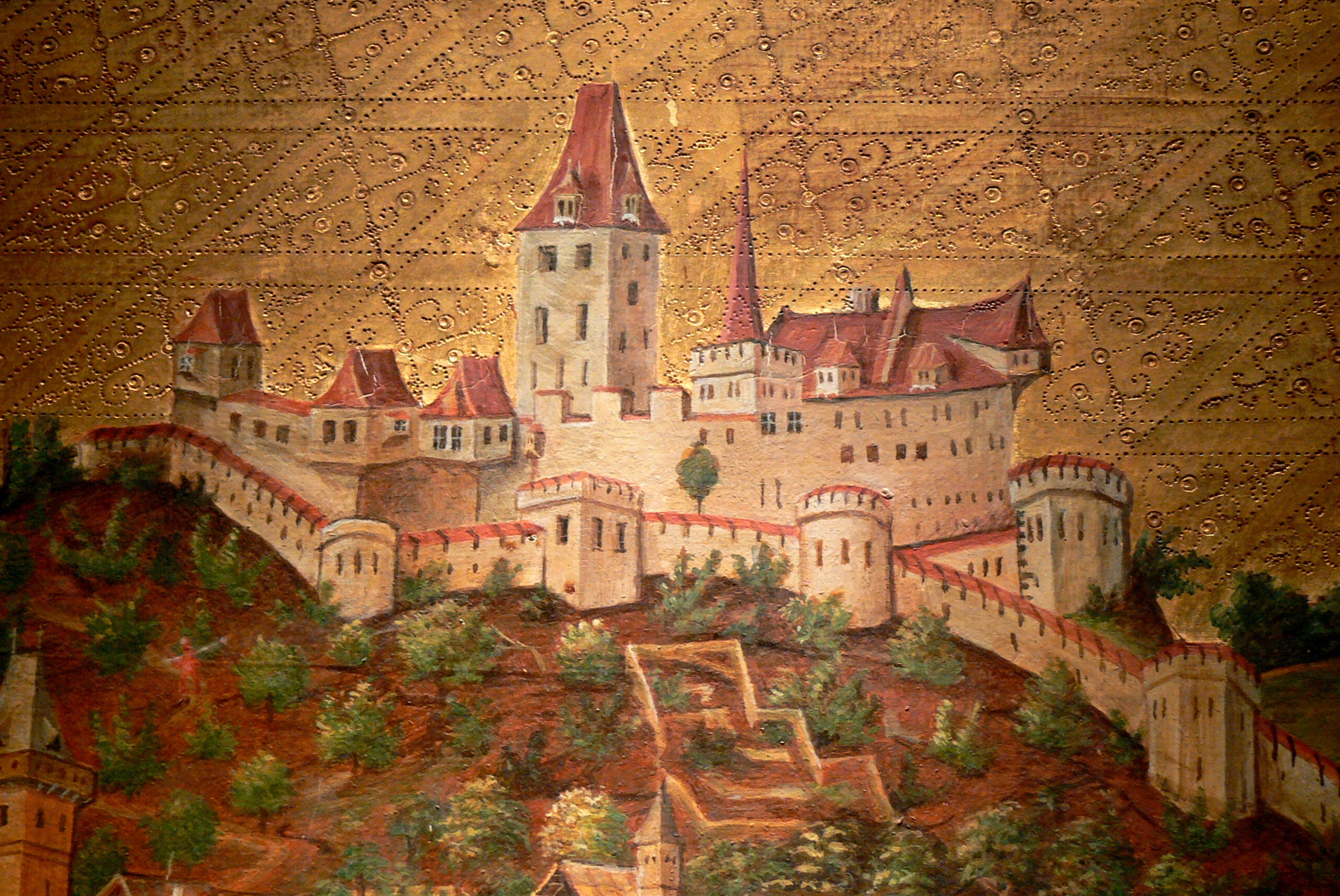
14th century painting of the Veste Oberhaus castle

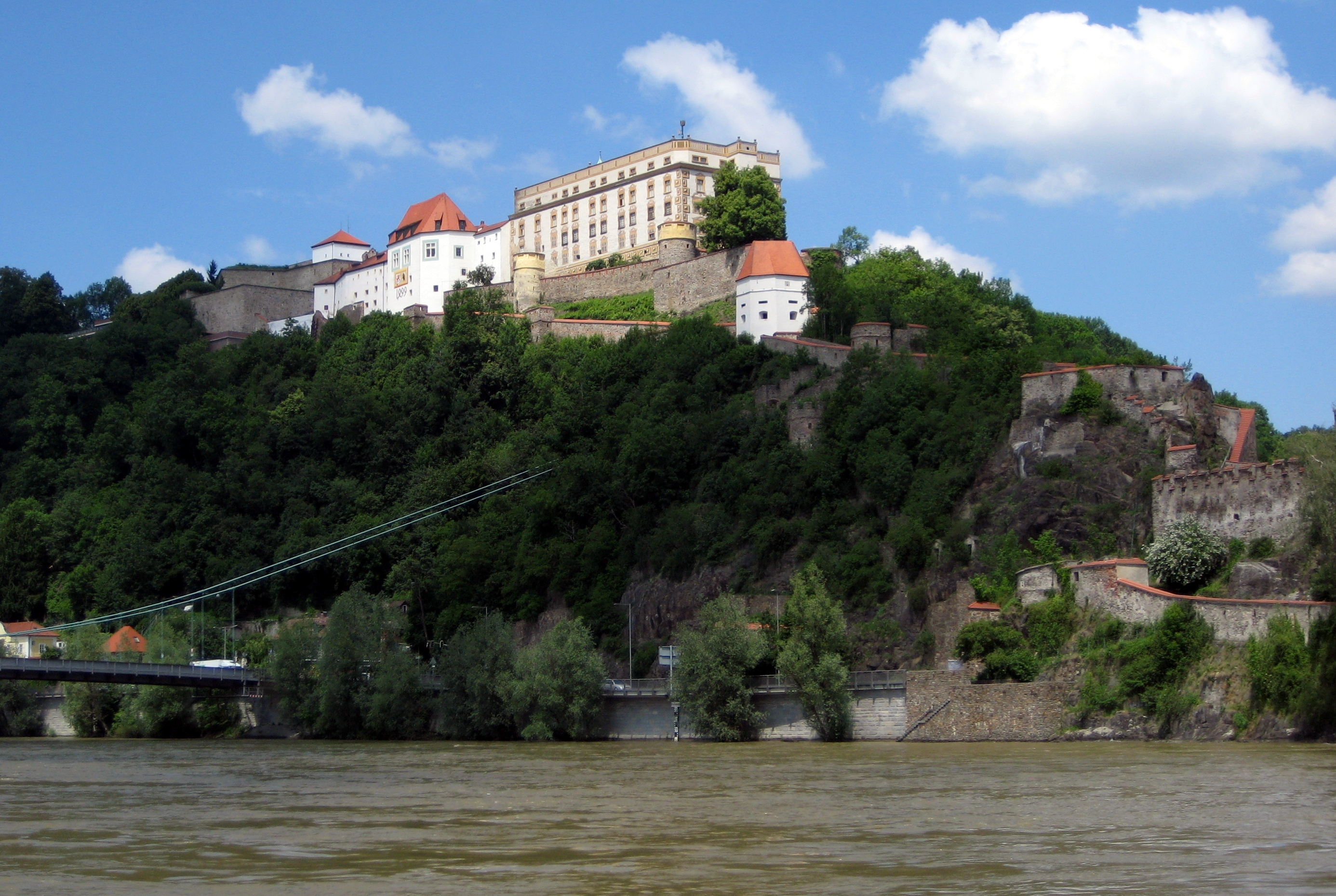
Veste Oberhaus today

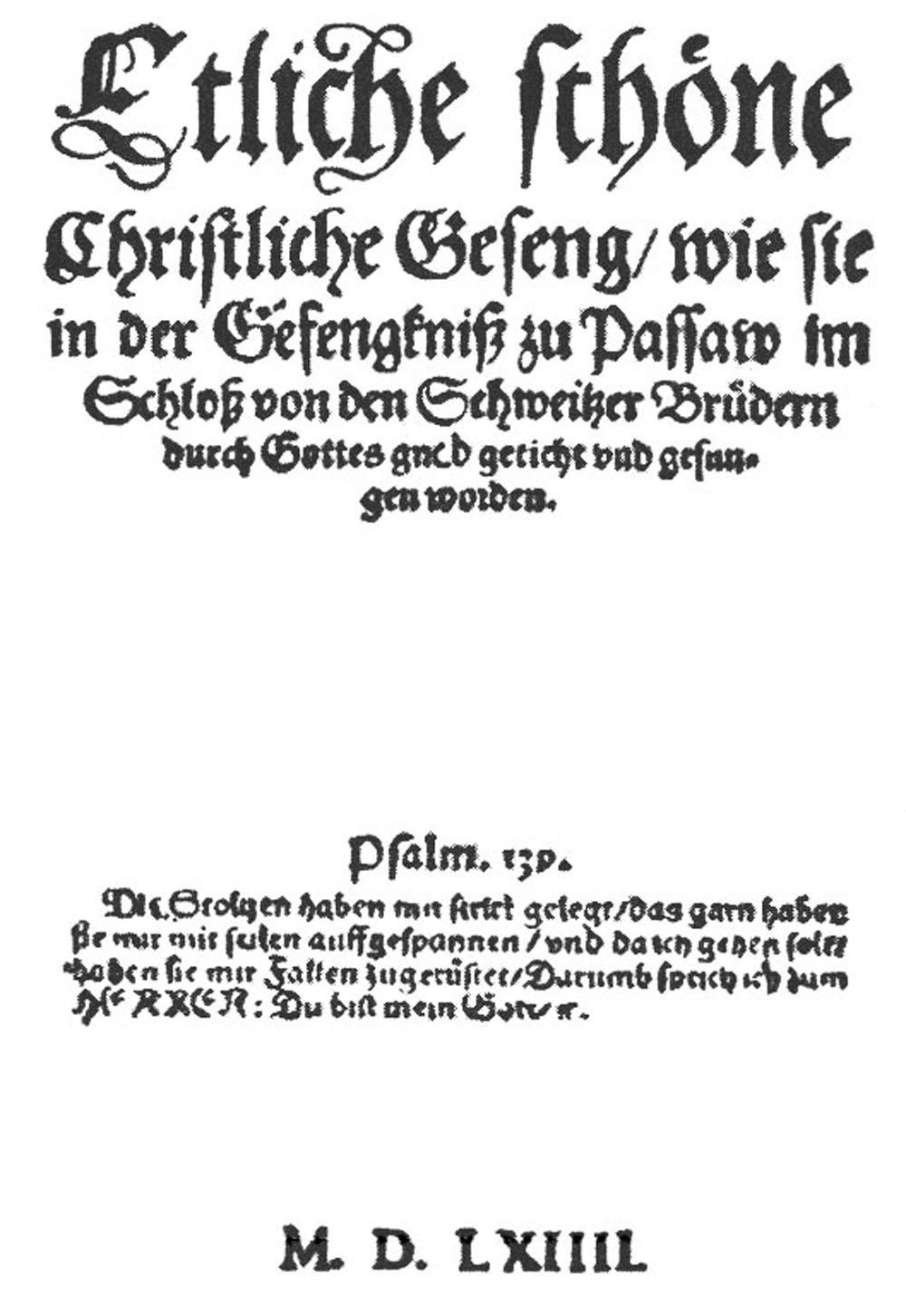
Ausbund title page

== Anglican church music ==
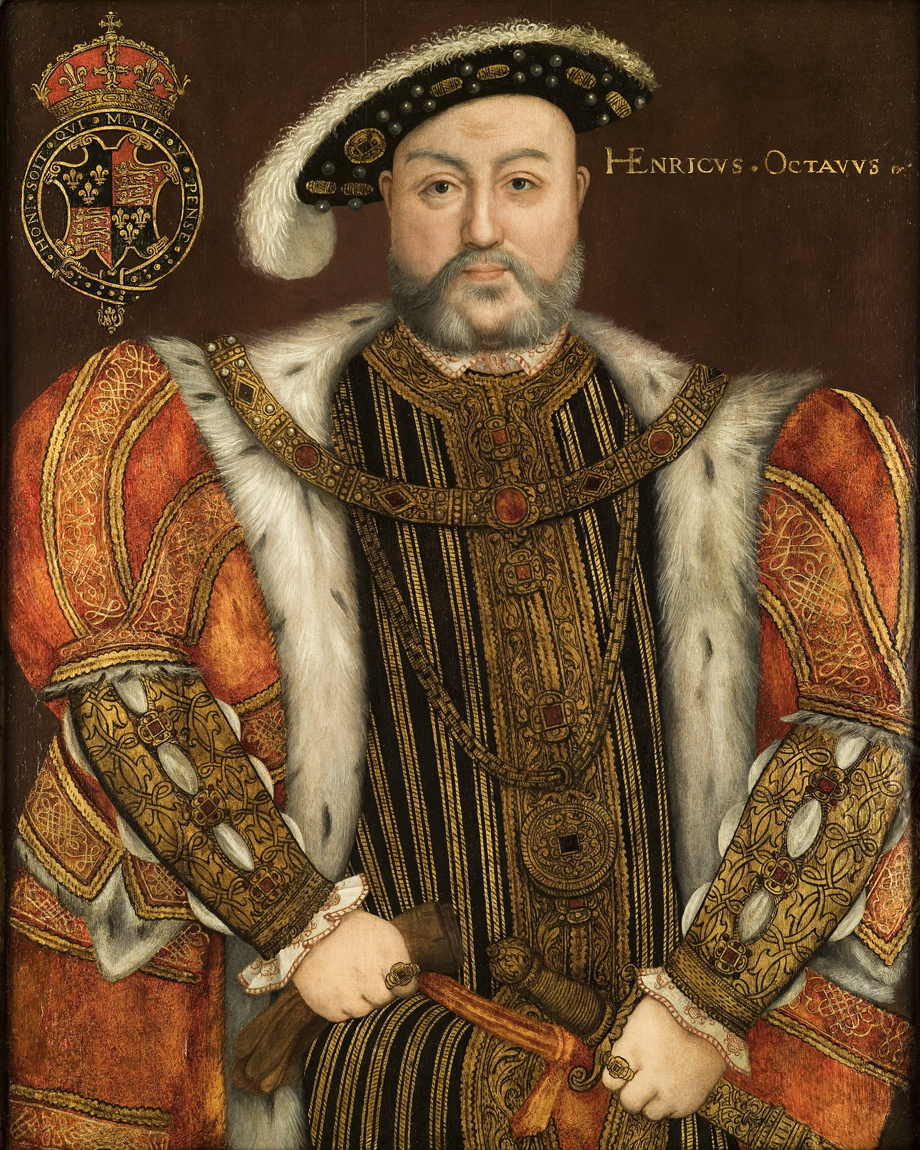
King Henry VIII of England (1491 –1547)

During the same time period of that Luther and Calvin were active on the mainland, England too was influenced and experienced its own distinct reformation movement. King Henry VIII, after failing to convince Pope Clement VII to annul his marriage to Catherine of Aragon so that he could marry Anne Boleyn, proclaimed himself head of the Church of England, an action which was officialised in Parliament’s 1534 Act of Supremacy. After this, England’s political ties to Rome were severed, but although the Church of England adopted a primarily Calvinist theology, it still retained many of the ecclesiastical traditions of Catholic services, to the dismay of the more conservative Calvinists. Given England’s unique situation, English Protestant music emerged as its own distinct genre during and after the Reformation. In some ways, it reflected elements of Calvinism; for instance, Calvinist psalmodies were exceedingly popular in mid-sixteenth century England. However, English congregations also utilized materials which would be considered more Lutheran in style, including broadside ballads which were repurposed for religious use. A particularly common source of worship material in English churches was the Second Book of Common Prayer, commissioned by the Protestant King Edward VI in 1552.

The English Reformation oversaw the proliferation of English Protestant composers and the writing of many English psalters (musical arrangements of the Book of Psalms). This was in part due to a reaction against Catholic worship music following the English Reformation. English Protestants particularly denounced Catholic music due to the fact “that it was performed in a foreign tongue [Latin],” which they saw as conflicting with parts of Scripture and therefore with the will of God. Because of this, English clergymen and composers began to form a unique canon of English worship music distinct from that of continental Europe. Perhaps the most notable early English Protestant composer was Issac Watts, known as the “Father of English Hymnody". Watts broke with the popular Calvinist theology of the time by altering his arrangements of the Psalms to better reflect Christian elements found only in the New Testament, as is evident by the title of his work, The Psalms of David Imitated in the Language of the New Testament. Another prominent English composer of the time was Benjamin Keach (1640-1704), a minister and leader of the Particular Baptist denomination. Keach is responsible for being the first songwriter to popularize the singing of hymns as opposed to purely Psalms in English churches, and his song collection, titled A Feast of Fat Things, became a staple in many English Protestant churches. While many English composers experimented with polyphonic chorales and the use of multiple instruments, the English Crown, under the young Protestant King Edward VI, began to tightly restrict these elements during a brief revival of English-Calvinist regulative theology. However, many of these restrictions on church music were lifted with Edward VI’s premature death and the Catholic Mary Tudor’s ascension to the throne in 1553.

== Scottish church music ==
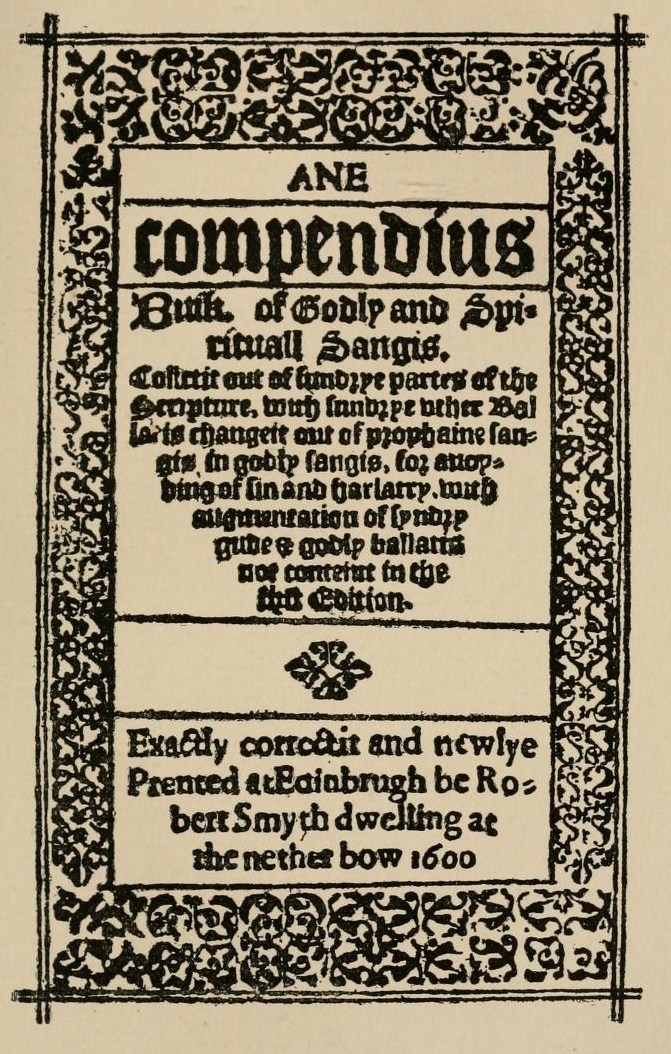
A reprint of the 1600 cover of The Gude and Godlie Ballatis

The outstanding Scottish composer of the first half of the sixteenth century was Robert Carver (c. 1488–1558), a canon of Scone Abbey. His complex polyphonic music could only have been performed by a large and highly trained choir such as the one employed in the Scottish Chapel Royal. James V was also a patron to figures including David Peebles (c. 1510–79?), whose best known work "Si quis diligit me" (text from John 14:23), is a motet for four voices. These were probably only two of many accomplished composers from this era, whose work has largely only survived in fragments. Much of what survives of church music from the first half of the sixteenth century is due to the diligent work of Thomas Wode (d. 1590), vicar of St Andrews, who compiled a part book from now lost sources, which was continued by unknown hands after his death.

The Reformation had a significant impact on church music. The song schools of the abbeys, cathedrals and collegiate churches were closed down, choirs disbanded, music books and manuscripts destroyed and organs removed from churches. The Lutheranism that influenced the early Scottish Reformation attempted to accommodate Catholic musical traditions into worship, drawing on Latin hymns and vernacular songs. The most important product of this tradition in Scotland was The Gude and Godlie Ballatis (1567), which were spiritual satires on popular ballads composed by the brothers James, John and Robert Wedderburn. Never adopted by the kirk, they nevertheless remained popular and were reprinted from the 1540s to the 1620s.

The Calvinism that came to dominate the Scottish Reformation would seek to replace Catholic musical tradition and popular music with metricised versions of the Psalms, which it considered inherently more biblical. The Scottish Psalter of 1564 was commissioned by the Assembly of the Church. It drew on the work of French musician Clément Marot, Calvin's contributions to the Strasbourg Psalter of 1539 and English writers, particularly the 1561 edition of the Psalter produced by William Whittingham for the English congregation in Geneva. The intention was to produce individual tunes for each psalm, but of 150 psalms, 105 had proper tunes and in the seventeenth century, common tunes, which could be used for psalms with the same metre, became more frequent in the seventeenth century. Because whole congregations would now sing these psalms, unlike the trained choirs who had sung the many parts of polyphonic hymns, there was a need for simplicity and most church compositions were confined to homophonic settings.

During his personal reign James VI attempted to revive the song schools, with an act of parliament passed in 1579, demanding that councils of the largest burghs set up "ane sang scuill with ane maister sufficient and able for insturctioun of the yowth in the said science of musik". Five new schools were opened within four years of the act and by 1633 there were at least twenty-five. Most of those without song schools made provision within their grammar schools. Polyphony was incorporated into editions of the Psalter from 1625, but in the few locations where these settings were used, the congregation sang the melody and trained singers the contra-tenor, treble and bass parts. However, the triumph of the Presbyterians in the National Covenant of 1638 led to and end of polyphony and a new psalter in common metre, but without tunes, was published in 1650. In 1666 The Twelve Tunes for the Church of Scotland, composed in Four Parts (which actually contained 14 tunes), designed for use with the 1650 Psalter, was first published in Aberdeen. It would go through five editions by 1720. By the late seventeenth century these two works had become the basic corpus of the psalmody sung in the kirk.

== Icelandic church music, 1550—1594 ==
A suggestion of what the earliest Lutheran liturgies in Iceland may have sounded like is found in two manuscript fragments now in Sweden (Stockh perg 8vo no. 10 and S. 252a), discovered by musicologist Árni Heimir Ingólfsson in 2019. They suggest that an early interim solution was to sing plainchant with the texts translated into Icelandic, such as the chants "Ecce dies veniet," "Inviolata," and "Puer natus est nobis," to name but a few.

When they were eventually published, the 1589 Missal and 1594 Graduale were widely distributed and would shape Icelandic church singing for more than two centuries. The final (nineteenth) edition of the Graduale was published in 1779 and it was in use until the nineteenth century, although by that time the melodies themselves had been much transformed through oral transmission. While both sources ostensibly build on Danish models, they are quite different from the Danish publications and perhaps suggest an urge for the Icelandic bishops to assert the independence of the Icelandic church vis-a-vis the Danish one.

== See also ==
Topics

- Hymnody of continental Europe
- Music of the British Isles
- Hymn tune
- Lutheran chorale
- Lutheran hymn
- Anglican church music
- Scottish church music
- Exclusive psalmody
- Normative principle
- Anglican chant
- Homophony vs. Polyphony
- Falsobordone
- Verse anthem

Liturgies

- Reformed worship
- Calvin's liturgy
- Formula missae
- Deutsche Messe
- Ecclesiastical Latin
- Liturgical Struggle
- Lutheran and Anglican Mass in music
- Cyclic mass vs. Paraphrase mass
- Roman vs. Sarum Rites
- Sequence

Hymnals

- First and Second Lutheran hymnals
- First Wittenberg hymnal
- Ausbund
- Swenske songer
- Thomissøn's hymnal
- Book of Common Prayer
- Metrical psalters
- Book of Common Order
- Souterliedekens
- Genevan Psalter
- Scottish Psalter
- Whole Book of Psalms

Secular music

- English Madrigal School
- Greensleeves
- German madrigals
- Meistersinger
- Moravian traditional music
