= Catholic probabilism =

Christian theological doctrine

In Catholic moral theology, probabilism provides a way of answering the question about what to do when one does not know what to do. Probabilism proposes that one can follow an authoritative opinion regarding whether an act may be performed morally, even though the opposite opinion is more probable. (An opinion is probable when, because of intrinsic or extrinsic arguments, it is able to gain the assent of many prudent men.) It was first formulated in 1577 by Bartholomew Medina, OP, who was a member of the School of Salamanca and taught at the University of Salamanca.

== Formulation ==
Probabilism is a way of approaching difficult matters of conscience. In such cases, according to probabilism, one may safely follow a doctrine approved by a recognized Doctor of the Church, even if the opposite opinion is supported by—or "more probable" as judged by—other criteria, such as those of science or other authoritative sources. Catholic probabilists believe that, whether there is question of the existence or of the cessation of a law, it is lawful to act on the less safe opinion if it is solidly probable, even though the safe view is certainly more probable.

A more radical view, "minus probabilissimus", holds that an action is permissible if a single opinion allowing that action is available, even if the overwhelming weight of opinion proscribes it. This view was advanced by the Spanish theologian Bartolomé de Medina (1527–1581) and defended by many Jesuits such as Luis Molina (1528–1581). It was heavily criticised by Blaise Pascal in his Provincial Letters as leading to moral laxity. Probabilism was already under heavy criticism by this time, which was amplified by the Letters. It has been said that they were "especially detrimental to probabilism's long-term reputation".

According to Probabilism, whenever a prohibiting law is certain, the subjects of the law are bound to abstain from performing the action which the law forbids, unless they are excused by one of the ordinary exempting causes. On the other hand, when it is certain that no law forbids an action, there is no obligation to abstain from performing it, under this doctrine. Between these two extremes there can be varying degrees of uncertainty about the existence or cessation of a prohibiting law. There is doubt in the strict sense when the intellect neither assents nor dissents, because either there are no positive arguments for and against the law, or the arguments for and against the law are equal in strength. The opinion which favours the law, and which is technically called the safe opinion, can be more probable (in the specialized sense being discussed) than the opinion which favours liberty and which still retains solid (objective) probability.

In estimating the degree which is required and which suffices for solid probability, moralists lay down the general principle that an opinion is solidly probable which by reason of intrinsic or extrinsic arguments is able to gain the assent of many prudent men. Adherents to Probabilism hold that extrinsic authority can have sufficient weight to make an opinion solidly probable; but there is divergence of view in estimating what number of experts is able to give an opinion this solid probability. The prevailing theory holds that if five or six theologians, notable for prudence and learning, independently adhere to an opinion their view is highly probable, if it has not been set aside by authoritative decisions or by intrinsic arguments which they have failed to solve. Even one theologian that is regarded as highly authoritative, such as St. Alphonsus Liguori, is able to make an opinion probable in this sense. Under this view, no justification in terms of reason is sufficient to give an opinion solid probability, nor does the support of theologians who merely repeat the opinions of others.

If one opinion is not only less safe (in that it goes against the law) but also speculatively uncertain, then it is prohibited by Probabilism, until all reasonable effort has been made to remove the uncertainty, by considering the arguments on both sides and by consulting available authorities. One question at issue between different moral systems concerns the way in which the speculative uncertainty is changed into practical certainty; each system has what is called a reflex principle of its own, by which practical certainty can be obtained.

These various moral systems come into play only when the question concerns the lawfulness of an action. If the uncertainty concerns the validity of an action which must certainly be valid, it is not enough to act on mere probability unless, indeed, this is of such a nature as to make the Church certainly supply what is needed for the validity of the act. Thus, apart from necessity, these systems do not allow one to act on mere probability when the validity of the sacraments is in question. Additionally, they do not allow one to act on mere probability when there is question of gaining an end which is obligatory, since certain means must be employed to gain a certainly required end. Hence, when eternal salvation is at stake, these systems demand more than uncertain means as justification. Moreover, their conception of justice demands equality, and as such excludes the use of probability when the established rights of another are concerned. Consequently, if a certain debt has not been certainly paid, at least a payment pro rata dubii is required according to the prevailing view.

The central doctrine of probabilism is that in every doubt that concerns merely the lawfulness or unlawfulness of an action it is permissible to follow a solidly probable opinion in favour of liberty, even though the opposing view is more probable. Probabilists apply their theory only when there is question merely of the lawfulness or unlawfulness of an action, because in other cases certainty might be demanded on various grounds, as happens when the validity of the sacraments, the attainment of an obligatory end, and the established rights of another are concerned. They apply their doctrine whether the doubt about the lawfulness or unlawfulness of an action be a doubt of law, or a doubt of fact which can be reduced to a doubt of law. Thus if it is solidly probable that Friday morning has not yet set in, there is a doubt of fact which can be reduced to a doubt of law as to whether it is lawful in the circumstances to take meat. They also apply their doctrine not merely to human but also to Divine and natural laws, on the ground that the Divine legislator is not more exacting than a human legislator. They apply their principles whether the existence or the cessation of a law is concerned, since, in their estimation, liberty is always in possession. They also apply their doctrine even though the person whose action is in question believes that the safe opinion is the more probable opinion. If, however, he looks on the safe opinion as morally certain, he cannot lawfully use the opinion of others who differ from him. Nor can a person on the same occasion use opposing probabilities in his favour in reference to several obligations of which one or another would be certainly violated; thus a priest cannot lawfully take meat on the probability that Friday has already elapsed, and at the same time postpone the reading of Compline on the probability that Friday will not elapse for some time. Finally, probabilists insist that the opinion in favour of liberty must be based on solid arguments and not on mere flimsy reasons which are insufficient to gain the assent of prudent men.

== History of probabilism ==
After its formulation by the Dominican Medina in Salamanca late in the 16th century, probabilism was widely held by respected Catholic theologians, including many Jesuits and Dominicans, for the next century. Jesuits such as Gabriel Vásquez further developed probabilism, distinguishing intrinsic, argument-based probabilism and extrinsic, authority-based probabilism. Abuses of probabilism led to moral laxism such as that of Juan Caramuel y Lobkowitz.

=== Precursors ===
Fathers, doctors and theologians of the Church at times solved cases on principles which apparently were probabilist in tendency. Augustine of Hippo declared that marriage with infidels was not to be regarded as unlawful since it was not clearly condemned in the New Testament: "Quoniam revera in Novo Testamento nihil inde praeceptum est, et ideo aut licere creditum est, aut velut dubium derelictum". Gregory of Nazianzus laid down, against a Novatianist writer, that a second marriage was not unlawful, since the prohibition was doubtful. Thomas Aquinas maintained that a precept does not bind except through the medium of knowledge; and probabilists are accustomed to point out that knowledge implies certainty.

However, many theologians were Probabiliorist in their principles before the sixteenth century, including Sylvester Prierias, Conradus, and Thomas Cajetan. Consequently, Probabiliorism had already gained a strong hold on theologians when Medina arrived on the scene.

=== Bartholomew Medina ===
Bartholomew Medina, a Dominican, was the first to expound the moral system which is known as probabilism. In his Expositio in 1am 2ae S. Thomae he wrote:

If an opinion is probable it is lawful to follow it, even though the opposing opinion is more probable.

His system soon became the common teaching of the theologians, so that in the introduction to his Regula Morum Father Terill maintained that until 1638 Catholic theologians of all schools were probabilists. There were exceptions such as Rebellus, Comitolus and Philalethis, but the great body of the theologians around 1600 were on the side of Medina.

=== Jansenist opposition ===
With the rise of Jansenism a new phase in the history of the probabilist controversies began. In 1653 Innocent X condemned the five propositions taken from Jansen's book Augustinus, and in 1655 the Louvain theologians condemned probabilism. Tutiorism was adopted by the Jansenists, and the Irish Jansenist theologian John Sinnichius (1603–1666), was the foremost defender of the Rigorist doctrines. He held that it is not lawful to follow even a most probable opinion in favour of liberty. (Here, "liberty" refers to freedom, in the sense of not being bound by the strictures of (a specific) law.) Jansenist Rigorism spread into France, and Pascal attacked probabilism in his Lettres Provinciales, which were in turn condemned by Alexander VII in 1657.

After the condemnation of Jansenism, several 18th-century theologians unfolded a moderate form of Tutiorism. Others favoured Laxism, which maintained that a slightly probable opinion in favour of liberty could safely be followed.

== Opposing views ==
=== Probabiliorism ===
Probabiliorism (Latin probabilior, "more likely"), holds that when there is a preponderance of evidence on one side of a controversy one is obliged to follow that side. Theologians who put forward the system known as Probabiliorism, hold that the less safe opinion can be lawfully followed only when it is more probable than the safe opinion.

This opinion was in vogue before the time of Medina, and was renewed in the middle of the seventeenth century as an antidote against Laxism. Its revival was principally due to the efforts of popes Alexander VII and Innocent XI. In 1656, a general chapter of the Dominicans urged all members of the order to adopt Probabiliorism. Though previously Dominican theologians like Medina, Ledesma, Domingo Báñez, Alvarez and Ildephonsus were probabilists, subsequently the Dominicans in the main were Probabiliorists. In 1700, the Gallican clergy, under Bossuet, accepted Probabiliorism. The Franciscans as a rule were Probabiliorists, and in 1762 a general chapter of the order at Mantua ordered its members to follow Probabiliorism. In 1598, a general chapter of the Theatines adopted Probabiliorism. The Augustinians, Carmelites, Trinitarians and many Benedictines were also Probabiliorists.

Probabiliorism was also held by many Jesuits. Thyrsus Gonzalez, a Jesuit professor at the University of Salamanca, favoured Probabiliorism in his Fundamentum Theologiae Moralis (1670–72). When the book was sent to the Jesuit General Oliva in 1673, permission for publication was refused. Pope Innocent XI favoured Gonzalez and, in 1680, sent a decree through the Holy Office to Oliva ordering that liberty be given to the members of the order to write in favour of Probabiliorism and against probabilism. Gonzalez was elected general of the order in 1687, but his book was not published until 1694.

Since the time of Alphonsus Liguori, probabiliorism has to a great extent disappeared.

=== Æquiprobabilism ===
During the controversies between the probabilists and the probabiliorists, the system known as Æquiprobabilism was not clearly brought into prominence. Æquiprobabilism holds that it is not lawful to follow the less safe opinion when the safe opinion is certainly more probable; that it is not lawful to act on the less safe opinion even when it is equally probable with the safe opinion, if the uncertainty regards the cessation of a law; but that if the existence of the law is in question, it is lawful to follow the less safe opinion if it has equal or nearly equal probability with the safe opinion. Many of the moderate probabilists of the sixteenth and seventeenth centuries foreshadowed in their writings the theory to which, in his later-days, St. Alphonsus adhered.

This view gained vigour and persistence from the teaching of Alphonsus Liguori, who began his theological career as a Probabiliorist, subsequently defended probabilism, especially in a treatise entitled Dissertatio scholastico-moralis pro usu moderato opinionis probabilis in concursu probabilioris (1749, 1755), and finally embraced Æquiprobabilism about 1762. In a new dissertation he laid down the two propositions that it is lawful to act on the less safe opinion, when it is equally probable with the safe opinion, and that it is not lawful to follow the less safe opinion when the safe opinion is notably and certainly more probable. In the sixth edition (1767) of his Moral Theology he again expressed these views and indeed towards the end of his life frequently declared that he was not a probabilist.

Probabilists sometimes hold that St. Alphonsus never changed his opinion once he had discarded Probabiliorism for probabilism, though he changed his manner of expressing his view so as to exclude Laxist teaching and to give an indication of what must be regarded as a solidly probable opinion. As a matter of fact, a comparison between the "Moral Theologies" of moderate probabilists and of Æquiprobabilists shows little practical difference between the two systems, so far at least as the uncertainty regards the existence as distinguished from the cessation of a law.

Even many Dominican theologians have espoused the cause of Æquiprobabilism. Francis Ter Haar and L. Wouters engaged in controversy with August Lehmkuhl who, especially in his Probabilismus Vindicatus (1906) and in the eleventh edition of his Theologia Moralis (1910), strongly supported the probabilist thesis which had been accepted during the nineteenth century by most theologians.

=== Compensationism ===
Around 1900 a system known as Compensationism arose, which attempted to reconcile probabilism, probabiliorism, and aequiprobabilism. Compensationism holds that not only the degree of probability attaching to various opinions must be taken into account, but also the importance of the law and the degree of utility attaching to the performance of the action whose morality is in question. According to this system, the more important the law, and the smaller the degree of probability attaching to the less safe opinion, the greater must be the compensating utility which will permit the performance of the action of which the lawfulness is uncertain.

This theory was proposed by Mannier, Laloux and Potton; but it gained little support and has not yet become a rival of the old theories of probabilism, æquiprobabilism or even probabiliorism.

=== Tutiorism ===
Tutiorism (Latin tutior, "safer"), sometimes also called "rigorism", holds that in case of doubt one must take the morally safer side. It is also sometimes called "rigorism". Absolute tutiorism has been formally condemned by the Holy See, but a moderate form still exists.

== Laxism ==
Laxism maintains that if the less safe opinion is slightly probable it can be followed with a safe conscience. It has never received serious support from Catholic theologians, and has been formally condemned by the Holy See.

== Status of the question ==
=== Arguments for probabilism ===
==== External arguments ====
If Probabilism is untrue, then proposing it is seriously detrimental to the spiritual life of the faithful, since it permits actions which ought to be forbidden, and the Church cannot tolerate or give approval to such a moral system. But the Church during many centuries has tolerated probabilism, and has given it approval in the person of St. Alphonsus. Hence probabilism is not a false system of morals. That the Church has tolerated probabilism is shown from the numerous approved authors, who, since the time of Medina, have defended it without interference on the part of ecclesiastical authority. That the Church has given positive approval to probabilism in the person of St. Alphonsus is proved from the fact that his works including his treatises in favour of probabilism, received official sanction from the Decree of 18 May 1803, the reply of the Sacred Penitentiary of 5 July 1831, the Bull of Canonization of 26 May 1839, and the Apostolic Letters of 7 July 1871 (cf. Lehmkuhl, "Theologia Moralis", I, nn. 165–75). – Æquiprobabilists reply that this argument proves too much for probabilists, since the Church has also tolerated Æquiprobabilism, and has given it positive approval in the person of St. Alphonsus, whose works in favour of Æquiprobabilism received the sanction of the Holy See in the official documents of 1803, 1831, 1839, and 1871. If Æquiprobabilism is false, it is seriously detrimental to the spiritual life of the faithful, since it imposes burdens which ought not to be imposed. Hence, if any argument can be derived for probabilism from the toleration or approval of the Church, a similar argument can be derived therefrom for Æquiprobabilism.

In interpreting her own laws the Church applies the principles of probabilism, what is true of the Church is equally true of other legislators, because God is not a more exacting Legislator than His Church, nor is the State to be presumed more strict than God and the Church. Æquiprobabilists reply to this argument that when the less safe opinion is certainly less probable than the safe opinion, the former has lost solid probability and consequently cannot, so far as conscience is concerned, obtain the privileges which the Divine Legislator, the Church, and the State concede in the case of really doubtful laws. Moreover, many of these rules of law directly apply to the external forum and ought not, without due limitation, be transferred to the forum of conscience.

==== Internal arguments ====
A law which has not been promulgated is not a law in the full and strict sense, and does not impose an obligation. But when there is a solidly probable opinion in favour of liberty, the law has not been sufficiently promulgated, since there has not been the requisite manifestation of the mind of the legislator. Hence when there is a solidly probable opinion in favour of liberty, the law is not a law in the full and strict sense, and does not impose any obligation (cf. Lehmkuhl, Theologia Moralis, I, nn. 176–8). Æquiprobabilists reply that when there is a solidly probable opinion in favour of liberty, the law is probably not sufficiently promulgated, and the question remains whether a law that is probably not sufficiently promulgated imposes any obligation in conscience. It would be begging the question to assume that no obligation is imposed simply because there is a probability that the law has not been sufficiently promulgated. Moreover, if the safe opinion happens to be the true opinion, a material sin is committed by the person who, acting on probability, performs the prohibited action. But, unless the law is promulgated, a material sin cannot be committed by its violation, since promulgation is a necessary condition of a binding law (McDonald, The Principles of Moral Science, p. 245).

An obligation, concerning whose existence there is invincible ignorance, is no obligation. But, so long as there is a solidly probable opinion in favour of liberty, there is invincible ignorance about the obligation imposed by the law. Hence a law does not impose an obligation so long as the less safe opinion is solidly probable (cf. Lehmkuhl, "Theologia Moralis", I, n. 179). – Æquiprobabilists reply that there is not invincible ignorance in regard to a law when the safe opinion is also the more probable opinion, because in these circumstances a person is bound by ordinary prudence to give assent to the safe opinion. Although it is true that an obligation concerning whose existence there is invincible ignorance is no obligation, this is not true when one is compelled to give assent to an opinion as the more probable opinion (cf. Wouters, De Minusprobabilismo, p. 121).

According to the axiom: lex dubia non obligat, a doubtful law does not bind. But a law is doubtful when there is a solidly probable opinion against it. Hence it is lawful to follow a solidly probable opinion in favour of liberty (cf. Tanquerey, "Theologia Fundamentalis", n. 409). – Æquiprobabilists in reply say that the axiom lex dubia non obligat holds when the law is strictly doubtful, i.e. when the reasons for and against the law are equal or nearly equal. A fortiori the law does not bind when the safe opinion is more probable than the less safe opinion. It would, however, be begging the question to assume that the axiom holds when the less safe opinion is clearly less probable than the safe opinion.

According to Æquiprobabilists, it is lawful to follow the less safe opinion, when it is more probable than the safe opinion. But they must admit that probabilism is more probable than Æquiprobabilism, since the vast majority of theologians favour the milder view, and Æquiprobabilists do not reject external authority. Hence on their own principles they ought to admit the practical truth of probabilism. – Æquiprobabilists reply that extrinsic authority is of no avail when the arguments on which the authority rests have been proved to be invalid; and they claim that they have proved the invalidity of the probabilist arguments. Moreover, a reflex principle is useless unless its truth is proved with certainty, since its sole utility is to change speculative uncertainty into practical certainty. But greater probability does not give certainty. Accordingly, even if Æquiprobabilists were to admit the greater probability of probabilism, that admission would be useless for probabilists. The case is different with Æquiprobabilism which has practical certainty, since nearly all theologians nowadays admit the lawfulness of following the less safe opinion regarding the existence of a law, when it is equally or almost equally probable with the safe opinion.

Many probabilists lay stress on a practical argument in favour of their opinion, which is derived from the difficulty of distinguishing between various grades of Probability. It is impossible in practice, especially for ordinary people, to tell when one solidly probable opinion is more probable than another solidly probable opinion. But a moral system, to be of any serious utility, must be universal, so that not merely experts in moral science but also ordinary people can utilize it. Hence the systems which demand a knowledge of the various degrees of probability must be discarded as practically useless, and probabilism alone must be accepted as a working system. – Æquiprobabilists reply that their system merely asks, that if after due investigation it is found that the less safe opinion is notably and certainly less probable than the safe opinion, the law must be observed. The necessary investigation has frequently been already made by experts, and others, who are not experts, are safe in accepting the conclusions to which the experts adhere.

=== Arguments against probabilism ===
When the less safe opinion is notably and certainly less probable than the safe opinion, there is no true probability in favour of liberty, since the stronger destroy the force of the weaker reasons. Hence probabilists cannot consistently maintain that it is safe in practice to act on the less safe opinion which is also the less probable. – probabilists reply that the greater probability does not of necessity destroy the solid probability of the less probable opinion. When the foundations of the opposing probabilities are not derived from the same source, then at least the opposing arguments do not detract from one another; and even when the two probabilities are based on a consideration of the same argument, one opinion will retain probability insofar as the opposing opinion recedes from certainty.

A moral system, to be of any use, must be certain, since an uncertain reflex principle cannot give practical certainty. But probabilism is not certain, because it is rejected by all those theologians who upheld one or another of the opposing views. Hence probabilism cannot be accepted as a satisfactory solution of the question at issue. – Probabilists reply that their system can be of no use to those who do not look on it as certainly true; but the fact that many theologians do not accept it does not prevent its adherents from regarding it as certain, since these can and do believe that the arguments urged in its favour are insuperable.

Probabilism is seen by some Catholic authorities as an easy road to Laxism, because people are often inclined to regard opinions as really probable which are based on flimsy arguments, and because it is not difficult to find five or six serious authors who approve of opinions which right-minded men consider lax. They stress that the only sure way to safeguard Catholic morals is to reject the opinion which opens the way to Laxism. Probabilists reply that their system must be prudently employed, and that no serious danger of Laxism arises if it is recognized that an opinion is not solidly probable unless there are arguments in its favour which are sufficient to gain the assent of many prudent men. As for the authority of approved authors, it must be remembered that five or six grave authors do not give solid probability to an opinion unless they are notable for learning and prudence, and independently adhere to an opinion which has not been set aside by authoritative decisions or by unanswered arguments.

== See also ==
- Bayes' theorem
- Bayesian probability
- Development of doctrine
- Grammar of Assent
- Normative principle of worship
- Probabilism
