= Puritan Sabbatarianism =

Devotion of the entire Sabbath to worship and avoidance of recreational activities

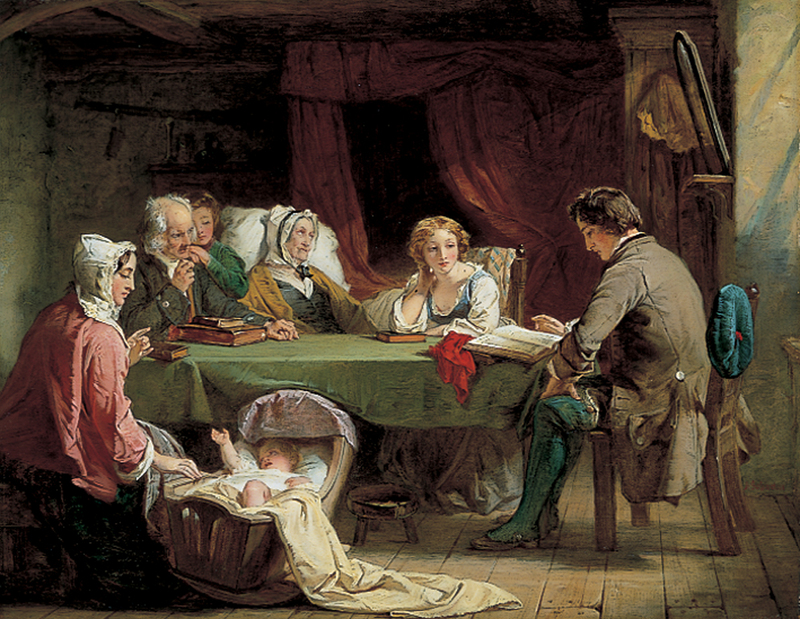
Sabbath Eve, painting by Alexander Johnston.

Puritan Sabbatarianism or Reformed Sabbatarianism, often just Sabbatarianism, is observance of Sabbath in Christianity that is typically characterised by devotion of the entire day to worship, and consequently the avoidance of recreational activities.

Unlike seventh-day Sabbatarians, Puritan Sabbatarians practice first-day Sabbatarianism (Sunday Sabbatarianism), keeping Sunday as Sabbath and referring to it as the Lord's Day. Puritan Sabbath, expressed in the Westminster Confession of Faith, is often contrasted with Continental Sabbath: the latter follows the Continental Reformed confessions, such as the Heidelberg Catechism, which emphasise rest and worship on the Lord's Day, but do not forbid recreational activities. However, John Calvin believed Christians were commanded to avoid recreation, as well as work, on Sunday to devote the day to worship, and during the seventeenth century there was consensus among continental as well as British Reformed theologians that the entire Sabbath was to be set aside for worship.

== Origins ==
While John Calvin's theology of the fourth commandment differed from that of the Puritans, he believed that Christians were commanded to cease from labor and recreation to devote the entire day to worship. The Genevan Consistory during the time of Calvin regularly interviewed people for working or engaging in recreation considered inappropriate for spiritual refreshment such as hunting, dancing, banqueting, playing tennis or billiards, or bowling skittles on Sundays.

During the Vestarian controversy, Reformers were spurred to develop the regulative principle of worship, a fundamental article that no corporate worship is permissible that does not have the sanction of Scripture, whether stated explicitly, or derived by a necessary deduction from Scripture. By the 17th century, Puritans had applied the regulative principle to devote first-day Sabbath entirely to God, indulging in neither the labors nor the recreations common to the other six days.

== History ==
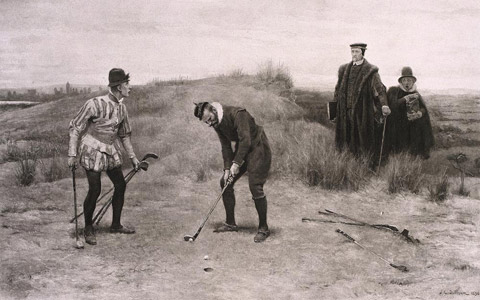
The Sabbath Breakers by J.C. Dollman.

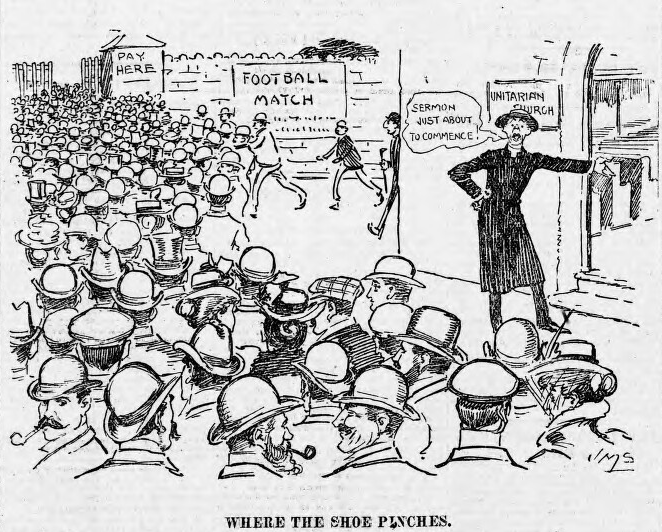
Satirical cartoon of 1899: a Welsh crowd choose to attend a rugby football game on a Sunday, despite the urging of a Unitarian preacher.

Sunday Sabbatarianism as jure divino or divinely ordained command, in contrast to non-Sabbatarian and antinomian reliance on Christian liberty, thus was a closely linked development to the regulative principle amongst English Protestants over the 17th century. Stricter observance of Lord's Day arose in England and Scotland, in reaction to the Prelatic laxity with which Sunday observance was customarily kept, which included recreations classified as lawful. Opposed also by seventh-day Sabbatarians John Traske, Theophilus Brabourne, and the Seventh Day Baptists, some Puritans stated that Sabbath was a proportion (one-seventh) rather than a particular day (either Saturday or Sunday), while others further specifically identified the first day as Christian Sabbath.

Though there are slight differences between confessional formulations of British and continental European Reformed churches, in the seventeenth century there came to be a consensus among the Reformed that the Sabbath should be devoted primarily to the worship of God.

Puritan Sabbatarianism is enshrined in its most mature expression, the Westminster Confession of Faith (1646), in the Calvinist theological tradition (Chapter 21, Of Religious Worship, and the Sabbath Day, sections 7–8):

7. As it is the law of nature, that, in general, a due proportion of time be set apart for the worship of God; so, in his Word, by a positive, moral, and perpetual commandment binding all men in all ages, he hath particularly appointed one day in seven, for a Sabbath, to be kept holy unto him: which, from the beginning of the world to the resurrection of Christ, was the last day of the week; and, from the resurrection of Christ, was changed into the first day of the week, which, in Scripture, is called the Lord’s day, and is to be continued to the end of the world, as the Christian Sabbath.
8. This Sabbath is then kept holy unto the Lord, when men, after a due preparing of their hearts, and ordering of their common affairs beforehand, do not only observe a holy rest, all the day, from their own works, words, and thoughts about their worldly employments and recreations, but also are taken up, the whole time, in the public and private exercises of his worship, and in the duties of necessity and mercy.

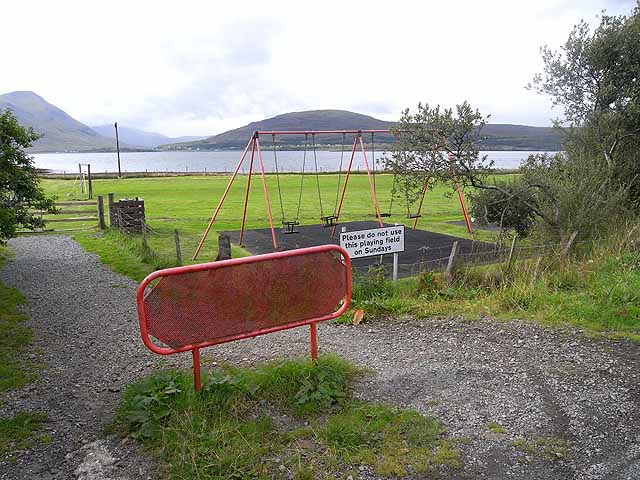
A recreation ground on Raasay displaying a sign "Please do not use this playing field on Sundays".

Jonathan Edwards delivered three sermons on The Perpetuity and Change of the Sabbath that are central to Puritan tradition. The first sermon emphasises Sabbath as an immutable, divine natural and positive law (as to proportion), while the second emphasises an alteration of "another law, which determined the beginning and ending of their working days" (as to order); the first day of creation is regarded as unknowable, and the weekday assigned to Sabbath regarded as not revealed until the Exodus. The third sermon regards the proper keeping of Sabbath: "We are strictly to abstain from being outwardly engaged in any worldly thing, either worldly business or recreations," because "the sabbath-day is an accepted time, a day of salvation, a time wherein God especially loves to be sought, and loves to be found."

Reformed Sabbatarian theologian G. I. Williamson accordingly suggests that "television, reading of newspapers and magazines, and engaging in sports and excursions ... are not proper to the Sabbath because 'Sabbath' means to cease from these things in order to give one day exclusively to worship and the reading of God's Word, etc." The cessation described entails all engrossing activities of the six days of the week, whether employment or recreations, and thus specifically excludes ceasing only from work while continuing favorite recreations. Williamson affirms striving toward holiness, calling it a lofty goal to avoid "even thoughts and words about our worldly employments or recreations."

Though modern expression of Puritan Sabbath has been caricatured as being boring, organisations that promote Sabbaths as joyous, delightful appointments include Day One Christian Ministries.

Historical theologian R. Scott Clark has criticized the idea that distinct "Puritan" and "Continental" views on the Sabbath exist, instead arguing that the Reformed have historically agreed that recreation is prohibited on Sunday.

In the United States throughout the nineteenth century, Protestant moralists organized the "Sabbath reform" that pushed for stricter Sunday keeping. Their efforts prompted the enforcement of Sunday laws (often called blue laws) that legally barred a variety of activities on Sundays. The enforcement of Sunday laws gave rise to substantial church-state debates as well as minority-rights movements fueled by the resistance of Jews, Seventh Day Baptists, Catholics, and other religious minorities.

== Civil Law ==
In 1671, the Province of Massachusetts Bay codified the following law with respect to the Sunday Sabbath in its charter:

That whosoever shall profane the Lords-day, by doing unnecessary servile work, by unnecessary travailing, or by sports and recreations, he or they that so transgress, shall forfeit for every such default forty shillings, or be publickly whipt: But if it clearly appear that the sin was profoundly, Presumptuously and with a high hand committed, against the known Command and Authority of the blessed God, such a person therein despising and reproaching the Lord, shall be put to death or grievously punished at the Judgement of the Court.

== See also ==
- Lord's Day
- Sabbath desecration
- Sabbath in Christianity
- Seventh Day Baptists
