= Moral Theology (Liguori) =

Multi-volume work by Alphonsus Liguori

Moral Theology (also known as the Theologia Moralis) is a nine-volume work concerning Catholic moral theology written between 1748 and 1785 by Alphonsus Liguori, a Catholic theologian and Doctor of the Church. This work is not to be confused with Theologia moralis universa ad mentem S. Alphonsi, a 19th-century treatise by Pietro Scavini written in the philosophical tradition of Alphonsus Liguori.

== Description ==
Nine editions of Moral Theology were published during the author's lifetime, the first of which was released in 1748 and consisted of annotations on a treatise called Medulla Theologiae Moralis by Hermann Busenbaum, a 17th-century Jesuit theologian. After the eighth edition in 1779, Alphonsus considered his work definitive, and in 1785 the ninth edition finalised the book's contents. Since his death, many further editions have been published, including a partially completed English edition from Mediatrix Press, the first volume of which was released in 2017.

The contents of each volume of Moral Theology are listed broadly below:

- Volume 1: Preface to the discourse (dissertatio prolegomena), on conscience, on laws, on the theological virtues, and on the first commandment
- Volume 2: On commandments II, III, IV, V, VI, IX and VII, on justice and laws, and on restitution
- Volume 3: On contracts, on commandments VIII, IX (again) and X, on the precepts of the church, and on the precepts of the individual
- Volume 4: On the canonical hours, on human actions, on sins, on the sacraments in general, and on Baptism and Confirmation
- Volume 5: On the Eucharist, on the sacrifice of the mass, and on Penance
- Volume 6: On Penance (continued), on Extreme Unction, on Holy Orders, and on Matrimony
- Volume 7: On Matrimony (continued), and on judgments and irregularities
- Volume 8: On the practice of confessions, examination of ordinands, summary of moral doctrines and canons from the works of Benedict XIV
- Volume 9: Episcopal decrees, appendices, general index

== See also ==
- Aequiprobabilism
- Catholic moral theology
