= Redemptoristines =

Female contemplative religious order of the Catholic Church

The Order of the Most Holy Redeemer (Latin: Ordo Sanctissimi Redemptoris; abbreviated OSsR), also commonly known as the Redemptoristines, is a female contemplative religious order of the Catholic Church. It was formed in 1731, and is the female counterpart to the Redemptorists.

== History ==
Maria Celeste Crostarosa, the foundress of the order

The cradle of the Redemptoristines is Scala, not far from Amalfi, Italy. Thomas Falcoia, of the Congregation Pii Operarii, formed a community of nuns there and gave them a rule. Later he became Bishop of Castellammare. He was director of Alphonsus Liguori when a new rule was said to have been revealed to Maria Celeste Crostarosa in a vision.

The bishop favoured the rule and asked Alphonsus to give the nuns the spiritual exercises and to organize the community as he judged best. The congregation was founded as an order of contemplative nuns. Alphonsus set up observance of the new rule by meditation on the life and virtues of Christ. The details of their daily life were to commemorate phases of His life. When the Redemptorists were founded just a few years later, the nuns committed to praying in a special way for their apostolic works.

The institute began on 23 May 1731. A second monastery was founded by Alphonsus, when bishop, in his episcopal city, Sant'Agata de' Goti. The rule was approved by Benedict XIV in 1750.

Nearly a hundred years after the foundation at Scala, Joseph Passerat sent Eugénie Dijon and the Countess Welsersheim to Sant'Agata dei Goti to learn the rule and spirit of the Redemptoristines. They received the habit at Rome from Cardinal Carlo Odescalchi. They founded houses at Vienna and Bruges.

== Present day ==
As of 2021, there are forty monasteries and communities of the institute in Angola, Argentina, Austria, Australia, Brazil, Burkina-Faso, Canada, Columbia, France, Germany, Haiti, Ireland, Italy, Japan, Kazakhstan, Mexico, the Netherlands, Peru, the Philippines, Poland, Slovakia, Spain, Thailand, the United States, and Venezuela. Community life is centered around the celebration of Mass and the liturgy of the hours. Part of their support derives from sewing ceremonial capes for the Knights and Ladies of the Holy Sepulcher.

The first Redemptoristines monastery in the United States, Our Mother of Perpetual Help, was established in 1957 on the grounds of the Redemptorists' seminary of Mount St. Alphonsus, in Esopus, New York. When the property was sold, the nuns relocated to Beacon, New York where they share a monastery with the Carmelites.

In São Fidélis, Brazil, there still exists a traditional monastery of the Redemptoristines that continues the original Rules and Constitutions with the approval of the Holy See.

== Habit ==
Their traditional habit is deep red, and the scapular and choir-mantle blue; on the scapular there is a coloured medallion of Christ the Redeemer. The 15-decade rosary hangs at the side bearing a medal upon one side of which are embossed the emblems of the Passion of Jesus. The nuns wear two veils: one white and another black, folded back over the head, but which may be drawn forward over the face and as far as the medallion on the scapular. Some houses wear a modified habit of a red dress, a black veil and a medal of Christ the Redeemer on one side and Alphonsus Liguori on the other that is suspended on a chain.
