= Probabilism =

Ancient Greek doctrine of academic skepticism

In theology and philosophy, probabilism (from Latin probare, to test, approve) is an ancient Greek doctrine of academic skepticism. It holds that in the absence of certainty, plausibility or truth-likeness is the best criterion. The term can also refer to a 17th-century religious thesis about ethics, or a modern physical–philosophical thesis.

== Philosophy ==
=== Ancient ===
In ancient Greek philosophy, probabilism referred to the doctrine which gives assistance in ordinary matters to one who is skeptical in respect of the possibility of real knowledge: it supposes that though knowledge is impossible, a man may rely on strong beliefs in practical affairs. This view was held by the skeptics of the New Academy. Academic skeptics accept probabilism, while Pyrrhonian skeptics do not.

=== Modern ===
In modern usage, a probabilist is someone who believes that central epistemological issues are best approached using probabilities. This thesis is neutral with respect to whether knowledge entails certainty or whether skepticism about knowledge is true.

Probabilist doctrines continue to be debated in the context of artificial general intelligence, as a counterpoint to the use of non-monotonic logic, as the proper form for knowledge representation remains unclear.

== Theology ==
In moral theology, especially Catholic, it refers especially to the view in casuistry that in difficult matters of conscience one may safely follow a doctrine that is probable, for example is approved by a recognized Doctor of the Church, even if the opposite opinion is more probable.

This view was advanced by members of the School of Salamanca, such as the Spanish theologian Bartolomé de Medina (1527–1581) and defended by many Jesuits. The first mentions of the view can be found in the works of Francisco de Vitoria and Alonso de la Vera Cruz. It was heavily criticised by Blaise Pascal in his Provincial Letters and by St. Alphonsus Ligourí in his Theologia Moralis, as leading to moral laxity. Opposed to probabilism is probabiliorism (Latin probabilior, "more likely"), which holds that when there is a preponderance of evidence on one side of a controversy one is obliged to follow that side, and tutiorism (Latin tutior, "safer"), which holds that in case of doubt one must take the morally safer side. A more radical view, "minus probabilissimus", holds that an action is permissible if a single opinion allowing that action is available, even if the overwhelming weight of opinion proscribes it.

The doctrine became particularly popular at the start of the 17th century, as it could be used to support almost any position. By mid-century, such thinking, termed Laxism, was recognized as scandalous.

== See also ==
- Compensationism
- Determinism
- Equiprobabilism
- Indeterminism
- Ontology
- Probability

== Sources ==
- J. Franklin, The Science of Conjecture: Evidence and Probability Before Pascal (Johns Hopkins University Press, 2001), ch. 4
