= Joseph Passerat =

French Redemptorist

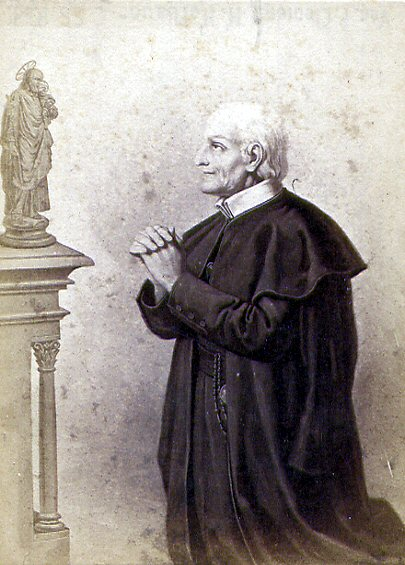
Joseph Passerat

Joseph-Amand Passerat (born 30 April 1772, at Joinville, France; died 30 October 1858 in Tournai, Belgium) was a French Redemptorist. He was declared Servant of God in 1893 and confirmed as a Venerable in 1980.

== Life ==
Passerat was driven from the seminary, imprisoned, and forced to serve in Napoleon's army from 1788 to 1792. Owing to his height he was made drum-major, and later quarter-master. At the first opportunity he left the service and entered the Congregation of the Most Holy Redeemer in Warsaw.

Clement Hofbauer trained him for the religious life and the priesthood, and he in turn trained newcomers. Later with great difficulty owing to the circumstances of the times he established houses outside of Poland.

After the death of Hofbauer, Passerat succeeded him as vicar-general over all the transalpine communities (that is, the communities outside of Italy, where the Congregation originated). While thus engaged (1820–48) he founded houses in Bavaria, Prussia, Switzerland, Belgium, France, Portugal, Holland, and England. Passerat sent the first six Redemptorists to the U.S. in 1832. Difficulties were many in the United States, and in Europe the danger of suppression was imminent. He used to say: "Console yourselves, we are seed, be it that we are reduced to ten, these like grains of corn reduced to dust under the earth will one day give a rich harvest".

On 6 April 1848, he was driven out of Vienna with his community. After much hardship he reached Belgium. He resigned his office and became director of the Redemptoristines in Bruges. In 1850 he joined the convent of redemptorists in Tournai, where he died in 1858.

The process for his beatification began in 1892. His spiritual writings were approved by theologians on 9 August 1896, and his cause was formally opened on 13 May 1901, granting him the title of Servant of God. In 1980, Pope John Paul II declared him Venerable.

== Literature ==
- Achille Desurmont, Joseph Passerat et sous sa conduite les Redemptoristes pendant les guerres de l'Empire, Montreuil-sur-Mer, 1893.
- H. Giourille, Un grand serviteur de Dieu, Le Rev. Père Joseph Passerat, Montreuil-sur-Mer, 1893.
- John Magnier, Venerable Joseph Passerat, The Catholic Encyclopedia Vol. 11, New York, 1911.
- H. Giourille, Vie du Vénérable père Joseph Paaserat, Paris, Pierre Téqui, 1924.
- Madeleine Gautron, L’âme du Père Passerat, 1929.
- Pierre Debongnie, Joseph-Amand Passerat, supérieur des Rédemptoristes transalpins 1772-1858: un juste proscrit, Brugge, DDB, 1938.
- R. P. Pelissier, Le Père Passerat, Un sillage de feu, Apôtre du Foyer, 1949.
