= The Glories of Mary =

18th century book of Roman Catholic Mariology

The Glories of Mary (Italian: Le glorie di Maria) is a classic book in the field of Catholic Mariology, written during the 18th century by Saint Alphonsus Liguori, a Doctor of the Church.

== Description ==
The book was written in part as a defense of Marian devotion at a time when it had come under criticism. The book combines numerous citations in favor of devotion to the Blessed Virgin Mary from the Church Fathers and the Doctors of the Church with Saint Alphonsus' own personal views on Marian veneration and includes a number of Marian prayers and practices.

The first part of the book focuses on the Salve Regina (Hail Holy Queen) and explains that God gave Mary to mankind as the "Gate of Heaven". On this topic, St. Alphonsus quoted Saint Bonaventure, "No one can enter Heaven unless by Mary, as though through a door."

The second part of the book deals with the key Marian feasts such as the Immaculate Conception, Nativity, Purification, Annunciation, Assumption, etc. The third part focuses on the Seven Sorrows of Mary, explaining how her "prolonged martyrdom" was greater than that of all other martyrs. The fourth part discusses ten different virtues of the Blessed Virgin, while the fifth part provides a collection of Marian prayers, meditations and devotions.

=== Co-Redemptrix ===
Alphonsus Liguori speaks of Co-Redemption without ever mentioning the title of Co-Redemptrix, even though he cites a work in which it appears explicitly, Delle grandezze di Gesù Cristo e della gran Madre Maria SS., Lezioni sacre (On the Greatness of Jesus Christ and the Great Mother Mary Most Holy, Sacred Lessons), written by the Jesuit Francesco Pepe. The title of Co-Redemptrix also appears in the later text entitled Opera dogmatica contra gli eretici pretesi riformati (Dogmatic Work Against the So-Called Reformed Heretics, 1770).
