= Giulia Crostarosa =

Italian Roman Catholic nun

Blessed Giulia (Maria Celeste) Crostarosa
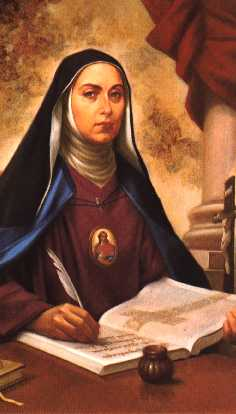
- Devotional print c. 1910.

Religious; Mystic
- Born: 31 October 1696; Naples, Kingdom of Naples
- Died: 14 September 1755 (aged 58); Foggia, Kingdom of Naples
- Venerated in: Roman Catholic Church
- Beatified: 18 June 2016, Foggia, Italy by Cardinal Angelo Amato
- Feast: 11 September
- Attributes: Religious habit; Pendant of Jesus
- Patronage: Redemptoristine Nuns

Giulia Crostarosa (31 October 1696 – 14 September 1755) was an Italian Roman Catholic nun who founded the Order of the Most Holy Redeemer (Redemptoristines), an order of contemplative nuns. Her founding of the Redemptoristines was the culmination of mystical visions and her devotion to the way of life they showed her. She assumed the religious name of "Maria Celeste" when she became a professed nun. She was also instrumental in encouraging Alphonsus Liguori to found the Congregation of the Most Holy Redeemer (Redemptorists), a missionary order of priests and brothers.

Pope Francis declared her to be Venerable for her life of heroic virtue on 3 June 2013; a miracle attributed to her intercession was approved in 2015 which paved the path for her beatification, which took place on 18 June 2016 in Foggia with Cardinal Angelo Amato presiding on the behalf of the pope.

== Life ==
Giulia Crostarosa was born on 31 October 1696 in Naples with the baptismal name of Giulia Marcella Crostarosa. She was the tenth of twelve children born to Francesco Crostarosa and Paola Battistini Caldari; descended from the Lords of Abruzzo and Aquila.

Maria Celeste Crostarosa, the foundress of the Redemptoristines.

Crostarosa was immersed in spiritual life and collaborated with Father Bartolomeo Cacace who served as her spiritual director. As a young woman, she accompanied her sister Ursula to Marigliano to become a Carmelite nun in 1718, taking the name "Candida". While there, she met Father Thomas Falcoia of the Pious Workers, who served as her spiritual director following the death of Cacace. She remained in the convent for under a decade and in 1724 relocated along with her sister to enter a religious conservatory founded by Falcoia in Scala, high above the Bay of Amalfi. At the new convent, she changed her religious name to "Maria Celeste".

=== The founding of the Redemptoristines ===
Her first recorded vision of Jesus Christ was on 25 April 1725 when she was still a novice, seeing him "...in a wonderfully pure light... with an inexpressible jubilation of love... In a great and very clear light I saw him write with his finger in my heart with his blood." The vision showed her for the first time the congregation of nuns she was to found, whose mission would be to remind the world of what Jesus had done, and revealed to her a particular rule of life that the nuns were to follow. Crostarosa wrote down the rule and showed it to Falcoia, the director of the convent. Falcoia, like the other superiors and priests who would become involved, had to consider whether this revelation seemed genuinely divine or was the product of delusions. He submitted the new Rule to a number of theologians, who approved of it, and said it might be adopted in the convent of Scala, provided the community would accept it. However, the mother superior objected, so Falcoia's general superior forbade any change of rule and removed Falcoia from all communication with the convent. Crostarosa had support from some of her fellow nuns during this time, but she also faced punitive measures from superiors, such as being forbidden from taking communion for a few weeks, being exiled to the convent's attic, or having to eat meals sitting on the floor with a rope around her neck.

Just a few years later, in October 1730, Falcoia was consecrated bishop of nearby Castellamare, and was thus free from the oversight of the superior general of the Pious Workers with respect to the convent, although the convent itself was still subject to authority of its local bishop, Nicola Guerriero. As it happened, Bishop Guerriero had invited the young Alphonsus Liguori, a friend of Falcoia, to give a retreat to the nuns at Scala. Liguori had heard negative rumors of the "visionary nun" at Scala, but he spoke to her at length during the retreat, and came away with a favorable impression from her and from the other nuns' support of her. Crostarosa thus had the support of both Falcoia and Liguori, and Liguori took the initiative in persuading Guerriero. With Guerrierro's approval, and the unanimous consent of the nuns, the convent would switch to rule of life from Crostarosa's vision on the following Pentecost, 31 May 1731. They chose a habit of red and blue, the traditional colours of Our Lord's own clothes.

=== Encouraging the founding of the Redemptorists ===
Crostarosa also became a close friend of Alphonsus Liguori, keeping touch with him via letters between his visits to the convent at Scala. Her letters, and the Autobiography she wrote later in life, reflect that she had mystical visions with some regularity, and on 3 October 1731, she had one which featured Liguori. It was the eve of the feast day of St. Francis of Assisi, and in her vision, Jesus showed her Liguori standing with him and St. Francis in an "aura of glory;" Crostarosa was told in the vision that Liguori would be the founder of a new congregation of men. The next day, she had another vision about this congregation that emphasized the proclamation of the gospel to the whole world. She would share the content of these visions with Falcoia, their common friend and patron, who in turn demanded that Liguori do as the vision said.

To Liguori, it was very much in line with desires he already had to go beyond the city of Naples in his work as a priest. The much-higher number of priests in large cities at the time meant that the rural poor received comparatively little benefit from the ministries of the Church. He was torn, however, by his scrupulous self-doubt and his general exhaustion from the projects he had already taken on. When Crostarosa spoke to him about the visions during his next visit, she met his demurrals with insistence. She believed it was as genuine as her first visions, and consequently was God's will. Liguori consulted many other advisors and friends about it, including Falcoia, but Crostarosa's words imparted special urgency, and he ultimately trusted her visions. By March of 1732, Liguori was persuaded. The new order, the Congregation of the Most Holy Redeemer, or Redemptorists, was officially begun on 9 November 1732, with Bishop Falcoia as its director.

=== Conflict with Falcoia and departure from Scala ===
Although Falcoia was an enthusiastic supporter for Sister Crostarosa, he also tended to be controlling and patronizing. For the most part, she bore with him in good humor and with humility. The Rule of her order, however, would become a serious point of contention. The nuns viewed Crostarosa as their visionary founder, but Falcoia had official authority as their director and prestige as a bishop. In one reported instance, not long after the new Rule was adopted, Falcoia had taken all extant copies of the rule that Crostarosa had written down. When the nuns asked for one, he replied, "I need them. I am keeping them. She can draw up another copy." Sister Crostarosa was distressed at the thought of asking God to inspire her to again; nevertheless, she had a vision one night soon after of Jesus comforting her, and in the morning she wrote down a new copy of the rule.

A result of this episode, or something like it, is that Falcoia added many of his own ideas to the rule of life of the new order, citing his authority as their director. Falcoia had a similar attitude towards Liguori's congregation, which proved divisive in the Redemptorists' first year, and Crostarosa's letters show that she was initially more upset at Falcoia about the men's situation than her own, and more upset than Liguori was. Liguori was inclined to defer to Falcoia for the sake of canonical obedience, and he chided Sister Crostarosa to do the same; this damaged their friendship rather than persuade her.

To the nuns, Falcoia continued to insist that his revised version of the rule was "substantially the same" as the one Crostarosa was inspired to write. Around March 1733, when it became clear that Crostarosa would continue to resist his leadership, Falcoia told Liguori to bring the nuns back in line. Crostarosa noted of Liguori: "He was a little heavy-handed." She gave Liguori short and curt replies, but in her Autobiography she described this time as a "shipwreck." Falcoia gave her a set of ultimatums (Note: Falcoia's demands were 1) to cease writing letters to Father Silvestro Tosquez, an early Redemptorist who was then her spiritual director, and who generally took Crostarosa's side in these arguments, 2) to put her signature on Falcoia's version of the rule, and 3) to take him back as her own spiritual director. All three were overbearing and unreasonable by contemporary standards.), threatening to expel her from the convent, and Crostarosa refused, particularly being no longer able to trust him as a spiritual director. She left the convent at Scala on 25 May 1733, together with her two biological sisters, Maria Illuminata and Maria Evangelista.

=== The Redemptoristines in Foggia ===
Crostarosa went to Nocera Inferiore and joined a conservatory of Dominican nuns. The local bishop, Nicola de Dominicis, thought much better of her than Falcoia did, and soon appointed her superior there. In Foggia, on 19 March 1738, she was able to establish her own convent, again following the original rule of the Redemptoristine nuns. She served as the order's superior for under two decades. Liguori continued to hold her in high esteem, and their friendship gradually recovered. She also became friends with other Redemptorists, including Gerard Majella.

Maria Celeste Crostarosa died in Foggia on 14 September 1755. Her spiritual experiences are contained in numerous documents of considerable value following her death as well as those she kept during her life.

== Beatification process ==
Crostarosa's spiritual writings were approved by theologians on 11 December 1895. The beatification process opened in Foggia on 11 August 1901, granting her the title of Servant of God. Pope Francis approved the findings of the Congregation for the Causes of Saints and proclaimed her to be Venerable on 3 June 2013 on the account of her heroic virtues.

A miracle attributed to her intercession was investigated on a local level and was validated on 6 December 2013. The pope approved the miracle on 14 December 2015. Cardinal Angelo Amato presided over the beatification on 18 June 2016 in Foggia on the pope's behalf.
