= Aequiprobabilism =

Aequiprobabilism, also spelled æquiprobabilism or equiprobabilism, is one of several systems in moral theology.

== Teaching ==
1. If the opinions for and against the current existence of a law have equal or nearly equal probabilities, it is permissible to act on the less safe opinion.
2. If the opinions for and against the cessation of a previously existing law have equal or nearly equal probabilities, then it is not permissible to act on the less safe opinion.
3. If the safe opinion is certainly more probable than the less safe opinion, then it is unlawful to follow the less safe opinion.

With the first of these propositions Probabilists agree—but they deny the truth of the second and third propositions (cf. Marc, "Institutiones Morales", I, nn. 91-103).

== Arguments for Æquiprobabilism ==
In proof of their first proposition, Æquiprobabilists quote, among other things, the axiom: in dubio melior est condition possidentis. When the doubt regards the existence, as distinguished from the cessation of a law, liberty is in possession and accordingly the opinion which favours liberty can be followed in practice.

In proof of their second proposition, Æquiprobabilists quote the same axiom: in pari delicto melior est conditio possidentis. When the doubt concerns the cessation of a law, the law is in possession, and therefore the law must be observed until it is displaced by a stronger probability in favour of liberty. Probabilists reply to this argument that liberty is always in possession, since law and obligation presuppose liberty in the subject.

In proof of the third proposition Æquiprobabilists put forward various arguments, of which the following are the most forcible:

A person is bound to endeavour to bring his actions into harmony with objective morality. But a person who follows the less probable opinion in favour of liberty fails to observe this dictate of prudence, and consequently acts unlawfully (cf. Wouters "De Minusprobabilismo", p. 71). Probabilists reply that this argument would end in Rigorism if carried to its logical conclusion. Because the only way efficiently to bring our actions into perfect harmony with objective morality is to follow the safe opinion so long as the less safe opinion has not acquired moral certainty. This is the only way of preventing all serious danger of committing material sin and consequently is the only way of observing perfect harmony with objective morality. However, since Rigorism is universally condemned, the argument must be rejected, and the principles of Probabilism must be adopted which hold that it is sufficient to observe harmony with objective morality insofar as this is known with moral certainty (cf. Lehmkuhl, "Theologia Moralis", I, n. 191).

On 26 June 1680 the Holy Office, under the presidency of Innocent XI, issued, in connection with the teaching of Thyrsus Gonzalez, S.J., a Decree of which the authentic text was published 19 April 1902, by the Secretary of the Holy Office. So much controversy has recently arisen in regard to the value of decree, that it is advantageous to quote the whole text: "A report having been made by Father Laurea of the contents of a letter directed by Father Thyrsus Gonzalez, S.J., to Our Most Holy Lord; the Most Eminent Lords said that the Secretary of State must write to the Apostolic Nuncio of the Spains [directing him] to signify to the said Father Thyrsus that His Holiness, having received his letter favourably, and having read it with approval, has commanded that he [Thyrsus] shall freely and fearlessly preach, teach, and defend with his pen the more probable opinion, and also manfully attack the opinion of those who assert that in a conflict of a less probable opinion with a more probable, known and estimated as such, it is allowed to follow the less probable; and to inform him that whatever he does and writes on behalf of the more probable opinion will be pleasing to His Holiness. - Let it be enjoined upon the Father General of the Society of Jesus, as by order [de ordine] of His Holiness, not only to permit the Fathers of the Society to write in favour of the more probable opinion and to attack the opinion of those who assert that in a conflict of a less probable opinion with a more probable, known and estimated as such, it is allowed to follow the less probable- but also to write to all the Universities of the Society [informing them] that it is the mind of His Holiness that whosoever chooses may freely write in favour of the more probable opinion, and may attack the aforesaid contrary [opinion]; and to order them to submit entirely to the command of His Holiness." Æquiprobabilists say that in this Decree there is a clear expression of the mind of Innocent XI about the morality of teaching that it is permissible to act on the less safe opinion when the safe opinion is certainly more probable. The pope disapproves of this teaching, commends Father Gonzalez for his opposition to it, and orders the General of the Jesuits to allow full liberty so that anyone who pleases may write against it. Probabilists reply that, though Innocent XI was opposed to Probabilism, his official Decree merely commanded that liberty of teaching be allowed to the members of the order. Moreover, they point out that Gonzalez was not an Æquiprobabilist, but a Probabiliorist of a strict type whom St. Alphonsus Liguori regarded as an extremist.

== See also ==
- Compensationism
- Probabiliorism
- Equiprobable
