= Achille Desurmont =

French Redemptorist ascetical writer

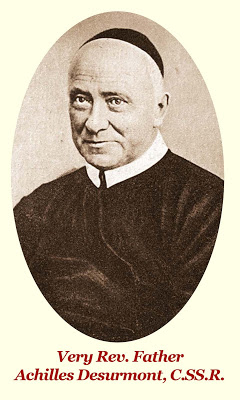
Achille Desurmont's Portrait

Achille Desurmont (b. at Tourcoing, France, 23 December 1828; d. 23 July 1898) was a French Redemptorist ascetical writer.

== Life ==
He attended first the college of the Jesuits at Brugelette, Belgium, and afterwards (1848) the theological college of Cambrai. Drawn to the religious state, he was received into the Congregation of the Most Holy Redeemer in 1850, made his profession the following year, and was ordained priest 24 September 1853.

He was appointed prefect of students and professor of theology, which offices he retained until 1865, when he became superior of the French province. Under his care subjects and foundations multiplied; the congregation spread into Spain for a second time, and he made foundations in Peru, Ecuador, Chile, and Colombia in South America.

He was forced to transfer his numerous religious from France to the Netherlands. On his return to France he soon organized missions and retreats as before. In 1887, he was given the work of Apostolic visitor to the Little Sisters of the Poor. At the age of seventy he was again nominated provincial. Although in poor health, he set to work, but the result was a complete break-down.

== Works ==
He was the founder (1875) of the ascetical review, La Sainte Famille, and a constant contributor to it. His works are edited in three series:

=== Vie Chrétienne ===
- L'Art d' assurer son Salut
- Le Credo et la Providence
- Le Monde et l'Evangile
- La Vie vraiment chrétienne
- Dévotions de l'âme chrétienne
- Le Vén. Passarat et les Rédemptoristes

=== Vie Religieuse ===
- Exercises Spirituels (Retraites)
- Renouvellements spirituels (Retraites)
- Conversion quotidienne et retour continuel à Dieu (Retraites)
- Une Vertu pour chaque mois de l'année
- La Vie vraiment religieuse
- Manuel de méditations quotidiennes

=== Vie Sacerdotale ===
- Dieu et la parole de Dieu
- Discours et plans de retraites ecclésiastiques
- L'esprit Apostolique
- L'art de sauver les âmes
- La charité sacerdotale (Paris, Libraire de la "Sainte Famille", 1907–8)
