= Laloux =

Laloux is a surname. Notable people with the surname include:

- André Laloux (1897–1985), Belgian tennis player
- Éléonore Laloux, French politician and activist
- René Laloux (tennis) (1895–1981), Belgian tennis player
- René Laloux (1929–2004), French animator, screenwriter and film director
- Victor Laloux (1850–1937), French architect and teacher
- Frederic Laloux, French economist who coined the term Teal organisation
