= Compensationism =

Theological concept

Compensationism is one of several theological doctrines, opposed to Probabilism.

== Doctrine ==
Compensationism maintains that a doubtful law is not devoid of all binding force, and that there must be a compensating reason, proportionate to the probability and gravity of the law, to justify the performance of the action which is probably forbidden. This teaching is based on an analogy with an act which has two effects, one good and the other bad. It is not lawful to perform such an act unless there is a justifying cause proportionate to the evil. In the case of a doubtful law the bad effect is the danger of material sin, and the good effect is the benefit, which arises from the performance of the action which is probably forbidden. Hence in this as in the former case, a compensating cause, proportionate to the probable evil, is required to justify the performance of the action.

Probabilists reply that this moral system leads to Tutiorism, because it implies that if no compensating benefit exists, it is not lawful to perform an action so long as it certainly is not forbidden. Again, Probabilists say that the preservation of liberty is of itself a sufficient compensating reason when there is question of a law which is not certain. Finally, Probabilists are prepared to admit that, as a point of expediency though not of obligation, it is advisable to look for a compensating cause over and above the preservation of liberty when a confessor is directing penitents in the use of probable opinions. If no such compensating reason exists, the penitent can be advised, though not under pain of sin, to abstain from the performance of the action which is probably forbidden.

== See also ==
- Æquiprobabilism
- Probabiliorism
