= G. I. Williamson =

American theologian (1925–2023)

- Born: Gerald Irvin Williamson; May 19, 1925; Des Moines, Iowa, U.S.
- Died: April 12, 2023 (aged 97)
- Education: Bachelor of Divinity
- Alma mater: Hope College; Drake University; Pittsburgh Theological Seminary
- Occupation(s): Pastor, author

Gerald Irvin Williamson (May 19, 1925 – April 12, 2023) was an American Reformed theologian, pastor, and author.

== Biography ==
G. I. Williamson was a Christian minister for fifty years. He retired from the Orthodox Presbyterian Church ministry in 2011. Having learned to play clarinet and saxophone because of his enthusiasm for the music of famous dance bands such as Glenn Miller and the Dorsey brothers, Tommy and Jimmy he became a professional musician. After serving in the army during World War II and while working as a dance hall musician, Williamson converted to Christianity at age 21. He attended Hope College in Holland, Michigan, for one year and then transferred to Drake University in Des Moines, Iowa. He graduated from Drake in 1949.

In 1952, he earned a B.D. from Pittsburgh-Xenia Theological Seminary under John Gerstner. He served in various positions as a pastor for fifty years including two terms as a minister in the Reformed Churches of New Zealand.

While in New Zealand he served in Māngere (one of three congregations in Auckland. The Mangere congregation has since ceased to exist by that name) and Silverstream (a congregation in the Wellington region). He was twice elected as Moderator of the Synod (1965 and 1977). His clarity of thinking and teaching was greatly appreciated by Reformed Churches of New Zealand congregations throughout the country.

Williamson was ordained in the Orthodox Presbyterian Church. From 1992 through 2005 Williamson edited 'Ordained Servant', a journal published by the OPC for church officers.

Williamson was the author of several books on Reformed theology, including study guides for the Westminster Confession of Faith, The Westminster Shorter Catechism, and the Heidelberg Catechism as well as studies in Apologetics (Understanding the Times) and Eschatology (A Study of Biblical Eschatology). This last book has been reproduced at the Center for Reformed Theology and Apologetics along with an article on Ethics. He was an outspoken young earth creationist. He wrote in the Aquila Report an exposition of Hebrews 11:1-3 to show how the author sets forth a six-day creation and in the same magazine for September 16, 2013: "It’s my conviction that we in the Presbyterian and Reformed community have lost credibility with respect to this ..." He was also a defender of the Regulative Principle of Worship.

Williamson died on April 12, 2023, at the age of 97.
