= Bartolomé de Medina (theologian) =

Spanish theologian

Bartolomé de Medina O.P.
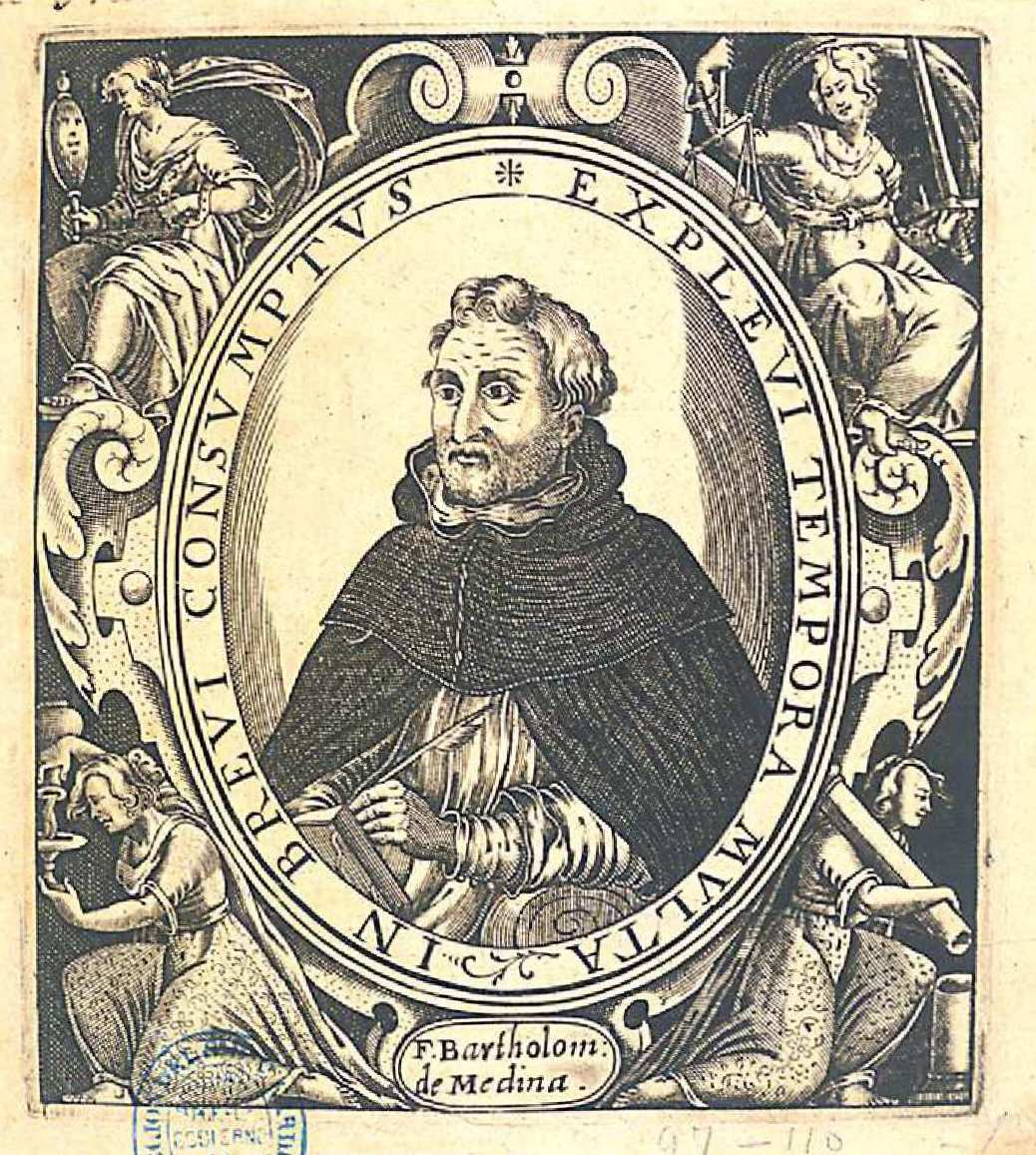
- Born: 1527; Medina de Rioseco, Crown of Castile
- Died: 31 December 1580 (aged 53); Salamanca, Crown of Castile

Education
- Education: University of Salamanca

Philosophical work
- Era: 16th-century philosophy
- Region: Western philosophy; Spanish philosophy
- School: Scholasticism; Thomism; School of Salamanca
- Institutions: University of Salamanca
- Main interests: Moral theology, Thomism
- Notable ideas: Probabilism

Bartolomé de Medina (1527–1580) was a Spanish Dominican Catholic theologian and a member of the School of Salamanca. He is best known as the first prominent formulator of the doctrine of probabilism in moral theology.

Born in Medina de Rioseco, Spain, he entered the Dominican Order and a studied theology under Francisco de Vitoria, Domingo de Soto, and Melchor Cano at the University of Salamanca. He spent the majority of his career teaching at Salamanca, first as the chair of Durandus and later in the principal chair of theology after winning a public contest against the Augustinian Juan de Guevara. His surviving writings are commentaries on Thomas Aquinas' Summa Theologica.

== Biography ==
Medina studied theology at the University of Salamanca under the celebrated professor Francisco de Vitoria. His life was devoted almost entirely to teaching theology at Salamanca, first in the chair of Durandus, afterwards as principal professor. He was appointed to the "cathedra primaria" after a successful concursus, in public, against the learned Augustinian scholar Juan de Guevara (1518–1600). He died in Salamanca in 1580.

Although he was well versed in Greek and Hebrew, devoted his life almost entirely to teaching theology, and all his writings preserved are theological, being principally commentaries on the Summa Theologica of St. Thomas.

== Work ==
Medina's principal works are commentaries on Thomas Aquinas. He was the first prominent exponent (and possibly the first exponent) of the doctrine of probabilism, which he sets out in his commentary on the ‘Prima secundae’ of Thomas Aquinas (1572). Medina's probabilist doctrine consisted of the contention that if two opinions are probable in unequal degree, the less probable may be followed (Si est opinio probabilis, licitum est eam sequi, licet opposita probabilior sit); in moral theology, the consequence of probabilism is that if the licitness of an action is in doubt, it is lawful to choose a probable opinion favouring liberty rather than a more probable opinion favouring the law. This doctrine was soon adopted by other Dominicans, notably Domingo Báñez, and the notion of the probable was elaborated by Jesuits as well as Dominicans; eventually, Jesuits became the principal proponents of the doctrine and Dominicans its principal opponents.

== Sources ==
- Franklin, James (2001). The Science of Conjecture: Evidence and Probability Before Pascal. Baltimore: Johns Hopkins University Press. p. 74-76. ISBN 0-8018-6569-7.
