= Conrad Koellin =

German Dominican theologian

Conrad Koellin (Latin, Conradus Koellin; 1476–1536) was a Dominican, professor of theology, and commentator on St. Thomas Aquinas.

== Life ==
Conrad was born in Ulm in 1476. He entered the Dominican Order in 1492, and professed the following year. During his formative years he reports that he studied Capreolus. He entered the University of Heidelberg in 1500, and in 1507 became a master of theology, and commenced lectures on Thomas Aquinas. It was here that he wrote his line-by-line commentary on the Prima Secundae of Thomas's Summa Theologica. On July 1, 1511, he took the position of master of theology at Cologne. In 1512, at the request of the factulies of both Heidelberg and Cologne, and with the permission of Thomas Cajetan—then Master General of the Order—, this commentary was published at Cologne under the title of Expositio Comentaria . . . in Primam Secundae etc..

He was also part of the Catholic response to the Lutherans, publishing two long works against Lutheranism, and participating as part of the Imperial party at Augsburg, where he was selected to help refute the Augsburg Confession. Of note, he also served as inquisitor in Mainz, Trier, and Cologne from 1528 until his death; he died in Cologne.

== Influence ==
Cajetan himself acknowledge that he valued Koellin's work, while he was heavily cited by later Thomists, including Bellarmine, Báñez, Suárez, Alvarez, Sylvius, John of St. Thomas, and the Salmanticenses. The reformers also called him a "distinguished Thomist."

Hennessey says that he was, "probably the most important Catholic theologian in Germany at the time of the Reformation," while Janz more moderately says that he was, "the most important Thomas-commentator in Germany before Cajetan," and adds that under him, "the influence of Capreolus' Defensiones reached its high point in the Thomist school."
