= John Sinnich =

Irish-born priest and professor

John Sinnich OFM, (1603-1666) was an Irish-born priest who was professor of theology at the University of Louvain.

He compiled the index to the Augustinus, Cornelius Jansen's posthumously published work, and following the controversy, he tried to argue that Jansen's writings conformed with the Church's teachings and clear him from censure. As a result, he was himself accused of being a Jansenist.

Born in 1603 to Maurice Sinnich and Eleanor Hogan, in County Cork, Ireland, he was educated at the University of Louvain. He matriculated in 1624, gained a Masters in 1625, and his doctorate in 1637. Ordained a priest he also served as canon of Bruges Cathedral.

He was appointed professor in Louvain in 1637. Sinnich also held the position of president of Holy Ghost College in 1641. He was in Rome from 1643 to 1645 as a delegate for the college. In 1648 he served as regent of the Faculty of Theology.

He died in Louvain on 6 May 1666.

== Publications ==
- Saul ex-Rex sive de Saule, israeliticae gentis protomonarcha, divinitus primum sublimato, ac deinde ob violatam religionem principatu vitaque exuto, by John Sinnich, Lovanii, 1662.
- Molinomachia, hoc est Molinistarum in Augustinum Jansenii Antistis Iprensis insultus novissimus, Jean Sinnich, Paris, 1650.
- Sanctorum Patrum de Gratia Christi and libero arbitrio dimicantium Trias, Augustinus Hipponensis, Prosper Aquitanus, Fulgentius Ruspensis adversus Pelagium, Cassianum, Faustum. Quorum propria verba sine ullo additamento summa fide referuntur, by John Sinnich, 1648.
