= Normative principle of worship =

Theological principal in Christianity

The normative principle of worship is a Christian theological principle that teaches that worship in the Church can include those elements that are not prohibited by Scripture.

== History ==
Historically, regulative meant simply obeying direct instructions, whereas normative meant not just the requirements of the regulative principle, but also replicating patterns established by the scriptures. One example of this concerns congregationalist polity in respect of church government: proponents of this polity point to the biblical norm of churches being individually autonomous.

== Defining characteristics ==
The normative principle teaches that whatever is not prohibited in Scripture is permitted in worship, as long as it is agreeable to the peace and unity of the Church. In short, there must be agreement with the general practice of the Church and no prohibition in Scripture for what is done in worship.

The normative principle is often contrasted with the regulative principle of worship, which teaches that only those practices or elements specifically commanded or modelled in Scripture are permitted in worship services.

An example of the difference between these two principles of worship (normative and regulative) can be illustrated by announcing notices in church (i.e., news, upcoming events, and other information). The normative principle holds that, since such activity is not prohibited in the New Testament and may be beneficial for the congregation and its involvement in church activities, this practice is permitted. On the other hand, the regulative principle would prohibit such activity in the church service, because no example of announcing notices at the church gathering can be found in the New Testament.

== See also ==
- Regulative principle of worship
