= Regulative principle of worship =

Christian doctrine

The regulative principle of worship is a Reformed Christian doctrine held by the Continental Reformed, Anabaptist, Presbyterian, Congregationalist and Baptist traditions that God commands churches to conduct public services of worship using certain distinct elements affirmatively found in the Bible, and conversely, that God prohibits any and all other practices in public worship. The doctrine further determines these affirmed elements to be those set forth in scripture by express commands or examples or, if not expressed, those implied logically by good and necessary consequence. The regulative principle thus provides a governing concept of worship as obedience to God, identifies the set of specific practical elements constituting obedient worship, and identifies and excludes disobedient practices.

== Overview ==
The regulative principle of worship is held, practiced, and vigorously maintained by conservative Reformed churches, the Restoration Movement, and other conservative Protestant denominations. Historic confessional standards stating the doctrine include the Westminster Confession of Faith, the Heidelberg Catechism, the Belgic Confession, the Orthodox Creed, and the Second London Baptist Confession of Faith.

The regulative principle contrasts with the normative principle of worship, which teaches that whatever is not prohibited in scripture is permitted in worship as long as it is agreeable to peace and the unity of the Church. In short, there must be agreement with the general practice of the Church and no prohibition in scripture for whatever is done in worship.

A broader sense of the term "regulative principle" is occasionally cited on matters other than worship, such as to constrain designs of church government to scriptural elements. The regulative principle is often confused with the doctrine of sola scriptura, which states that scripture is the only infallible spiritual authority, but is compatible with and taught by many churches that follow the normative principle of worship.

== Scriptural basis ==
The Reformed confessions cite various biblical passages in support of the regulative principle, such as Deuteronomy 12, in which Yahweh gives the Israelites various commands about worship, sacrifice, and the avoidance of Canaanite religious practices, and says at the close of the chapter:

Whatever I am commanding you, you shall be careful to do; you shall not add to nor take away from it.

— Deuteronomy 12:32

Likewise, Reformed theologians cite Yahweh's punishment of the brothers Nadab and Abihu as illustrating an insistence by God that humans worship him only with practices that he has commanded. Nadab and Abihu, the Israelite prophet Aaron's own sons, "offered unauthorized fire before the LORD, which he had not commanded them." God immediately destroyed the brothers with fire of his own (Leviticus 10:1-2).

== Interpretations ==
The regulative principle is characteristic of John Calvin's thought: basing his approach on the Reformational principle of Sola Scriptura, Calvin removed from the order of church service any element not explicitly mentioned in the Bible in order to avoid any risk of compromise with the sacred tradition - which was promoted as a second source of dogma by the Roman Catholic Church. For instance, he associated musical instruments with icons, which he considered violations of the Ten Commandments' prohibition of graven images. On this basis, many early Calvinists also eschewed the use of musical instruments in worship and advocated exclusive psalmody. The Churches of Christ continues to hold to the traditional reformed interpretation of the regulative principle in regard to the prohibition of instrumental music in the worship service.

In 17th-century English church debates, the Puritans argued that there was a divine pattern to be followed at all times, which they called the ius divinum ("divine law", after a Latin term in the ancient Roman religion). This came to be known by the milder term "regulative principle" in English.

Those who oppose instruments in worship, such as Orthodox Presbyterian Church ministers John Murray and G. I. Williamson, argue first that there is no example of the use of musical instruments for worship in the New Testament and second that the Old Testament uses of instruments in worship were specifically tied to the ceremonial laws of the Temple in Jerusalem, which they take to be abrogated for the Church. Since the 1800s, however, most of the Reformed churches have modified their understanding of the regulative principle and make use of musical instruments, believing that Calvin and his early followers went beyond the biblical requirements of the Decalogue and that such things are circumstances of worship requiring biblically rooted wisdom, rather than an explicit command. The vast majority of Reformed churches today accordingly make use of hymns and musical instruments, and many also employ contemporary worship music styles and worship bands. A minority of Reformed churches, however — such as the Free Presbyterian Church of Scotland and the churches of the Reformed Presbyterian communion—continue to interpret the regulative principle and scriptural evidence as permitting only unaccompanied psalmody in worship.

The regulative principle was historically taken to prohibit the use of dance in worship. In 1996 reformed theologian John Frame broke the consensus and argued that the regulative principle does permit dancing, a view that was criticised by more conservative scholars.

While music is the central issue in worship debates, other matters have been contentious as well, including doxologies, benedictions, corporate confession of sin, prayer and the readings of creeds or portions of scripture. The presence of any one of these, their order and priority have ranged over various denominations.

== John Calvin's liturgy ==
The original Lord's Day service designed by John Calvin was a highly-liturgical service with the Creed, Alms, Confession and Absolution, the Lord's Supper, Doxologies, prayers, Psalms, the Lord's Prayer, and Benedictions. The following are Orders of Service for the Lord's Day as designed by John Calvin (Collect is a short prayer; Lection is a scripture reading; Fraction and Delivery are the breaking of the bread and distribution thereof, respectively):

Calvin: Strasbourg, 1540	Calvin: Geneva, 1542
Scripture Sentence (Psalm 124,8)	
Confession of sins	Confession of sins
Scriptural words of pardon	Prayer for pardon
Absolution	
Metrical Decalogue sung with Kyrie eleison after each Law	
Collect for Illumination	Collect for Illumination
Lection	Lection
Sermon	Sermon
Liturgy of the Upper Room
Collection of alms	Collection of alms
Intercessions	Intercessions
Lord's Prayer in long paraphrase	Lord's Prayer in long paraphrase
Preparation of elements while Apostles' Creed sung	Preparation of elements while Apostles' Creed sung
Consecration Prayer	
Words of Institution	Words of Institution
Exhortation	Exhortation
	Consecration Prayer
Fraction	Fraction
Delivery	Delivery
Communion, while psalm sung	Communion, while psalm or scriptures read
Post-communion collect	Post-communion collect
Nunc dimittis in metre	
Aaronic Blessing	Aaronic Blessing

== See also ==
- Musical instruments in church services
- Normative principle of worship
