= Alphonsus Liguori =

Italian Catholic bishop (1696–1787)

Saint Alphonsus Liguori CSsR
- Bishop of Sant'Agata de' Goti; Doctor of the Church
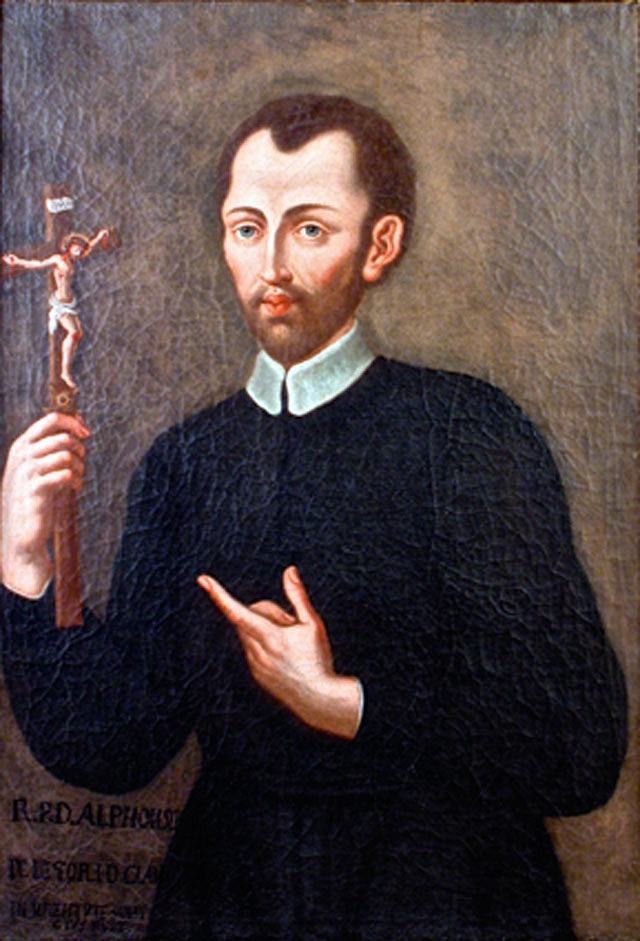
- Metropolis: Benevento
- Diocese: Sant'Agata de' Goti
- See: Sant'Agata de' Goti
- Appointed: 14 June 1762
- Installed: 20 June 1762
- Term ended: 26 June 1775
- Predecessor: Flaminius Danza
- Successor: Onofrio de Rossi

Orders
- Ordination: 21 December 1726
- Consecration: 20 June 1762 by Ferdinando Maria de Rossi

Personal details
- Born: 27 September 1696 Marianella, Campania, Kingdom of Naples
- Died: 1 August 1787 (aged 90) Pagani, Campania, Kingdom of Naples
- Denomination: Catholic Church

Sainthood
- Feast day: 1 August; 2 August (General Roman Calendar 1839–1969)
- Venerated in: Catholic Church
- Title as Saint: Bishop, Moral Theologian, Confessor and Doctor of the Church
- Beatified: 15 September 1816; Rome, Papal States by Pope Pius VII
- Canonized: 26 May 1839; Rome, Papal States by Pope Gregory XVI
- Patronage: Pagani, Cancello, Naples (co-patron); arthritis, lawyers, confessors, moralists, vocations
- Shrines: Basilica Sanctuary of St. Alphonsus di Liguori; 1, Piazza Sant'Alfonso di Liguori, Pagani, Salerno, Italy; National Shrine of St. Alphonsus Liguori; Baltimore, Maryland

Alphonsus Maria de Liguori CSsR (27 September 1696 – 1 August 1787) was an Italian Catholic bishop and saint, as well as a spiritual writer, composer, musician, artist, poet, lawyer, scholastic philosopher, and theologian. He founded the Congregation of the Most Holy Redeemer, known as the Redemptorists, in November 1732.

In 1762, he was appointed Bishop of Sant'Agata de' Goti. A prolific writer, he published nine editions of his Moral Theology in his lifetime, in addition to other devotional and ascetic works and letters. Among his best known works are The Glories of Mary and The Way of the Cross, the latter still used in parishes during Lenten devotions. He is also associated with the manualist tradition of moral theology and seminary education, which was highly influential in the 19th and early 20th centuries.

He was canonised in 1839 by Pope Gregory XVI and proclaimed a Doctor of the Church by Pope Pius IX in 1871. A frequently cited Catholic author, he is the patron saint of confessors.

== Early years ==
He was born in Marianella, near Naples, then part of the Kingdom of Naples, on 27 September 1696. He was the eldest of seven children of Giuseppe Liguori, a naval officer and Captain of the Royal Galleys, and Anna Maria Caterina Cavalieri. Two days after he was born, he was baptised at the Church of Our Lady the Virgin as Alphonsus Mary Anthony John Cosmas Damian Michael Gaspard de' Liguori. The family was of noble lineage, but the branch to which Liguori belonged had become somewhat impoverished.

== Education ==
Liguori learned to ride and fence but was never a good shot because of poor eyesight. Myopia and chronic asthma precluded a military career, so his father had him educated in the legal profession. He was taught by tutors before entering the University of Naples, where he graduated with a doctorate in civil and canon law at 16. He remarked later that he was so small at the time that he was almost buried in his doctor's gown and that all the spectators laughed. When he was 18, like many other nobles, he joined the Confraternity of Our Lady of Mercy, with whom he assisted in the care of the sick at the hospital for "incurables".

He became a successful lawyer. He was thinking of leaving the profession and wrote to someone, "My friend, our profession is too full of difficulties and dangers; we lead an unhappy life and run risk of dying an unhappy death." At 27, after losing an important case, the first he had lost in eight years of practising law, he made a firm resolution to leave the profession of law. Moreover, he subsequently reported hearing an "interior voice" saying: "Leave the world, and give yourself to me."

== Calling to the Priesthood ==
In 1723, he decided to offer himself as a novice to the Oratory of St. Philip Neri with the intention of becoming a priest. His father opposed the plan, but after two months (and with his Oratorian confessor's permission), he and his father compromised: he would study for the priesthood, but not as an Oratorian, and would live at home. He was ordained on 21 December 1726, at the age of 30. He lived his first years as a priest with the homeless and the marginalised youth of Naples. He became very popular because of his plain and simple preaching. He said: "I have never preached a sermon which the poorest old woman in the congregation could not understand". He founded the Evening Chapels, which were managed by the young people themselves. The chapels were centres of prayer and piety, preaching, community, social activities, and education. At the time of his death, there were 72, with over 10,000 active participants. His sermons were very effective at converting those who had been alienated from their faith.

Liguori suffered from scruples much of his adult life and felt guilty about the most minor issues relating to sin. Moreover, Liguori viewed scruples as a blessing at times and wrote: "Scruples are useful in the beginning of conversion... they cleanse the soul, and at the same time make it careful".

In 1729, Liguori left his family home and took up residence at the Chinese Institute in Naples. It was there that he began his missionary experience in the interior regions of the Kingdom of Naples, where he found people who were much poorer and more abandoned than any of the street children in Naples. In 1731, while he was ministering to earthquake victims in the town of Foggia, Alphonsus said he had a vision of the Virgin Mother in the appearance of a young girl of 13 or 14, wearing a white veil.

== Congregation of the Most Holy Redeemer ==
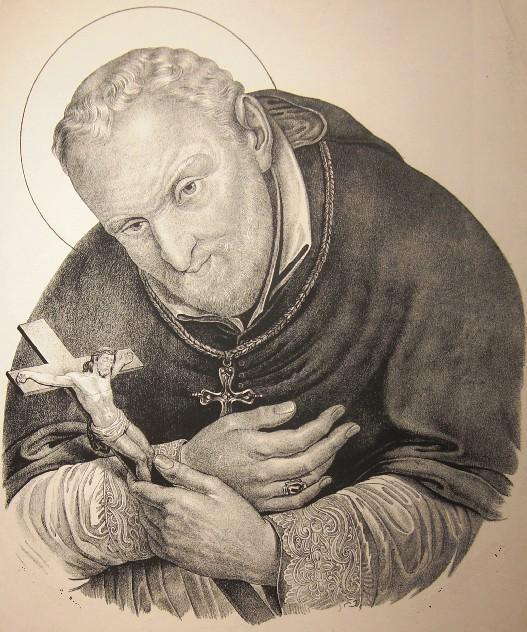
In devotional art, Liguori is often depicted bent over due to rheumatism.

On 9 November 1732, he founded the Congregation of the Most Holy Redeemer, when Sister Maria Celeste Crostarosa told him that it had been revealed to her that he was the one that God had chosen to found the congregation. He founded the congregation with the charism of preaching popular missions in the city and the countryside. Its goal was to teach and preach in the slums of cities and other poor places. The congregation also strongly opposed the development of Jansenism, a theological movement that to Alphonsus seem to exhibit excessive moral rigorism: "the penitents should be treated as souls to be saved rather than as criminals to be punished". He is said never to have refused absolution to a penitent himself.

A gifted musician and composer, he wrote many popular hymns and taught them to the people in parish missions. In 1732, while he was staying at the Convent of the Consolation, one of his order's houses in the small city of Deliceto in the province of Foggia in Southeastern Italy, Liguori wrote the Italian carol "Tu scendi dalle stelle" ("From Starry Skies Descending") in the musical style of a pastorale. The version with Italian lyrics was based on his original song written in Neapolitan, which began Quanno nascette Ninno ("When the child was born"). As it was traditionally associated with the zampogna, or large-format Italian bagpipe, it became known as Canzone d'i zampognari, the "Carol of the Bagpipers".

== Bishop of Sant' Agata de Goti and final years ==
Liguori was consecrated Bishop of Sant'Agata dei Goti in 1762. He tried to refuse the appointment by using his age and infirmities as arguments against his consecration. He wrote sermons, books, and articles to encourage devotion to the Blessed Sacrament and the Blessed Virgin Mary. He first addressed ecclesiastical abuses in the diocese, reformed the seminary and spiritually rehabilitated the clergy and faithful. He suspended those priests who celebrated Mass in less than 15 minutes and sold his carriage and episcopal ring to give the money to the poor.

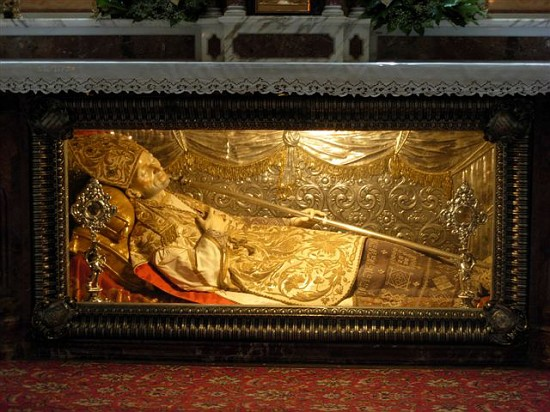
San Alfonso María de Ligorio, at the Basilica in Pagani, Italy

By May 1775, Alphonsus was "deaf, blind, and laden with so many infirmities, that he has no longer even the appearance of a man", and his resignation was finally accepted by the recently crowned Pope Pius VI. He continued to live with the Redemptorist community in Pagani, Italy, where he died on 1 August 1787. His remains are now in display in the parochial church in Pagani.

== Veneration and legacy ==
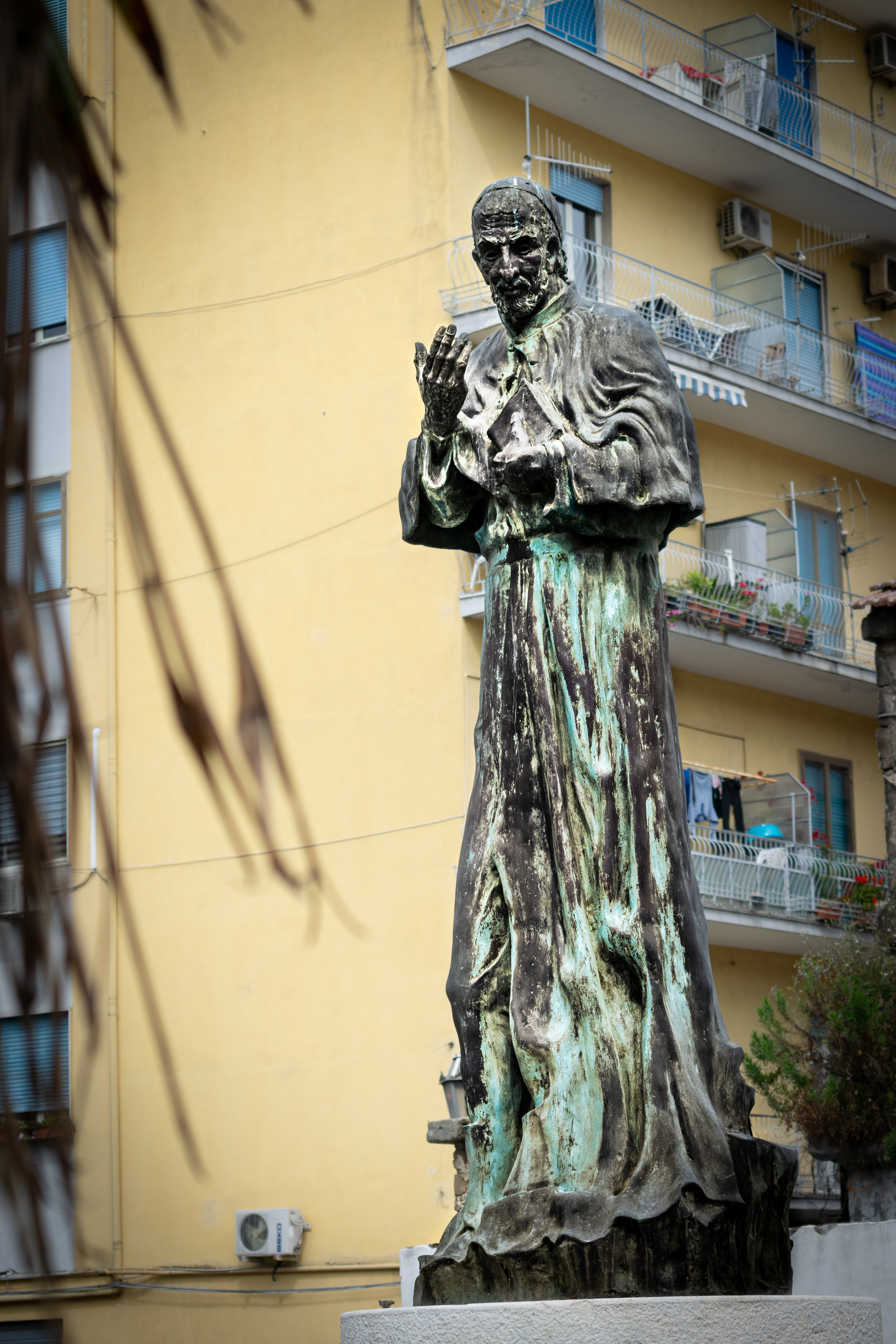
Town square of Pagani, Campania

He was beatified on 15 September 1816 by Pope Pius VII and canonised on 26 May 1839 by Pope Gregory XVI.

In 1949, the Redemptorists founded the Alphonsian Academy for the advanced study of Catholic moral theology. He was named the patron of confessors and moral theologians on 26 April 1950 by Pope Pius XII, who subsequently wrote of him in the encyclical Haurietis aquas.

In bestowing the title of "Prince of Moral Theologians", the church also gave the "unprecedented honour she paid to the Saint in her Decree of 22 July 1831, which allows confessors to follow any of St. Alphonsus's own opinions without weighing the reasons on which they were based." The church did not bestow this unique privilege lightly; it was due to his extraordinary combination of exceptional knowledge and understanding of church teachings combined with the great precision in which he wrote.

== Works ==
=== Overview ===
Liguori was a prolific and popular author. He was proficient in the arts, his parents having had him trained by various masters, and he was a musician, painter, poet and author at the same time. Liguori wrote 111 works on spirituality and theology. The 21,500 editions and the translations into 72 languages that his works have undergone attest to the fact that he is one of the most widely read Catholic authors.

His best-known musical work is his Christmas hymn Quanno Nascetti Ninno, later translated from Neapolitan into Italian by Pope Pius IX as Tu scendi dalle stelle ("From Starry Skies Thou Comest").

A strong defender of the Catholic Church, Liguori said:

To reject the divine teaching of the Catholic Church is to reject the very basis of reason and revelation, for neither the principles of the one nor those of the other have any longer any solid support to rest on; they can then be interpreted by every one as he pleases; every one can deny all truths whatsoever he chooses to deny. I therefore repeat: If the divine teaching authority of the Church, and the obedience to it, are rejected, every error will be endorsed and must be tolerated."

=== Moral theology ===
Liguori's greatest contribution to the Catholic Church was in the area of moral theology. His masterpiece was The Moral Theology (1748), which was approved by the Pope himself and was born of Liguori's pastoral experience, his ability to respond to the practical questions posed by the faithful and his contact with their everyday problems. He opposed sterile legalism and strict rigourism. According to him, those were paths closed to the Gospel because "such rigour has never been taught nor practised by the Church". His system of moral theology is noted for its prudence, avoiding both laxism and excessive rigour. He is credited with the position of Aequiprobabilism, which avoided Jansenist rigorism as well as laxism and simple probabilism. Since its publication, it has remained in Latin, often in 10 volumes or in the combined 4-volume version of Gaudé. It saw only recently its first publication in translation, in an English translation made by Ryan Grant and published in 2017 by Mediatrix Press. The English translation of the work is projected to be around 5 volumes.

=== Dogmatic Works ===
- Moral Theology (4 volume set originally written in Latin)
- The Triumph of the Church over all Heresies. A History of Heresies and Their Refutation
- Truth of the Faith ("Verità della Fede", there is no known English translation of this book from the Italian/Latin)
- On The Council of Trent

=== Mariology ===
His Mariology, though mainly pastoral in nature, rediscovered, integrated and defended that of Augustine of Hippo, Ambrose of Milan and other Church Fathers; it represented an intellectual defence of Mariology in the 18th century, the Age of Enlightenment, against the rationalism to which contrasted his fervent Marian devotion.

- The Glories of Mary
- Marian Devotion
- Prayers to the Divine Mother
- Spiritual Songs
- The True Spouse of Jesus Christ (original: La Vera Sposa di Gesù Cristo, cioè la Monaca Santa per Mezzo delle Virtù proprie d’una Religiosa (first edition: 1760–1761))

=== Other Ascetical works ===
- Great Means of Salvation and of Perfection
- The Way of Salvation and of Perfection
- The Stations of the Cross
- Preparation for Death
- The Incarnation, Birth and Infancy of Jesus Christ
- The Holy Eucharist
- Uniformity with God's Will (pamphlet)
- Victories of the Martyrs
- Sermons for all the Sundays in the Year

== See also ==
- Index of Catholic Church articles
- Mental prayer
- St. Alphonsus 'Rock' Liguori Church (St. Louis)
- Teresa of Ávila
- Principle of double effect – Christian ethical consideration
- Formalism (philosophy) – Concept of focusing on form over concept
- Legalism (theology) – Pejorative for performative Christianity
- Neo-scholasticism – Revival of scholasticism
