= List of Thomist writers (13th–18th centuries) =

This list of Thomist writers runs from the 13th to the 18th century, stopping short of neo-Thomism. It includes writers who engaged with the thought of Thomas Aquinas, but might not strictly be considered Thomist thinkers.

Source: The Catholic Encyclopedia of 1913, article Thomism. The listing is chronological, by date of death.

== Thirteenth century ==
- Thomas de Cantimpré
- Hugh of St Cher
- Vincent of Beauvais
- St Raymond de Pennafort
- Peter of Tarentaise (Pope)
- Giles de Lassines
- Reginald de Piperno
- William de Moerbeke
- Raymond Marti
- Bernard de Trilia
- Bernard of Hotun, Bishop of Dublin
- Dietrich of Apolda
- Thomas of Sutton

== Fourteenth century ==
- Peter of Auvergne
- Nicholas Boccasini, Benedict XI
- Godfrey of Fontaines
- Walter of Winterburn
- Ægidius Colonna
- William of Paris
- Gerard of Bologna
- four biographers
  - Peter Calo
  - William de Tocco
  - Ptolemy of Lucca
  - Bernard Guidonis
- Dante
- Natalis Hervieus
- Petrus de Palude
- Thomas Bradwardin
- Robert Holkott
- John Tauler
- Henry Suso
- Thomas of Strasburg
- Jacobus Passavante
- Nicholas Roselli
- Durandus of Aurillac
- John Bromyard
- Nicholas Eymeric

== Fifteenth century ==
- Manuel Calecas
- St Vincent Ferrer
- John Dominici
- Jean Gerson
- Luis of Valladolid
- Raymond Sabunde
- John Nieder
- Dominic of Flanders
- John de Montenegro
- Fra Angelico
- Antoninus of Florence
- Nicholas of Cusa
- John of Torquemada
- Bessarion
- Alanus de Rupe
- Johann Faber
- Petrus Niger
- Peter of Bergamo
- Jerome Savonarola

== Sixteenth century ==
- Felix Faber
- Vincent Bandelli
- John Tetzel
- Diego de Deza
- Sylvester Mazzolini
- Francesco Silvestro di Ferrara
- Thomas de Vio Cajetan
- Conrad Koellin
- Chrysostom Javelli
- Santes Pagnino
- Francisco de Vitoria
- Franc Romseus
- Ambrosius Catherinus
- St Ignatius of Loyola
- Matthew Ory
- Dominic Soto
- Melchior Cano
- Ambrose Pelargus
- Peter Soto
- Sixtus of Siena
- Johann Faber
- St Pius V
- Bartholomew Medina
- Vincent Justiniani
- Maldonatus
- Juan Maldonado
- St Charles Borromeo
- Louis of Granada
- Bartholomew of Braga
- Toletus (Francisco de Toledo), cardinal
- Peter Canisius
- Thomas Stapleton, Doctor of Louvain
- Molina

== Seventeenth century ==
- Domingo Báñez
- Bart Ledesma
- Baronius
- Capponi a Porrecta
- Aur Menochio
- Petr Ledesma
- Francisco Suárez
- Jacques Davy Duperron
- Robert Bellarmine
- Francis de Sales
- Hieronymus Medices
- Lessius
- Martin Becanus (Martin Verbeeck)
- Malvenda
- Thomas de Lemos
- Alvarez
- Paul Laymann
- Joann Wiggers
- Nicholas Riccardi
- Dominic Gravina
- John of St Thomas
- Juan Martínez de Ripalda
- Francis Sylvius, Du Bois
- Petavius
- Goar
- Giovanni Stefano Menochio
- Franc Pignatelli
- De Lugo
- Bollandus
- Jammy
- Thomas de Vallgornera
- Philippe Labbe
- Pallavicini
- Busenbaum
- Jean Nicolaï
- Vincent Contenson
- Jac Pignatelli
- Vicente Ferre (d. 1682)
- Passerini
- Jean Baptiste Gonet
- Louis Bancel
- Louis Thomassin
- Goudin
- Sfrondati
- Quétif
- Rocaberti
- Casanate

== Eighteenth century ==
- Jacques-Casimir Guerinois
- Bossuet
- Norisius, OSA
- Thyrsus González
- Antoine Massoulié
- Pierre Dens
- Du hamel
- Wigandt
- Piny
- Lacroix
- Carrières
- Natalis Alexander
- Jacques Échard
- Livarius de Meyer
- Benedict XIII
- Th du Jardin
- Hyacintha Serry
- Duplessis d'Argentré (Charles du Plessis d'Argentré)
- Vincent Louis Gotti
- Milante
- Preingue
- Concina
- Charles René Billuart
- Benedict XIV
- Cuiliati
- Giovanni Vincenzo Patuzzi
- De Rubeis
- Touron
- Thomas de Burgo
- Gener
- Alphonsus Liguori
- Mamachi
- Pietro Maria Gazzaniga (1722–1799)

== See also ==
- List of Catholic philosophers and theologians
- List of Jesuit theologians
