= Papal infallibility =

Dogma of the Catholic Church

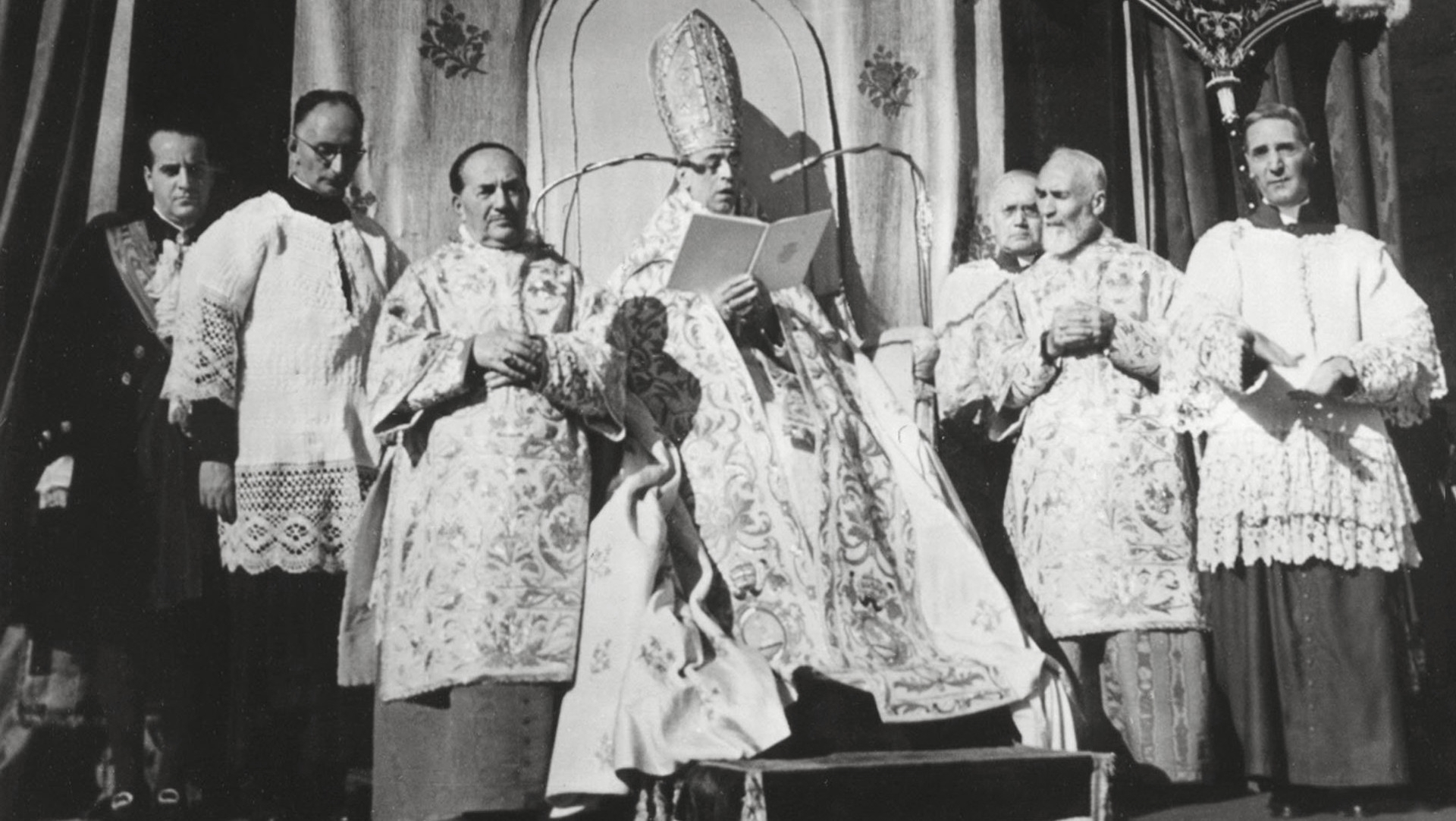
Pope Pius XII in 1950 proclaiming the dogma of the Assumption of Mary

Papal infallibility is a dogma of the Catholic Church which states that, in virtue of the promise of Jesus to Peter, the pope when he speaks ex cathedra is preserved from the possibility of error on doctrine "initially given to the apostolic Church and handed down in Scripture and tradition". It does not mean that the pope cannot sin or otherwise err. This doctrine, defined dogmatically at the First Vatican Council of 1869–1870 in the document Pastor aeternus, is claimed to have existed in medieval theology and to have been the majority opinion at the time of the Counter-Reformation.

The doctrine of infallibility relies on one of the cornerstones of Catholic dogma, that of papal supremacy, whereby the authority of the pope is the ruling agent as to what are accepted as formal beliefs in the Catholic Church. The use of this power is referred to as speaking ex cathedra. "Any doctrine 'of faith or morals' issued by the pope in his capacity as successor to St. Peter, speaking as pastor and teacher of the Church Universal [Ecclesia Catholica], from the seat of his episcopal authority in Rome, and meant to be believed 'by the universal church', has the special status of an ex cathedra statement. The First Vatican Council in 1870 declared that any such ex cathedra doctrines have the character of infallibility (session 4, Constitution on the Church 4)."

== Doctrine ==
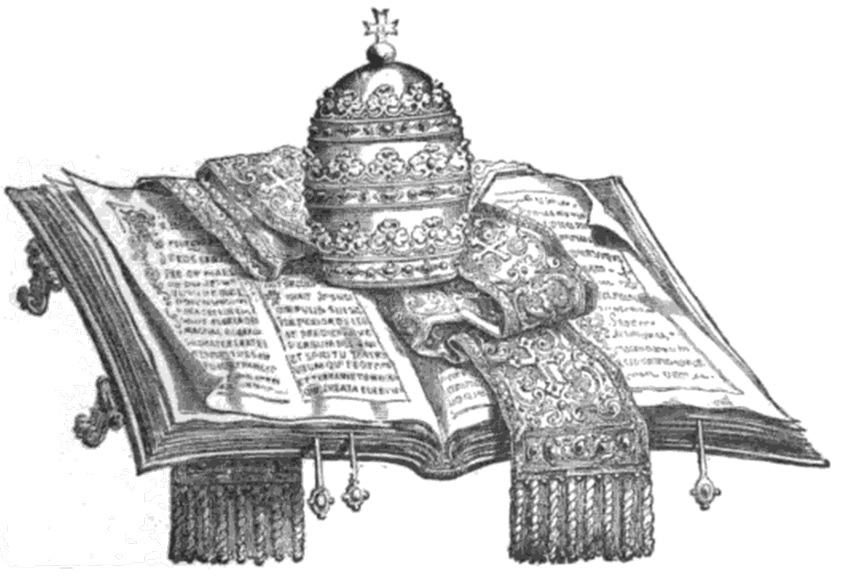
1881 illustration depicting papal infallibility

=== Nature of infallibility ===
The Church teaches that infallibility is a charism entrusted by Christ to the whole Church, whereby the Pope, as head of the College of Bishops, enjoys papal infallibility. This charism is the supreme degree of participating in Christ's divine authority, which, in the New Covenant, so as to safeguard the faithful from defection and guarantee the profession of faith, ensures the faithful abide in the truth. The Church further teaches that divine assistance is also given to the pope when he exercises his ordinary Magisterium.

=== Conditions for teachings being declared infallible ===
According to the teaching of the First Vatican Council and Catholic tradition, the conditions required for ex cathedra papal teaching are as follows:

1. the Roman pontiff (the pope alone or with the College of Bishops)
2. speaks ex cathedra – that is, when (in the discharge of his office as shepherd and teacher of all Christians, and by virtue of his supreme apostolic authority) he defines a doctrine:
  1. concerning faith or morals, and
  2. to be held by the whole Church.

The terminology of a definitive decree usually makes clear that this last condition is fulfilled, as through a formula such as "By the authority of Our Lord Jesus Christ and of the Blessed Apostles Peter and Paul, and by Our own authority, We declare, pronounce and define the doctrine [...] to be revealed by God and as such to be firmly and immutably held by all the faithful," or through an accompanying anathema stating that anyone who deliberately dissents is outside the Catholic Church.

For example, in 1950, with Munificentissimus Deus, Pope Pius XII's infallible definition regarding the Assumption of Mary, there are attached these words:

Hence if anyone, which God forbid, should dare willfully to deny or to call into doubt that which We have defined, let him know that he has fallen away completely from the divine and Catholic Faith.

As with all charisms, the Church teaches that the charism of papal infallibility must be properly discerned, though only by the Church's leaders. The way to know if something a pope says is infallible or not is to discern if they are ex cathedra teachings. Also considered infallible are the teachings of the whole body of bishops of the Church, especially but not only in an ecumenical council (see Infallibility of the Church).

=== Limits ===
Pastor aeternus does not allow any infallibility for the church or Pope for new doctrines. Any doctrines defined must be "conformable with Sacred Scripture and Apostolic Traditions":

For the Holy Spirit was not promised to the successors of Peter that by His revelation they might make known new doctrine, but that by His assistance they might inviolably keep and faithfully expound the Revelation, the Deposit of Faith, delivered through the Apostles.

It gives examples of the kinds of consultations that are appropriate: assembling Ecumenical Councils, asking for the mind of the Church scattered around the world, Synods, and so on.

Not all Catholic teaching is infallible. The Congregation for the Doctrine of the Faith differentiates three kinds of doctrine:

- to be believed as divinely revealed
- to be held definitely
  - following a solemn defining act by a pope or Ecumenical council
  - following a non-defining act by a Pope, confirming or re-affirming a thing taught by the ordinary and universal teaching authority of bishops worldwide
- otherwise, to be respected or submitted to (in the case of priests and religious) as part of the ordinary teaching authority of bishops, but without any claim of infallibility.

Examples of doctrines to be believed as 'divinely revealed' include the sayings of Jesus in the Gospels, since the Gospels are part of the Bible, which is part of the deposit of divine revelation, as well as the Immaculate Conception of Mary and the Assumption of Mary, since the documents defining these doctrines state clearly that they are part of the divinely revealed truths. Examples of doctrines to be held 'definitively' include Transubstantiation, the Sacramental Seal, women not being allowed to be ordained as priests, and papal infallibility itself.

In July 2005 Pope Benedict XVI stated during an impromptu address to priests in Aosta that: "The Pope is not an oracle; he is infallible in very rare situations, as we know." Pope John XXIII once remarked: "I am only infallible if I speak infallibly but I shall never do that, so I am not infallible." A doctrine proposed by a pope as his own opinion, not solemnly proclaimed as a doctrine of the Church, may be rejected as false, even if it is on a matter of faith and morals, and even more any view he expresses on other matters. A well-known example of a personal opinion on a matter of faith and morals that was taught by a pope but rejected by the Church is the view that Pope John XXII expressed on when the dead can reach the Beatific Vision. The limitation on the pope's infallibility "on other matters" is frequently illustrated by Cardinal James Gibbons's recounting how the Pope Leo XIII mistakenly called him "Jibbons".

== Background ==
=== Ex cathedra ===
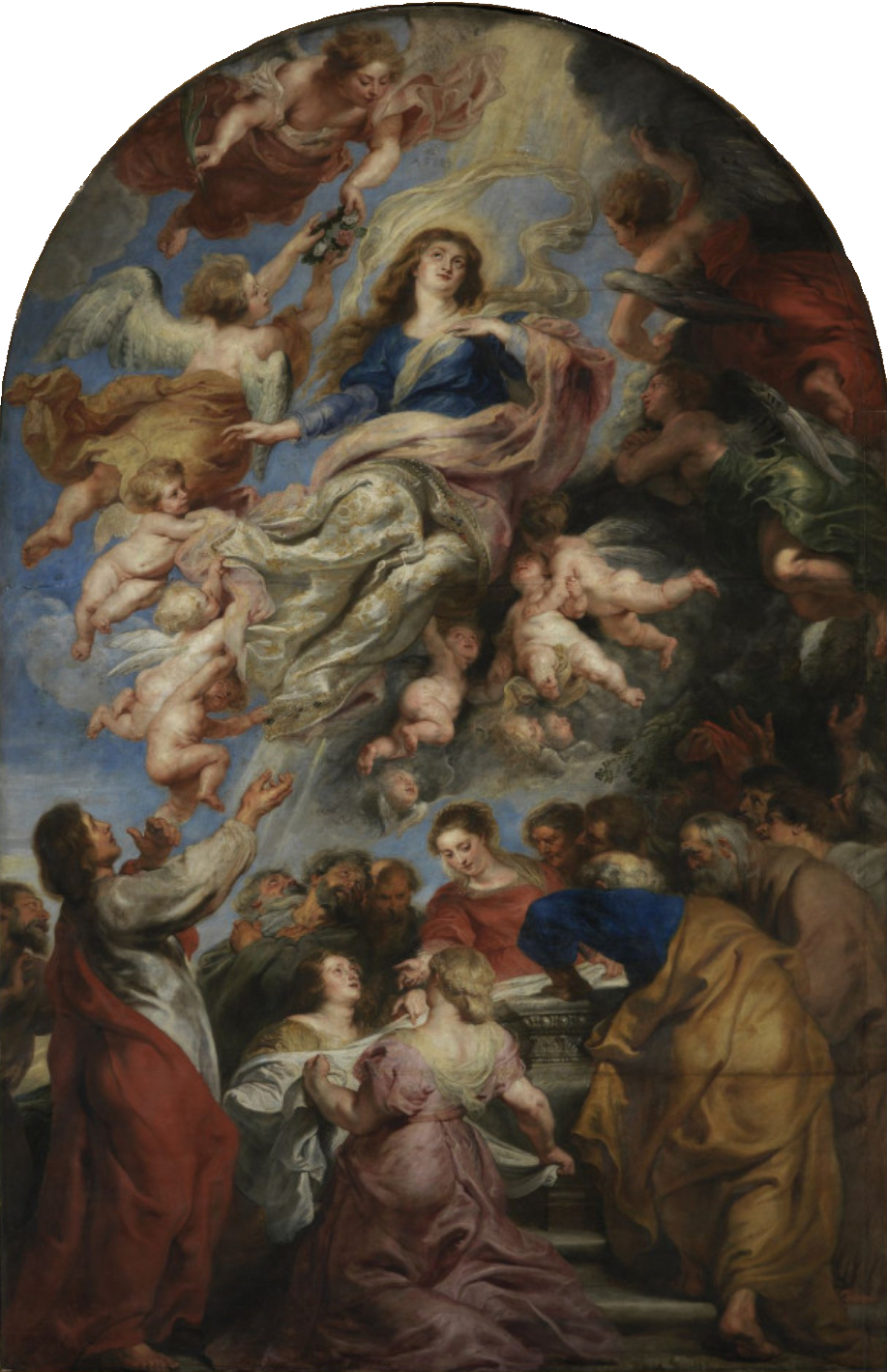
The only ex cathedra application of papal infallibility since its solemn declaration has been for the Marian Dogma of Assumption in 1950. Painting of the Assumption, Rubens, 1626

Cathedra and sedes are Latin words for 'chair', a symbol of the teacher in the ancient world. Thus is the position of a university professor referred to as a chair, and the position of a bishop as a see (from sedes). Believed by Catholics to be the successor of Peter, the pope is said to occupy the "Chair of Saint Peter" and his jurisdiction as the bishop of Rome is often referred to as the "Holy See". Because Catholics believe that their bishops are the successors of the apostles and that Peter had a special role among the apostles as the preserver of unity, the pope is considered the spokesman for the whole church.

The doctrine of papal infallibility, the Latin phrase ex cathedra (literally, 'from the chair'), was proclaimed by Pius IX in 1870 as meaning "when, in the exercise of his office as shepherd and teacher of all Christians, in virtue of his supreme apostolic authority, [the Bishop of Rome] defines a doctrine concerning faith or morals to be held by the whole Church."

The response demanded from believers has been characterized as 'assent' in the case of ex cathedra declarations of the popes and 'due respect' with regard to their other declarations.

=== Scripture and primacy of Peter ===
On the basis of Mark 3:16, 9:2, Luke 24:34 and 1 Corinthians 15:5, the Catechism of the Catholic Church describes Peter as holding first place among the apostles. It speaks of Peter as the rock on which, because of Peter's faith, Christ said in Matthew 16:18 he would build his Church, which he declared would be victorious over the powers of death. In Luke 22:32, Jesus gave Peter the mission to keep his faith after every lapse and to strengthen his brothers in it. The Catechism of the Catholic Church sees the power of the keys that Jesus promised in Matthew 16:19 to be for Peter alone and as signifying authority to govern the house of God, that is, the Church, an authority that Jesus after his resurrection confirmed for Peter by instructing him in John 21:15–17 to feed Christ's sheep. The power to bind and loose, conferred on all the apostles jointly and to Peter in particular (Matthew 16:19), is seen in the Catechism of the Catholic Church as authority to absolve sins, to pronounce judgments on doctrine and to make decisions on church discipline.

=== Primacy of the Roman pontiff ===
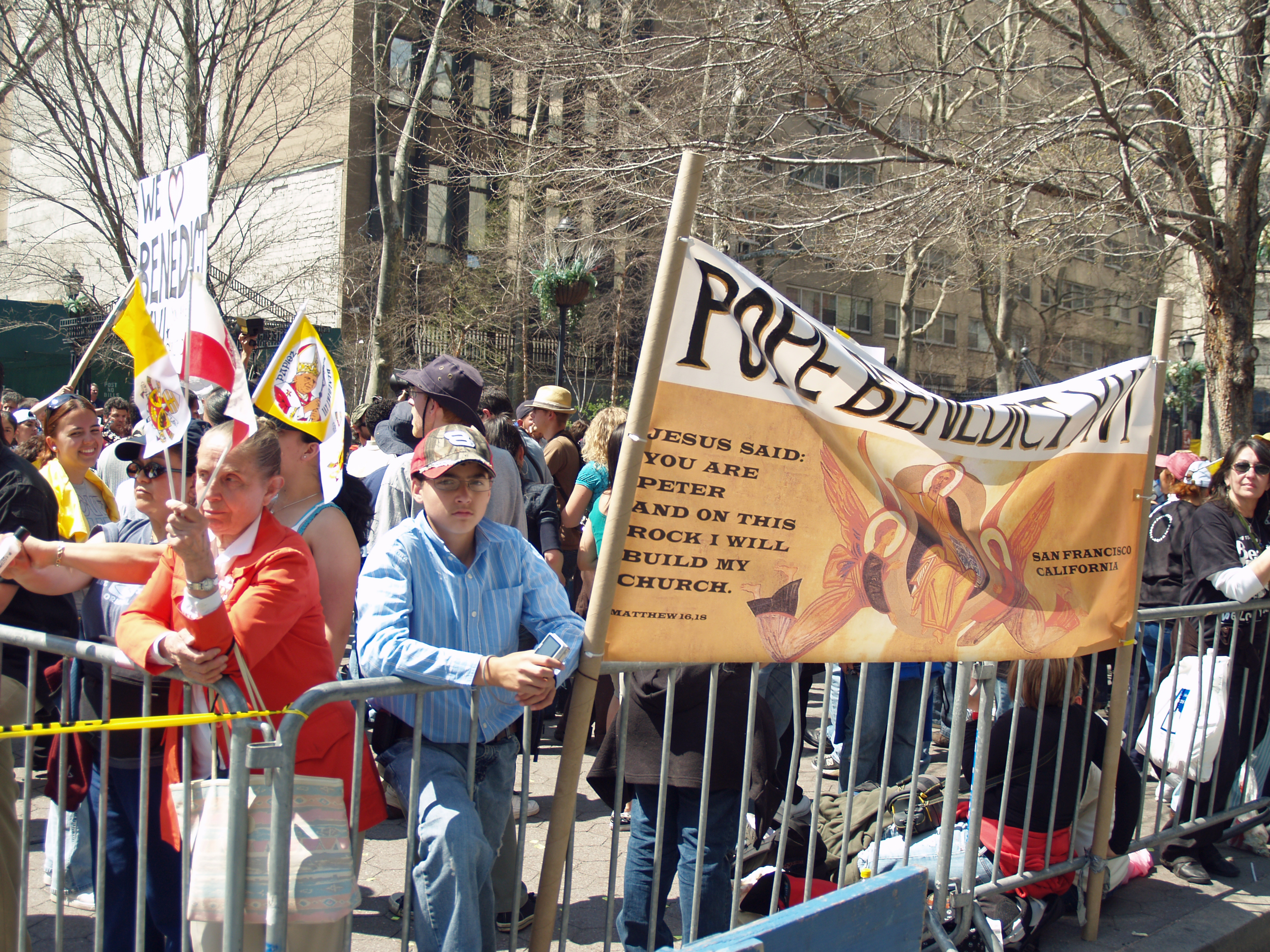
Supporters of the pope outside the United Nations in 2008 with a banner quoting Matthew 16

The doctrine of the Primacy of the Roman Bishops, like other Church teachings and institutions, has gone through a development. Thus the establishment of the Primacy recorded in the Gospels has gradually been more clearly recognised and its implications developed. Clear indications of the consciousness of the Primacy of the Roman bishops, and of the recognition of the Primacy by the other churches, appear at the end of the 1st century.

— Ludwig Ott

== Theological history ==
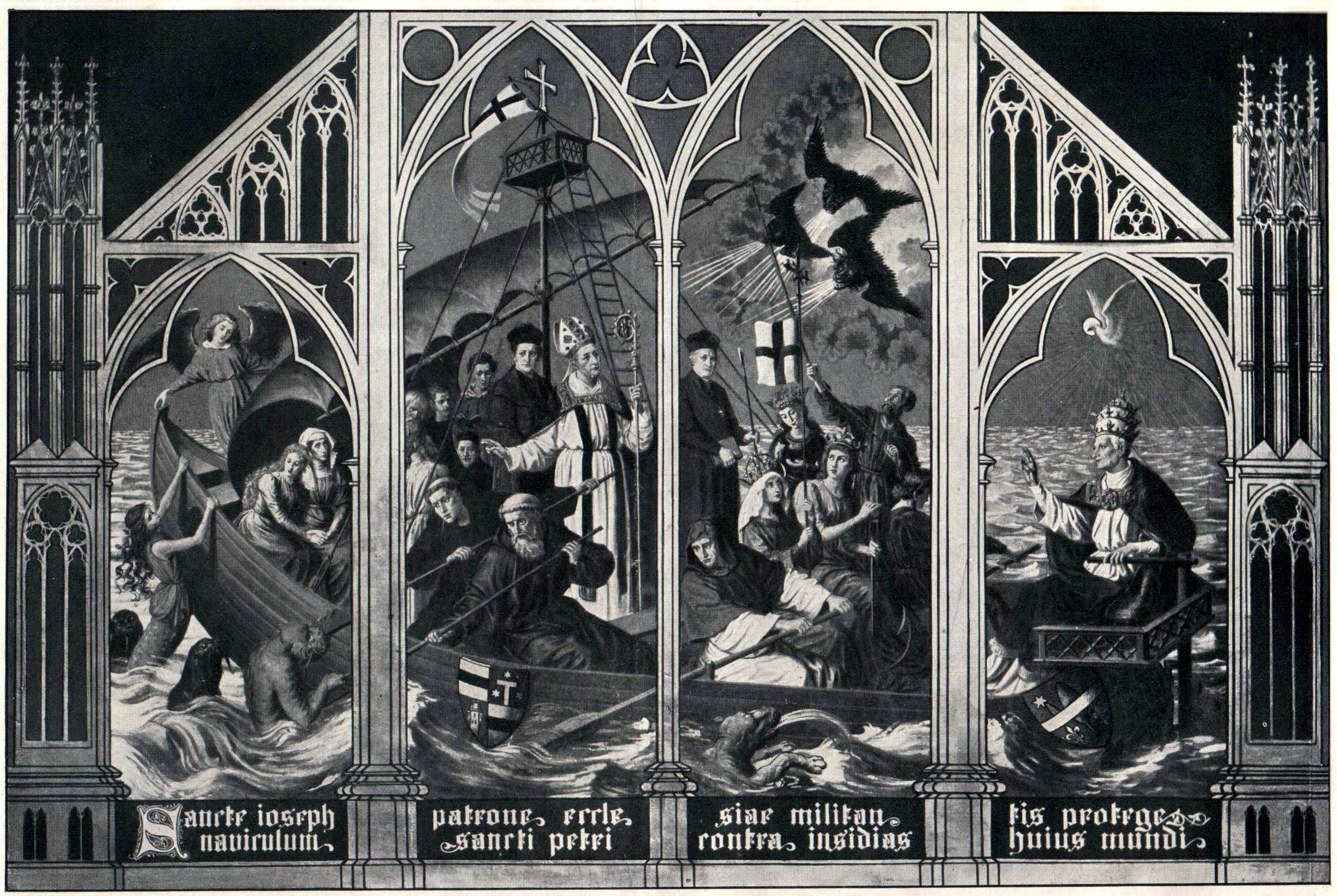
Pope Leo XIII, as Bishop of Rome and successor of the Apostle Peter, represented as guiding the ship of God's Church (painting by Friedrich Stummel in Kevelaer Shrine 1903).

Brian Tierney has argued that the 13th-century Franciscan priest Peter Olivi was the first person to attribute infallibility to the pope. Tierney's idea was accepted by August Bernhard Hasler, and by Gregory Lee Jackson. It was rejected by James Heft and by John V. Kruse. Klaus Schatz says Olivi by no means played the key role assigned to him by Tierney, who failed to acknowledge the work of earlier canonists and theologians, and that the crucial advance in the teaching came only in the 15th century, two centuries after Olivi; and he declares that "It is impossible to fix a single author or era as the starting point." Ulrich Horst criticized the Tierney view for the same reasons. In his Protestant evaluation of the ecumenical issue of papal infallibility, Mark E. Powell rejects Tierney's theory about 13th-century Olivi, saying that the doctrine of papal infallibility defined at the First Vatican Ecumenical Council had its origins in the 14th century – he refers in particular to Bishop Guido Terreni – and was itself part of a long development of papal claims.

Schatz points to "the special esteem given to the Roman church community [that] was always associated with fidelity in the faith and preservation of the paradosis (the faith as handed down)". Schatz differentiates between the later doctrine of "infallibility of the papal magisterium" and the Hormisdas formula in 519, which asserted that "The Roman church has never erred (and will never err)." He emphasizes that Hormisdas formula was not meant to apply so much to "individual dogmatic definitions but to the whole of the faith as handed down and the tradition of Peter preserved intact by the Roman Church". Specifically, Schatz argues that the Hormisdas formula does not exclude the possibility that individual popes become heretics because the formula refers "primarily to the Roman tradition as such and not exclusively to the person of the pope".

=== Ecumenical councils ===
The 12th-century Decretum Gratiani contained the declaration by Pope Gregory I (590–604) that the first four ecumenical councils were to be revered "like the four gospels" because they had been "established by universal consent", and also Gratian's assertion that, "The holy Roman Church imparts authority to the sacred canons but is not bound by them." Commentators on the Decretum, known as the Decretists, generally concluded that a pope could change the disciplinary decrees of the ecumenical councils but was bound by their pronouncements on articles of faith, in which field the authority of a general council was higher than that of an individual pope. Unlike those who propounded the 15th-century conciliarist theories, they understood an ecumenical council as necessarily involving the pope, and meant that the pope plus the other bishops was greater than a pope acting alone.

=== Middle Ages ===
Several medieval theologians discussed the infallibility of the pope when defining matters of faith and morals, including Thomas Aquinas.

The Dictatus papae have been attributed to Pope Gregory VII (1073–1085) in the year 1075, but some have argued that they are later than 1087. They assert that no one can judge the pope (Proposition 19) and that "the Roman church has never erred; nor will it err to all eternity, the Scripture bearing witness" (Proposition 22). This is seen as a further step in advancing the idea that papal infallibility "had been part of church history and debate as far back as 519 when the notion of the Bishop of Rome as the preserver of apostolic truth was set forth in the Formula of Hormisdas".

In the early years of the 14th century, the Franciscan Order found itself in open conflict between the "Spirituals" and the Conventual Franciscans over the form of poverty to observe. The Spirituals adopted extremist positions that eventually discredited the notion of apostolic poverty and led to condemnation by Pope John XXII. This pope determined to suppress what he considered to be the excesses of the Spirituals, who contended that Christ and his apostles had possessed absolutely nothing, either separately or jointly. The "Spirituals" argued that John XXII's predecessors had declared the absolute poverty of Christ to be an article of faith and that therefore no pope could declare the contrary. Appeal was made in particular to the 14 August 1279 bull Exiit qui seminat, in which Pope Nicholas III stated that renunciation of ownership of all things "both individually but also in common, for God's sake, is meritorious and holy; Christ, also, showing the way of perfection, taught it by word and confirmed it by example, and the first founders of the Church militant, as they had drawn it from the fountainhead itself, distributed it through the channels of their teaching and life to those wishing to live perfectly."

By the bull Ad conditorem canonum of 8 December 1322, Pope John XXII, declaring it ridiculous to pretend that every scrap of food given to the friars and eaten by them belonged to the pope, forced them to accept ownership by ending the arrangement according to which all property given to the Franciscans was vested in the Holy See, which granted the friars the mere use of it. He thus demolished the fictitious structure that gave the appearance of absolute poverty to the life of the Franciscan friars, a structure that "absolved the Franciscans from the moral burden of legal ownership, and enabled them to practise apostolic poverty without the inconvenience of actual poverty". This document was concerned with disciplinary rather than doctrinal matters, but leaders of the Franciscans reacted with insistence on the irreformability of doctrinal papal decrees, with special reference to Exiit. A year later, John XXII issued the short 12 November 1323 bull Cum inter nonnullos, which declared "erroneous and heretical" the doctrine that Christ and his apostles had no possessions whatever.

The next year, the pope responded to continued criticisms with the bull Quia quorundam of 10 November 1324. He denied the major premise of an argument of his adversaries, "What the Roman pontiffs have once defined in faith and morals with the key of knowledge stands so immutably that it is not permitted to a successor to revoke it."

In his book on the First Vatican Council, August Hasler wrote, "John XXII didn't want to hear about his own infallibility. He viewed it as an improper restriction of his rights as a sovereign, and in the bull Qui quorundam (1324) condemned the Franciscan doctrine of papal infallibility as the work of the devil."

Brian Tierney has summed up his view of the part played by John XXII as follows:

Pope John XXII strongly resented the imputation of infallibility to his office – or at any rate to his predecessors. The theory of irreformability proposed by his adversaries was a "pestiferous doctrine", he declared; and at first he seemed inclined to dismiss the whole idea as "pernicious audacity". However, through some uncharacteristic streak of caution or through sheer good luck (or bad luck) the actual terms he used in condemning the Franciscan position left a way open for later theologians to re-formulate the doctrine of infallibility in different language.

=== Post-Counter-Reformation ===
In the period following the Counter-Reformation the Dominican school of theology at the Roman College of Saint Thomas in Rome, the future Pontifical University of Saint Thomas Aquinas, Angelicum was active in defending the doctrine of papal infallibility. Vincentius Ferre (d. 1682), Regent of College of St. Thomas from 1654 to 1672, writes in his De Fide in defense of papal infallibility that Christ said "I have prayed for thee, Peter; sufficiently showing that the infallibility was not promised to the Church as apart from (seorsum) the head, but promised to the head, that from him it should be derived to the Church." Dominic Gravina, professor of theology at the College of St. Thomas in Rome, wrote concerning papal infallibility: "To the Pontiff, as one (person) and alone, it was given to be the head", and again, "The Roman Pontiff for the time being is one, therefore he alone has infallibility." Vincenzo Maria Gatti, also a professor of theology at the College of St. Thomas, defending papal infallibility, says of Christ's words "I have prayed for thee", etc., that "indefectibility is promised to Peter apart from (seorsum) the Church, or from the Apostles; but it is not promised to the Apostles, or to the Church apart (seorsum) the head, or with the head", adding: "Therefore Peter, even apart from (seorsum) the Church, is infallible."

=== Pastor aeternus ===
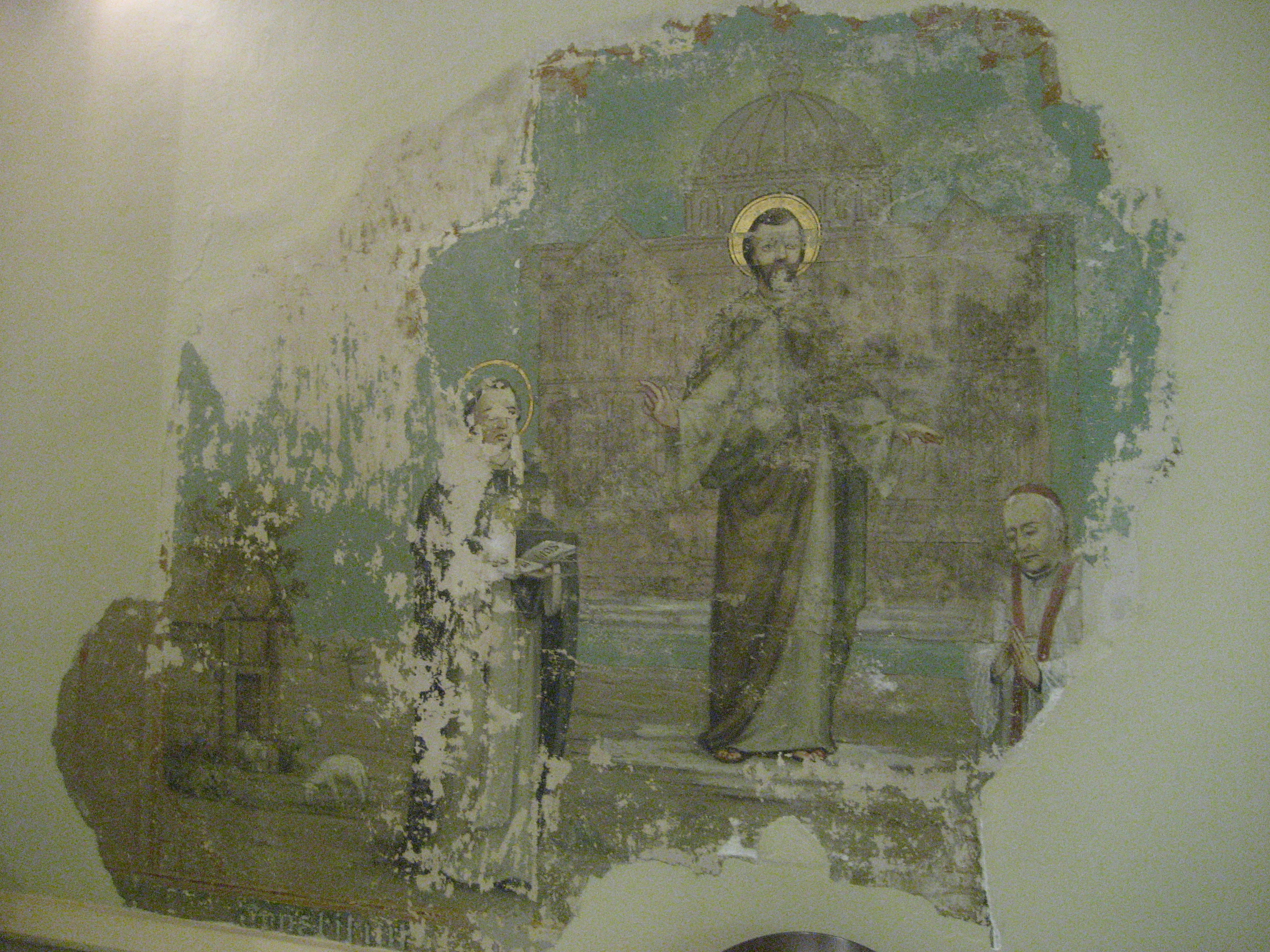
Painting to commemorate the dogma of papal infallibility (Voorschoten, 1870). Right to left: Pope Pius IX, Christ, and Thomas Aquinas

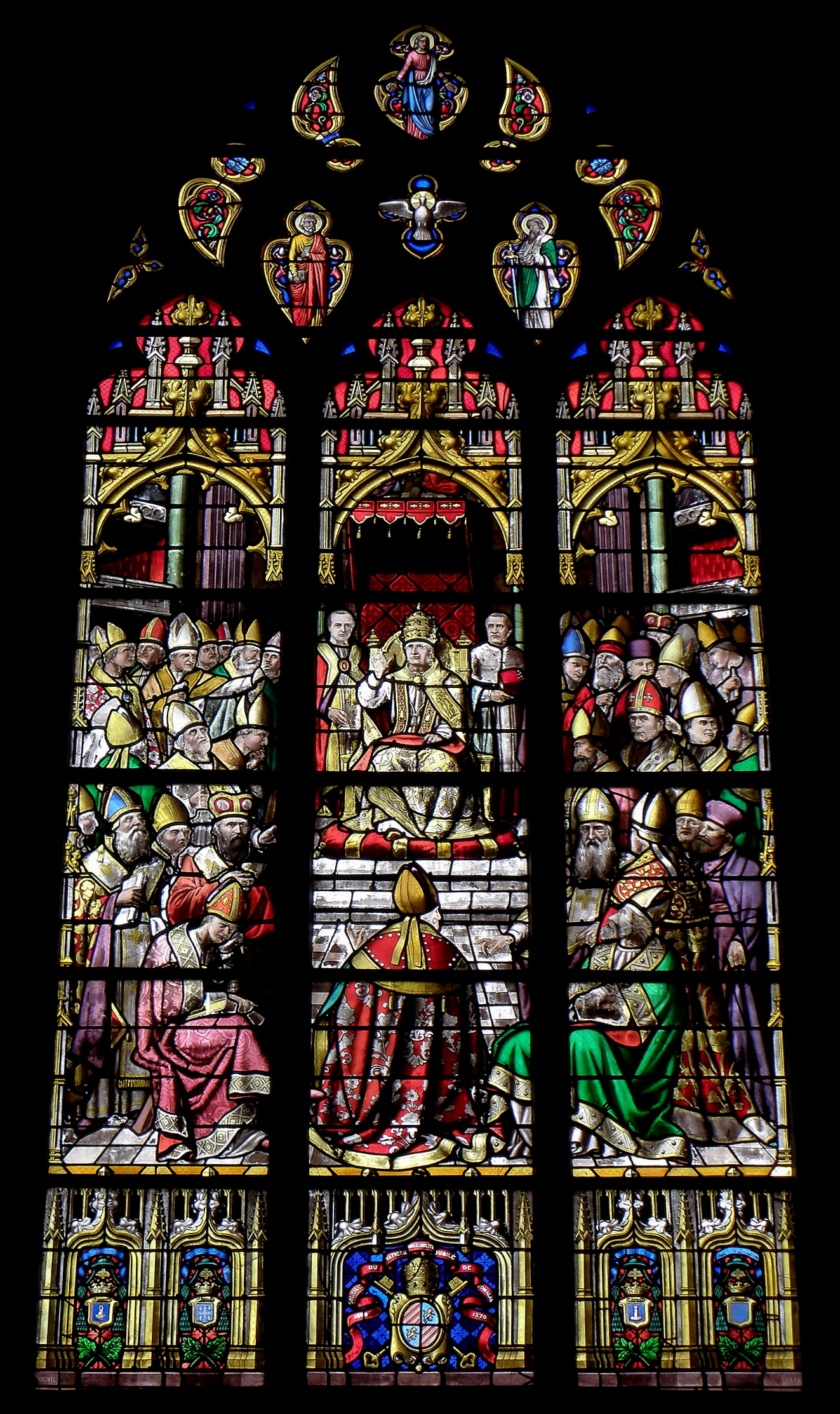
Window in Domalain, Brittany, showing the Proclamation of Papal Infallibility

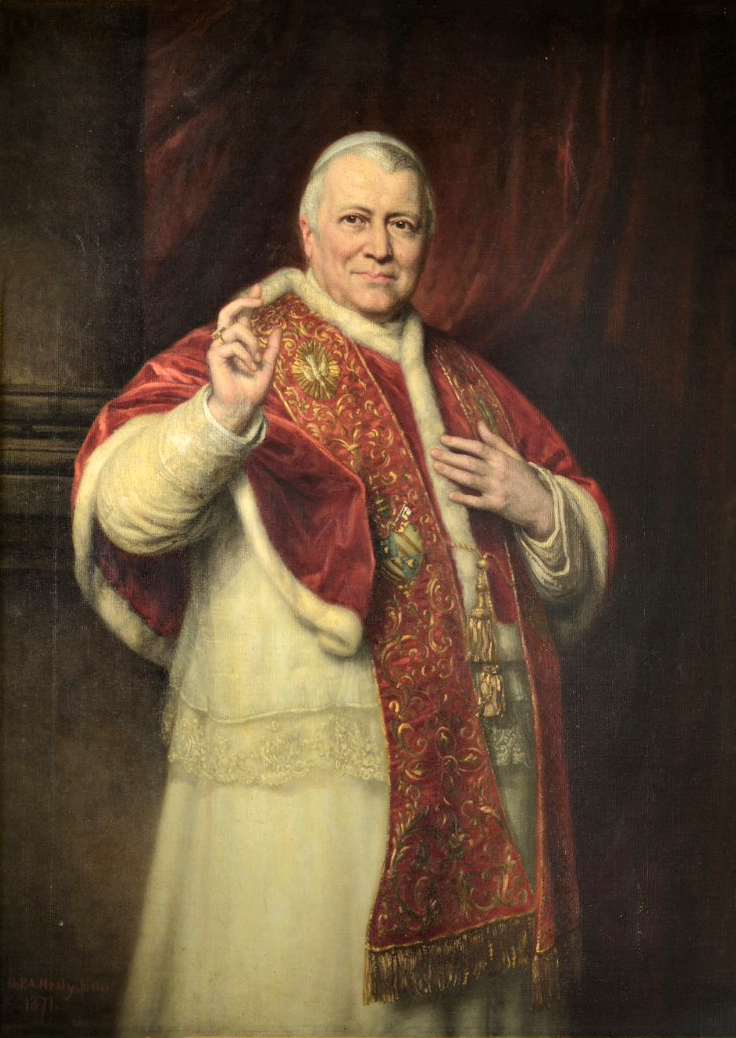
Pope Pius IX (1846–1878), during whose papacy the doctrine of papal infallibility was dogmatically defined by the First Vatican Council

The infallibility of the pope was formally defined in 1870, although the tradition behind this view goes back much further. In the conclusion of the fourth chapter of its Dogmatic Constitution on the Church Pastor aeternus, the First Vatican Council declared the following:

We teach and define that it is a dogma Divinely revealed that the Roman pontiff when he speaks ex cathedra, that is when in discharge of the office of pastor and doctor of all Christians, by virtue of his supreme Apostolic authority, he defines a doctrine regarding faith or morals to be held by the universal Church, by the Divine assistance promised to him in Blessed Peter, is possessed of that infallibility with which the Divine Redeemer willed that his Church should be endowed in defining doctrine regarding faith or morals, and that therefore such definitions of the Roman pontiff are of themselves and not from the consent of the Church irreformable.

So then, should anyone, which God forbid, have the temerity to reject this definition of ours: let him be anathema.

— Vatican Council, Sess. IV, Const. de Ecclesiâ Christi, Chapter iv

The fourth chapter was subject to two votes in July 1870. In the first on 13 July there were 601 voters: 451 affirmative, 62 conditional affirmative, and 88 negative. The latter groups were then permitted to leave; others left because of the imminent Franco-Prussian War. The final vote on 18 July saw 433 affirmative and only two negative votes, from bishops Aloisio Riccio and Edward Fitzgerald.

=== Lumen gentium ===
The dogmatic constitution Lumen gentium of the Second Vatican Council, which was also a document on the Catholic Church itself, explicitly reaffirmed the definition of papal infallibility, so as to avoid any doubts, expressing this in the following words:

This Sacred Council, following closely in the footsteps of the First Vatican Council, with that Council teaches and declares that Jesus Christ, the eternal Shepherd, established His holy Church, having sent forth the apostles as He Himself had been sent by the Father; and He willed that their successors, namely the bishops, should be shepherds in His Church even to the consummation of the world. And in order that the episcopate itself might be one and undivided, He placed Blessed Peter over the other apostles, and instituted in him a permanent and visible source and foundation of unity of faith and communion. And all this teaching about the institution, the perpetuity, the meaning and reason for the sacred primacy of the Roman Pontiff and of his infallible magisterium, this Sacred Council again proposes to be firmly believed by all the faithful.

== Operation ==
=== Frequency of infallible declarations ===
There is debate in the church between those who believe that infallibility is exercised rarely and explicitly and those that believe that it is common.

An example of where there is dispute over whether a subject matter is within the limits of infallibility is the canonization of a saint by a pope. If they are, then they would represent a very common occurrence during a papacy. However, those are usually regarded as not of divine faith, as they depend on facts that post-date New Testament revelation. The status of individuals as saints in heaven is not taught in the Catholic Catechism or Creeds as required for belief. However, some Catholic theologians have in the past held that the canonization of a saint by a pope is infallible teaching that the person canonized is definitely in heaven with God, because it relates to Faith. A decree of canonization invites the whole Church to venerate the person as a saint, while beatification merely permits it. In its 1998 Commentary on the Concluding Formula of the 'Professio fidei, the Congregation for the Doctrine of the Faith listed "the canonizations of saints" as "those truths connected to revelation by historical necessity and which are to be held definitively, but are not able to be declared as divinely revealed".

=== Instances of infallible declarations ===
Prof. Frank K. Flinn states the doctrine of the Immaculate Conception proclaimed by Ineffabilis Deus in 1854 is "generally accepted" as being an ex cathedra statement. Since the declaration of papal infallibility by Vatican I (1870), Flinn states, the only example of an ex cathedra statement thereafter took place in 1950, when Pope Pius XII defined the Assumption of Mary as an article of faith. In Ineffabilis Deus and Pius XII's cases, the popes consulted with Catholic bishops before making their declaration.

Regarding historical papal documents, Catholic theologian and church historian Klaus Schatz made a thorough study, published in 1985, that claims the following list of documents to be ex cathedra:

1. Tome to Flavian, Pope Leo I, 449, on the two natures in Christ, received by the Council of Chalcedon;
2. Letter of Pope Agatho, 680, on the two wills of Christ, received by the Third Council of Constantinople;
3. Benedictus Deus, Pope Benedict XII, 1336, on the beatific vision of the just after death rather than only just prior to final judgment;
4. Cum occasione, Pope Innocent X, 1653, condemning five propositions of Jansen as heretical;
5. Auctorem fidei, Pope Pius VI, 1794, condemning several Jansenist propositions of the Synod of Pistoia as heretical;
6. Ineffabilis Deus, Pope Pius IX, 1854, defining the Immaculate Conception;
7. Munificentissimus Deus, Pope Pius XII, 1950, defining the Assumption of Mary.

There is no complete list of papal statements considered infallible.

A 1998 commentary on Ad Tuendam Fidem issued by the Congregation for the Doctrine of the Faith published on L'Osservatore Romano in July 1998 listed a number of instances of infallible pronouncements by popes and by ecumenical councils, but explicitly stated (at no. 11) that this was not meant to be a complete list. The list included as ex cathedra pronouncements Ineffabilis Deus, Munificentissimus Deus, and Benedictus Deus. Pope John Paul II's confirming of "the doctrine on the grave immorality of direct and voluntary killing of an innocent human being" and that euthanasia is "a grave violation of the law of God" in encyclical Evangelium Vitae was also listed in the same way by the Congregation (i.e. infallible, although not taught ex cathedra). Ordinatio sacerdotalis was also listed an infallible.

==== Ordinatio sacerdotalis ====
When he was prefect of the Congregation for the Doctrine of the Faith, Cardinal Ratzinger (later Pope Benedict XVI), under John Paul II's authority, stated in a formal response (responsum) to an inquiry (dubium) that John Paul II's decision on the ordination of women into the Catholic priesthood in his apostolic letter Ordinatio sacerdotalis was part of the "ordinary and infallible" magisterial teaching of the Catholic Church. This was restated three years later in a commentary by the same Congregation.

The opinion it was infallible was also stated in private commentaries by Cardinals Joseph Ratzinger, Tarcisio Bertone, and Luis Ladaria Ferrer.

Nicholas Lash, an ex-priest and emeritus professor of divinity at the University of Cambridge, disputes that this doctrine be truly infallible. The Catholic Theological Society of America in a report titled "Tradition and the Ordination of Women" concluded that Ordinatio sacerdotalis is mistaken with regard to its claims on the authority of this teaching and its grounds in Tradition.

Prof. Frank K. Flinn claims that Pope John Paul II's statement on the inadmissibility of women to the priesthood was not infallible; Flinn considers that Cardinal Ratzinger's later responsa to the dubium on the subject was therefore erroneous.

Pope Francis stated in two interviews (2013 and 2016) that John Paul II's decision was the definitive position on women's ordination.

== Objections ==
=== Objections by Catholics ===
Before 1870, belief in papal infallibility was not a defined requirement of Catholic faith.

==== Before Vatican I ====
Examples of Catholics who before the First Vatican Council disbelieved in papal infallibility are French abbé François-Philippe Mesenguy (1677–1763), who wrote a catechism denying the infallibility of the pope, and the German Felix Blau (1754–1798), who as professor at the University of Mainz criticized infallibility without a clearer mandate in Scripture.

In the Declaration and Protestation signed by the English Catholic Dissenters in 1789, the year of the French Revolution, the signatories state:

We have also been accused of holding, as a Principle of our Religion, That implicit Obedience is due from us to the Orders and Decrees of Popes and General Councils; and that therefore if the Pope, or any General Council, should, for the Good of the Church, command us to take up Arms against the Government, or by any means to subvert the Laws and Liberties of this Country, or to exterminate Persons of a different Persuasion from us, we (it is asserted by our Accusers) hold ourselves bound to obey such Orders or Decrees, on pain of eternal Fire:

Whereas we positively deny, That we owe any such Obedience to the Pope and General Council, or to either of them; and we believe that no Act that is in itself immoral or dishonest can ever be justified by or under Colour that it is done either for the Good of the Church, or in Obedience to any ecclesiastical Power whatever. We acknowledge no Infallibility in the Pope, and we neither apprehend nor believe, that our Disobedience to any such Orders or Decrees (should any such be given or made) could subject us to any Punishment whatever.

Under King George III, Catholics who wished to take office had to swear an oath of allegiance. The oath was particularly aimed at foreswearing that the Pope could infallibly order or forgive regicide. The oath was required in Ireland from 1793. A similar article was operative in England. Part of the oath stated "It is not an article of the Catholic Faith, neither am I thereby required to believe or profess that the Pope is infallible." The Irish bishops repeated their acceptance in a 25 January 1826 pastoral address to the Catholic clergy and laity in Ireland, stating: "The Catholics of Ireland not only do not believe, but they declare upon oath [...] that it is not an article of the Catholic faith, neither are they required to believe, that the Pope is infallible, and that they do not hold themselves 'bound to obey any order in its own nature immoral', though the Pope or any ecclesiastical power should issue or direct such an order; but, on the contrary, that it would be sinful in them to pay any respect or obedience thereto."

In 1822, Bishop Baine declared: "In England and Ireland I do not believe that any Catholic maintains the Infallibility of the Pope."

In his 1829 study On the Church, Delahogue stated: "Ultramontane theologians attribute infallibility to the Bishop of Rome considered in this aspect and when he speaks, as the saying is, ex cathedra. This is denied by others, in particular by Gallicans."

Professor Delahogue asserted that the doctrine that the Roman Pontiff, even when he speaks ex cathedra, is possessed of the gift of inerrancy or is superior to General Councils may be denied without loss of faith or risk of heresy or schism.

The 1830 edition of Berrington and Kirk's Faith of Catholics stated: "Papal definitions or decrees, in whatever form pronounced, taken exclusively from a General Council or acceptance of the Church, oblige no one under pain of heresy to an interior assent."

In 1861, Professor Murray of the major Irish Catholic seminary of Maynooth wrote that those who genuinely deny the infallibility of the pope "are by no means or only in the least degree (unless indeed some other ground be shown) to be considered alien from the Catholic Faith."

==== After Vatican I ====
Following the 1869–1870 First Vatican Council, dissent arose among some Catholics, almost exclusively German, Austrian, and Swiss, over the definition of papal infallibility. The dissenters, while holding the General Councils of the Church infallible, were unwilling to accept the dogma of papal infallibility, and thus a schism arose between them and the Church, resulting in the formation of communities in schism with Rome, which became known as the Old Catholic Churches. The vast majority of Catholics accepted the definition.

Before the First Vatican Council, John Henry Newman, while personally convinced, as a matter of theological opinion, of papal infallibility, opposed its definition as dogma, fearing that the definition might be expressed in over-broad terms open to misunderstanding. He was pleased with the moderate tone of the actual definition, which "affirmed the pope's infallibility only within a strictly limited province: the doctrine of faith and morals initially given to the apostolic Church and handed down in Scripture and tradition."

==== Alteration of writings after Vatican I ====
Critical works such as Roman Catholic Opposition to Papal Infallibility (1909) by W. J. Sparrow Simpson have documented opposition to the definition of the dogma during the First Vatican Council even by those who believed in its teaching but felt that defining it was not opportune.

Sparrow Simpson, an Anglican, notes that "All works reprinted since 1870 have been altered into conformity with Vatican ideas". For example:

- The 1860 edition of Keenan's Catechism in use in Catholic schools in England, Scotland and Wales attributed to Protestants the idea that Catholics were obliged to believe in papal infallibility:
  (Q.) Must not Catholics believe the Pope himself to be infallible?
  (A.) This is a Protestant invention: it is no article of the Catholic faith: no decision of his can oblige under pain of heresy, unless it be received and enforced by the teaching body, that is by the bishops of the Church.
- In the 1895 revision:
  (Q.) What do Catholics believe concerning the Infallibility of the Pope?
  (A.) That the visible Head of the Church on earth received from Christ the same prerogative of Infallibility which we have shown above to be necessary to and belong to the Church by divine institution.
  ...
  (Q.) But some Catholics before the Vatican Council denied the Infallibility of the Pope, which was also formerly impugned in this very Catechism.
  (A.) Yes; but they did so under the usual reservation – "in so far as they could then grasp the mind of the Church, and subject to her future definitions."

The Catechism goes on to compare this to the doctrine of the divinity of Christ, which was not formally defined until the Council of Nicaea in 325. Sparrow Simpson remarks that this attitude would absurdly imply that Arians prior to Nicaea could be counted as Catholics.

==== Modern objections ====
A 1989–1992 survey of young people of the 15 to 25 age group (81% of whom were Catholics, 84% were younger than 19, and 62% were male) chiefly from the United States, but also from Austria, Canada, Ecuador, France, Ireland, Italy, Japan, Korea, Peru, Spain and Switzerland, found that 36.9% affirmed that, "The Pope has the authority to speak with infallibility", 36.9% (exactly the same proportion) denied it, and 26.2% said they did not know.

A few Catholics in recent times, such as Hans Küng, author of Infallible? An Inquiry, and historian Garry Wills, author of Papal Sin, have refused to accept papal infallibility as a matter of faith. Küng was sanctioned by the Church by being excluded from teaching Catholic theology. Brian Tierney agreed with Küng, whom he cites, and concluded: "There is no convincing evidence that papal infallibility formed any part of the theological or canonical tradition of the church before the thirteenth century; the doctrine was invented in the first place by a few dissident Franciscans because it suited their convenience to invent it; eventually, but only after much initial reluctance, it was accepted by the papacy because it suited the convenience of the popes to accept it." Garth Hallett, "drawing on a previous study of Wittgenstein's treatment of word meaning", argued that the dogma of infallibility is neither true nor false but meaningless; in practice, he claims, the dogma seems to have no practical use and to have succumbed to the sense that it is irrelevant.

In 1995, the Catholic feminist writer Margaret Hebblethwaite remarked:

If in 1995 no one pays much attention when Rome bangs its fist and says "This is infallible", then what can we conclude? We can conclude that we are witnessing what may be the biggest decline of papal authority in real terms ever seen in history.

Catholic priest August Bernhard Hasler (d. 3 July 1980) wrote a detailed analysis of the First Vatican Council, presenting the passage of the infallibility definition as orchestrated. Roger O'Toole described Hasler's work as follows:

1. It weakens or demolishes the claim that papal infallibility was already a universally accepted truth, and that its formal definition merely made de jure what had long been acknowledged de facto.
2. It emphasizes the extent of resistance to the definition, particularly in France and Germany.
3. It clarifies the "inopportunist" position as largely a polite fiction and notes how it was used by Infallibilists to trivialize the nature of the opposition to papal claims.
4. It indicates the extent to which "spontaneous popular demand" for the definition was, in fact, carefully orchestrated.
5. It underlines the personal involvement of the pope who, despite his coy disclaimers, appears as the prime mover and driving force behind the Infallibilist campaign.
6. It details the lengths to which the papacy was prepared to go in wringing formal 'submissions' from the minority even after their defeat in the council.
7. It offers insight into the ideological basis of the dogma in European political conservatism, monarchism, and counter-revolution.
8. It establishes the doctrine as a key contributing element in the present "crisis" of the Roman Catholic Church.

Mark E. Powell, in his examination of the topic from a Protestant point of view, writes: "August Hasler portrays Pius IX as an uneducated, abusive megalomaniac, and Vatican I as a council that was not free. Hasler, though, is engaged in heated polemic and obviously exaggerates his picture of Pius IX. Accounts like Hasler's, which paint Pius IX and Vatican I in the most negative terms, are adequately refuted by the testimony of participants at Vatican I."

=== Objections by Protestants ===
Those opposed to papal infallibility such as Geisler and MacKenzie say that it is contrary to Scripture and to the teaching of the early Church.

- On linguistic grounds and their understanding that Peter's authority was shared, James Robert White and others say that Matthew 16:18 does not refer to Peter as the Rock. They argue that in this passage Peter is in the second person ("you"), but that "this rock", being in the third person, refers to Christ, the subject of Peter's truth confession in verse 16, and the revelation referred to in verse 17, who is explicitly affirmed to be the foundation of the church. White cites authorities such as John Chrysostom and St. Augustine of Hippo as supporting this understanding, with Augustine stating, "On this rock, therefore, He said, which thou hast confessed. I will build my Church. For the Rock (petra) is Christ; and on this foundation was Peter himself built."
- They understand "keys" in the Matthean passage and its authority as primarily or exclusively pertaining to the gospel.
- They see the prayer of Jesus for Peter, that his faith fail not (Luke 22:32), as not promising infallibility to a papal office, which they hold to be a late and novel doctrine.
- While recognizing Peter's significant role in the early church, and his initial brethren-type leadership, they contend that the Book of Acts manifests him as inferior to the apostle Paul in his level of contribution and influence, with Paul becoming the dominant focus in the Biblical records of the early church, and the writer of most of the New Testament (receiving direct revelation), and having authority to publicly reprove Peter (Galatians 2:11–14).
- Geisler and MacKenzie also see the absence of any reference by Peter referring to himself distinctively, such as the chief of apostles, and instead only as "an apostle" or "an elder" (1 Peter 1:1; 5:1) as weighing against Peter being the supreme and infallible head of the church universal, and indicating he would not accept such titles as Holy Father.
- They say that the revelatory function connected to the office of the high priest Caiaphas (John 11:49–52) does not establish a precedent for Petrine infallibility, since (among other reasons) they infer from Revelation 22:18 that there is no new revelation after the time of the New Testament, as held also by Catholics.
- Likewise, they hold that no Jewish infallible magisterium existed, but the faith yet endured, and that the Roman Catholic doctrine on infallibility is a new invention.
- They see the promise of papal infallibility as violated by certain popes who spoke heresy (as recognized, they say, by the Roman church itself) under conditions that, they argue, fit the criteria for infallibility.
- They say that at the Council of Jerusalem Peter was not looked to as the infallible head of the church, with James exercising the more decisive leadership, and providing the definitive sentence; and that he is not seen elsewhere as the final and universal arbiter about any doctrinal dispute about faith in the life of the church.
- They hold as unwarranted on scriptural and historical grounds the idea that monarchical leadership by an infallible pope is needed or has existed; that the infallible authority is the scriptures rather than an infallible head. and that church leadership in the New Testament is understood as being that of bishops and elders, denoting the same office, rather than an infallible pope.
- They argue further that the doctrine of papal infallibility lacked universal or widespread support in the bulk of church history, and that substantial opposition to it existed within the Catholic Church, even at the time of its official institution, saying that this testifies to its lack of scriptural and historical warrant.
- Chapter 7 of Lytton Strachey's biography of Cardinal Manning in Eminent Victorians includes a discussion of papal infallibility and some possible objections.

== Positions of some other churches ==
=== Eastern Orthodoxy ===
The dogma of papal infallibility is rejected by Eastern Orthodoxy for similar reasons. Eastern Orthodox Christians hold that the Holy Spirit will not allow the whole Body of Orthodox Christians to fall into error but leave open the question of how this will be ensured in any specific case.

=== Anglican churches ===
The Church of England and its sister churches in the Anglican Communion reject papal infallibility, a rejection given expression in the Thirty-Nine Articles of Religion (1571):

XIX. Of the Church. The visible Church of Christ is a congregation of faithful men, in which the pure Word of God is preached, and the Sacraments be duly ministered according to Christ's ordinance, in all those things that of necessity are requisite to the same. As the Church of Jerusalem, Alexandria, and Antioch, have erred, so also the Church of Rome hath erred, not only in their living and manner of Ceremonies, but also in matters of Faith.

XXI. Of the Authority of General Councils. General Councils may not be gathered together without the commandment and will of Princes. And when they be gathered together, (forasmuch as they be an assembly of men, whereof all be not governed with the Spirit and Word of God,) they may err, and sometimes have erred, even in things pertaining unto God. Wherefore things ordained by them as necessary to salvation have neither strength nor authority, unless it may be declared that they be taken out of holy Scripture.

=== Methodist Churches ===
John Wesley amended the Anglican Articles of Religion for use by Methodists, particularly those in America. The Methodist Articles omit the express provisions in the Anglican articles concerning the errors of the Church of Rome and the authority of councils, but retain Article V, which implicitly pertains to the Roman Catholic idea of papal authority as capable of defining articles of faith on matters not clearly derived from Scripture:

V. Of the Sufficiency of the Holy Scriptures for Salvation. The Holy Scripture containeth all things necessary to salvation; so that whatsoever is not read therein, nor may be proved thereby, is not to be required of any man that it should be believed as an article of faith, or be thought requisite or necessary to salvation.

=== Reformed churches ===
Presbyterian and Reformed churches reject papal infallibility. The Westminster Confession of Faith, which was intended in 1646 to replace the Thirty-Nine Articles, goes so far as to label the Roman pontiff "Antichrist"; it contains the following statements:

(Chapter one) IX. The infallible rule of interpretation of Scripture is the Scripture itself: and therefore, when there is a question about the true and full sense of any Scripture (which is not manifold, but one), it must be searched and known by other places that speak more clearly.

(Chapter one) X. The supreme judge by which all controversies of religion are to be determined, and all decrees of councils, opinions of ancient writers, doctrines of men, and private spirits, are to be examined, and in whose sentence we are to rest, can be no other but the Holy Spirit speaking in the Scripture.

(Chapter Twenty-Five) VI. There is no other head of the Church but the Lord Jesus Christ. Nor can the Pope of Rome, in any sense, be head thereof; but is that Antichrist, that man of sin, and son of perdition, that exalts himself, in the Church, against Christ and all that is called God.

=== Evangelical churches ===
Evangelical churches do not believe in papal infallibility for reasons similar to those of Methodist and Reformed Christians. Evangelicals believe that the Bible alone is infallible or inerrant.

=== Non-Christian equivalents ===
Sunni Islam stated the infallibility of the prophets and the Quran, but did not point to a particular authority in the present time as infallible. Shia Islam recognizes the family of Muhammad (Ahl al-Bayt) as Imams divinely chosen with the privileges of sinlessness and infallibility. Many Sunni Sufi claim to be initiated masters and spiritual heirs of the prophet and thus are associated by the believers to the same infallibility.

== Political reactions ==
=== British ===
A British prime minister, William Ewart Gladstone, publicly attacked Vatican I, stating that Roman Catholics had "forfeited their moral and mental freedom". He published a pamphlet called The Vatican Decrees in their Bearing on Civil Allegiance in which he described the Catholic Church as "an Asian monarchy: nothing but one giddy height of despotism, and one dead level of religious subservience". He further claimed that the pope wanted to destroy the rule of law and replace it with arbitrary tyranny, and then hide these "crimes against liberty beneath a suffocating cloud of incense." Cardinal Newman famously responded with his Letter to the Duke of Norfolk. In the letter he argues that conscience, which is supreme, is not in conflict with papal infallibility – though he toasts, "I shall drink to the Pope if you please – still, to conscience first and to the Pope afterwards." Newman argued that since it is "never lawful to go against our conscience", and conscience bears upon making a specific decision on "something to be done or not done", while papal infallibility bears upon abstract doctrine and sometimes the condemnation of particular errors, the two do not directly collide. He stated later that "The Vatican Council left the Pope just as it found him", satisfied that the definition was very moderate, and specific in regards to what specifically can be declared as infallible.

=== Bismarck ===
According to F. B. M. Hollyday, Chancellor Otto von Bismarck feared that Pius IX and future popes would use the infallibility dogma as a weapon for promoting a potential "papal desire for international political hegemony":

Bismarck's attention was also riveted by fear of what he believed to be the desire of the international Catholic Church to control national Germany by means of the papal claim of infallibility, announced in 1870. If, as has been argued, there was no papal desire for international political hegemony, and Bismarck's resistance to it may be described as shadowboxing, many statesmen of the time were of the chancellor's persuasion. The result was the Kulturkampf, which, with its largely Prussian measures, complemented by similar actions in several other German states, sought to curb the clerical danger by legislation restricting the Catholic Church's political power.

One example of the Catholic Church's political actions had already occurred in Italy on 29 February 1868, when the Sacred Penitentiary issued the decree Non Expedit, which declared that a Catholic should be "neither elector nor elected" in the Kingdom of Italy. The principal motive of this decree was that the oath taken by deputies might be interpreted as an approval of the spoliation of the Holy See, as Pius IX declared in an audience of 11 October 1874. Only in 1888 was the decree declared to be an absolute prohibition rather than an admonition meant for one particular occasion.

In 1872 Bismarck attempted to reach an understanding with other European governments, whereby future papal elections would be manipulated. He proposed that European governments should agree beforehand on unsuitable papal candidates, and then instruct their national cardinals to vote in the appropriate manner. This plan was circulated in a note, in which Bismarck wrote:

The concordats already concluded at the beginning of the century produced direct and, to some extent, intimate relations between the Pope and governments, but, above all, the Vatican Council, and both its most important statements about infallibility and about the jurisdiction of the Pope, also entirely altered his position in relation to the governments. Their interest in the election – but with that their right to concern themselves with it – was also given a much firmer basis. For, by these decisions, the Pope has come into the position of assuming episcopal rights in every single diocese and of substituting papal for episcopal power. Episcopal has merged into papal jurisdiction; the Pope no longer exercises, as heretofore, individual stipulated special privileges, but the entire plenitude of episcopal rights rests in his hands. In principle, he has taken the place of each individual bishop, and, in practice, at every single moment, it is up to him alone to put himself in the former's position in relation to the governments. Further the bishops are only his tools, his officials without responsibility. In relation to the governments, they have become officials of a foreign sovereign, and, to be sure, a sovereign who, by virtue of his infallibility, is a completely absolute one – more so than any absolute monarch in the world. Before the governments concede such a position to a new Pope and grant him the exercise of such rights, they must ask themselves whether the election and person chosen offer the guarantees they are justified in demanding against the misuse of such rights.

== See also ==
- Lord Acton – opposed the doctrine
- Papal primacy
- Papal supremacy
- Ultramontanism
- Syllabus of Errors – an encyclical issued by the Holy See under Pope Pius IX on 8 December 1864.
- Sola scriptura
- Union of Utrecht (Old Catholic)
- Infallibility of the Church

== Bibliography ==
- Bermejo, Luis (1990). Infallibility on Trial: Church, Conciliarity and Communion. imprimi potest by Julian Fernandes, Provincial of India. Christian Classics. ISBN 0-87061-190-9.
- Chirico, Peter (1983). Infallibility: The Crossroads of Doctrine. M. Glazier. ISBN 0-89453-296-0.
- De Cesare, Raffaele (1909). The Last Days of Papal Rome. London: Archibald Constable & Co. p. 449. "the last days of papal rome."
- Gaillardetz, Richard (2003). By What Authority?: A Primer on Scripture, the Magisterium, and the Sense of the Faithful. Liturgical Press. ISBN 0-8146-2872-9.
- Hasler, Bernhard (1981). How the Pope became infallible: Pius IX and the Politics of Persuasion. Doubleday. ISBN 978-0-385-15851-0. Translation of Hasler, Bernhard (1979). Wie der Papst unfehlbar wurde: Macht und Ohnmacht eines Dogmas (in German). R. Piper & Co. Verlag.
- Küng, Hans (1983). Infallible?: An inquiry. Doubleday. ISBN 0-385-18483-2.
- Lio, Ermenegildo (1986). Humanae vitae e infallibilità: Paolo VI, il Concilio e Giovanni Paolo II (Teologia e filosofia) (in Italian). Libreria editrice vaticana. ISBN 88-209-1528-6.
- Mayr, Beda (1789/2023). A Defense of the Catholic Religion: The Necessity, Existence, and Limits of an Infallible Church. translated by Ulrich L. Lehner. Washington, DC: Catholic University of America Press. ISBN 978-0813237732.
- McClory, Robert (1997). Power and the Papacy: The People and Politics Behind the Doctrine of Infallibility. Triumph. ISBN 0-7648-0141-4.
- O'Connor, James (1986). The Gift of Infallibility: The Official Relatio on Infallibility of Bishop Vincent Gasser at Vatican Council I. St. Paul Editions. ISBN 0-8198-3042-9.
- Powell, Mark E (2009). Papal Infallibility: A Protestant Evaluation of an Ecumenical Issue. Wm. B. Eerdmans. ISBN 978-0-8028-6284-6.
- Sullivan, Francis (2003). Creative Fidelity: Weighing and Interpreting Documents of the Magisterium. Wipf and Stock Publishers. ISBN 1-59244-208-0.
- Sullivan, Francis (2002). The Magisterium: Teaching Authority in the Catholic Church. Wipf and Stock Publishers. ISBN 1-59244-060-6.
- Tierney, Brian (1972). Origins of Papal Infallibility, 1150–1350: A Study on the Concepts of Infallibility, Sovereignty and Tradition in the Middle Ages. E.J. Brill. ISBN 90-04-08884-9.
- Harkianakis, Stylianos (2008). The Infallibility of the Church in Orthodox Theology. Sydney: St Andrew's Orthodox Press. ISBN 978-1-920691-98-1.
