= 10.5 =

10.5 may refer to:

- 10.5 (miniseries), a television miniseries that aired on NBC in 2004
- 10.5: Apocalypse, the sequel to the 10.5 television miniseries
- Mac OS X Leopard, the sixth major release of Mac OS X, Apple's operating system for Macintosh computers
