= Nicolaï =

Nicolaï is a surname. Notable people with the surname include:

- Robert Nicolaï (born 1945), French linguist
- Atzo Nicolaï (1960–2020), Dutch politician and businessman
- Jean Nicolaï (1594–1673) French theologian
- Patricia de Nicolaï (born 1957), French perfumer
