= Gener =

Gener may refer to:

People:

- Tania Gener (born 1988), Spanish artistic gymnast
- Juan Guitéras y Gener (1852–1925), Cuban physician and pathologist
- Gener (Thomist writer), a Thomist writer of the 18th century
- Gene Ween

Other:

- Tropical Storm Gener (disambiguation)
- AES Gener, former name of AES Andes, a Chilean electricity producer and distributor

== See also ==
- Gene (disambiguation)
