= Ferre =

Ferre may refer to:

== People ==
=== Given name ===
- Ferré Gola (born 1976), Congolese singer
- Ferre Grignard (1939-1982), Belgian skiffle-singer
- Ferre Spruyt (born 1986), Belgian speed skater

=== Surname ===
- Adelaida Ferré Gomis (1881-1955), Catalan lace-maker
- Maurice Ferré (1935-2019), American politician
- Todd Rivaldo Ferre (born 1999), Indonesian footballer
- Vicente Ferre (died 1682), Spanish theologian

== Other uses ==
- Fer, the French wine grape that is also known as Ferre
