= Anthony Terill =

Anthony Terill (born 1623, Canford, Dorset, England – died 11 October 1676, Liège (present-day Belgium) was an English Roman Catholic Jesuit theologian.

Born in 1623 as Anthony Bonville to a Catholic mother and a Protestant father, in his 15th year, he was received into the Roman Catholic Church and left England, taking the surname Terill. He studied for about three years at the English College of St. Omer, and then began his studies for the priesthood at the English College, Rome, where he was ordained on 16 March 1687. Two months later he entered the Jesuit novitiate at St Andrea. After his noviceship, he was successively penitentiary at Loreto, professor of philosophy at Florence, professor of philosophy and scholastic theology at Parma, director of theological studies and professor of theology and mathematics at the English College, Liège, and for three years rector of the same college where he died with a reputation for "extraordinary piety, talent, learning, and prudence".

== Works ==
Terill wrote Conclusiones philosophicæ (Parma, 1657), Problema mathematico-philosophicum de termino magnitudinis se virium in animalibus (Parma, 1660), Fundamentum totius theologiæ moralis, seu tractatus de conscientia probabili (Liège, 1668), and Regula morum, which was published shortly after his death (Liège, 1677). His reputation as a moral theologian was established by these last two works. In the Fundamentum he ably defended the doctrine of probabilism and in the Regula morum refuted the objections brought against his first work by the Dominican Concina, the Jesuit Miguel de Elizalde (1617-1678) and other exponents of the Rigorist School. Amort speaks of him as "eruditissimum et probabilistarum antsignanum".
