= 1569 in literature =

This article contains information about the literary events and publications of 1569.

== Events ==
- September 28 – First complete printed Bible in Spanish translation (La Biblia, known from its title-page illustration as "Biblia del Oso" ("Bible of the Bear")), made by Casiodoro de Reina, published in Basel.
- undated – Performance of the 14th-century York Mystery Plays in England is suppressed.

== New books ==
=== Prose ===
- Henry de Bracton (died c. 1268) – De legibus & consuetudinibus Angliæ (On the Laws and Customs of England), first printed
- Robert Henryson (died c. 1500) – The Morall Fabillis of Esope the Phrygian, publication begins
- Magdeburge Centurien (Magdeburg Centuries), volume XII
- Philips of Marnix, Lord of Saint-Aldegonde – Biëncorf der Heilige Roomsche Kercke (Beehive of the Holy Roman Church, satire)

=== Drama ===
- Thomas Preston – A lamentable tragedy mixed ful of pleaſant mirth, conteyning the life of Cambises King of Percia ("Cambyses", publication)

=== Poetry ===
- See 1569 in poetry
- Alonso de Ercilla – La Araucana, part 1

== Births ==
- January 2 – Heribert Rosweyde, Netherlandish hagiographer (died 1629)
- April 16 – Sir John Davies, English poet (died 1626)
- c. December? – Henry Ainsworth, English theologian (died 1622)
- Unknown dates
  - Guillén de Castro y Bellvis, Spanish dramatist (died 1631)
  - Hŏ Kyun, Korean politician, scholar, and writer (died 1618)
  - Emilia Lanier, English poet (died 1645)
  - Hieronymus Medices, Italian philosopher and editor of work of Thomas Aquinas
  - Piotr Zbylitowski, Polish poet and satirist (died 1649)
- probable – Barnabe Barnes, English poet and dramatist (baptised 1571; died 1609)

== Deaths ==
- January 20 – Myles Coverdale, English Bible translator (born c. 1488)
- May 10 – Saint John of Avila, Spanish preacher and author (born 1500)
- September 5 – Bernardo Tasso, Italian poet (born 1493)
- September/October – Mikołaj Rej, Polish poet and author (born 1505)
- November 29 – António Ferreira, Portuguese poet (born 1528)
- Unknown date – Georg Pictorius, German physician and author (born c. 1500)
