= 10.5: Apocalypse =

2006 television miniseries directed by John Lafia

- Written by: John Lafia
- Directed by: John Lafia
- Starring: Kim Delaney; David Cubitt; Dean Cain; Carlos Bernard; Frank Langella; Beau Bridges
- Theme music composer: Henning Lohner
- Country of origin: United States
- Original language: English

Production
- Producer: Randi Richmond
- Cinematography: David Loreman
- Editors: Don Brochu; Martin Nicholson
- Running time: 169 minutes
- Production companies: Hallmark Entertainment; Muse Entertainment

Original release
- Network: NBC; USA Network
- Release: May 21 – May 23, 2006

10.5: Apocalypse is a 2006 television miniseries written and directed by John Lafia. A sequel to 2004's 10.5, the show follows a series of catastrophic seismic disasters including earthquakes, volcanic eruptions, tsunamis, and sinkholes, all triggered by an apocalyptic earthquake. The series was produced in Canada. It received primarily negative reviews.

== Plot ==
=== Part 1 ===
A minor earthquake in Seattle forms the trigger to a magnitude 10.5 earthquake which destroys San Francisco and then Los Angeles. (Note: As depicted in 10.5 (2004)) The earthquake creates fault lines in the sea floor, which in turn creates a massive tsunami which capsizes a large cruise ship (which heavily resembles the Queen Mary 2) and causes massive damage to Honolulu, Hawaii. It turns out to be only the first of a series of seismic events, including the awakening of an extinct volcano in Sun Valley, Idaho and sudden instability of aquifers in Monument Valley. Deforestation takes place at Kings Peak, Utah, and Hoover Dam in Boulder City, Nevada collapses when Lake Mead starts to heat up and expand beyond the spillway's capacity. Las Vegas, Nevada is then destroyed when acidic water undermines underground limestone, creating a massive sinkhole which causes many buildings to simply sink into the sand. The worst of the seismic events is a massive fault which opens up under South Dakota, destroying Mount Rushmore in the process, and begins to travel southward towards the Gulf of Mexico.

The geologists at the United States Geological Survey in Colorado do not understand why seismic events that are very rare or impossible would be happening so rapidly, but Dr. Samantha Hill remembers that her father had once theorized that the Earth's tectonic plates would reach a point of maximum separation, at which point they would reverse direction. The theory also states that related seismic activity would be vastly accelerated during the initial period of reversal. However, Dr. Earl Hill had been ostracized by the USGS for that theory, and had abandoned geology to become a successful professional poker player. When Las Vegas sinks into the ground, he is caught in the casino of the (fictional) Atlas Hotel. Samantha concludes that the massive faultline traveling towards the Gulf of Mexico threatens to re-create the Western Interior Seaway when it reaches the ocean.

=== Part 2 ===
The second part of the miniseries begins with Dr. Hill's rescue from the ruins of the Atlas Hotel just before it is swallowed up completely. At the same time, a massive fault line forms in North Dakota, passing through South Dakota, Nebraska, Kansas, and Oklahoma. If it reaches Houston, Texas and the Gulf of Mexico, as predicted, the Midwestern United States will be covered by a new ocean. A massive evacuation of the region is ordered, as an earthquake strikes Sedona, Arizona destroying the Chapel of the Holy Cross in the process. Also, 467 miles from Red Plains, the fault destroys a farm with animals inside and destroys a windmill sending the wheel flying.

25 miles from Red Plains, another farm is destroyed.

However, a nuclear plant in fictional Red Plains, Texas, is right in the fault's path. If it is destroyed, the entire area and hundreds of miles around will be contaminated by nuclear waste.

Dr. Earl Hill comes up with a desperate plan to divert the fault around the nuclear plant by opening up a secondary fault running east, by a controlled demolition which explosively ignites the massive natural gas reserves in the area. The main fault follows the new path around Red Plains, saving the nuclear plant, and comes to a halt. The scientists at the USGS cheer, only to find that nothing can stop the fault altogether. Once again it turns south, slicing through the middle of Houston to reach the Gulf of Mexico, while the northern end of the fault reaches Hudson Bay. However, the end result of the fault is different from what the USGS had expected: when the waters rush into the fault, instead of flooding the entire area, they create a new riverlike seaway that splits the United States and Canada in half. The President declares that although the country is now divided geographically, the American people will not be divided spiritually.

== Cast ==
- Kim Delaney as Dr. Samantha "Sam" Hill
- Glenda Braganza as Gina Green
- Dean Cain as Brad Malloy
- David Cubitt as Dr. Jordan Fisher
- Garcelle Beauvais-Nilon as Natalie Warner
- Carlos Bernard as Dr. Miguel Garcia
- Oliver Hudson as Will Malloy
- Carly Pope as Laura Malloy
- Frank Langella as Dr. Earl Hill
- Beau Bridges as President of the United States Paul Hollister
- Melissa Sue Anderson as First Lady Mrs. Hollister
- Tamara Hope as First Daughter Amy Hollister
- Francis X. McCarthy as Al Roberts
- Barbara Eve Harris as Stacy Warner, FEMA Director
- Peter Outerbridge as Alec Becker
- John Cassini as Sean Morris, Hollister's Aide
- Tyrone Benskin as Jackson the Bartender
- Mark Camacho as Russ the Poker Player
- Russell Yuen as Ian
- Natalie Brown as Paula
- Anna Jaeger as Jenna
- Louis-Philippe Dandenault as Chet
- Cecile Cristobal as Allison
- David Schaap as Jim
- Maurizio Terrazzano as Gonzalez
- Sean Tucker as Demo Team Leader
- Meaghan Rath as Rachel
- Jesse Aaron Dwyre as Dr. Josh Nolan
- Ian Finlay as Cruise Ship Captain (as Ian Finley)
- Andrew Peplowski as Anchor #1
- Natasha Gargiulo as Anchor #2
- Al Dubois as Anchor #3
- Aphrodite Sahlas as Anchor #4
- Isabel Dos Santos as Irena Garcia
- Manuel Aranguiz as Nando Garcia
- Daniel Tirado as Communications Soldier
- Malcolm Travis as Field Commander
- Claudia Besso as K9 Handler
- Richard Jutras as Buried Survivor
- Chris Lawrence as USGS Pilot
- Tony Calabretta as Security Guard
- Melissa Carter as Park Ranger #1
- Brett Watson as Park Ranger #2 Maéva Nadon
- Maéva Nadon as Little Girl
- Andrew W. Walker as Sgt. Corbel
- Stewart Myiow as Navajo Indian
- Raynald Lapierre as Patient #1
- Jean Nicolai as Geologist #1
- Lori Graham as Helicopter Reporter
- Jere Gillis as Casino Patron
- David McKeown as Casino Patron
- Abdul Ayoola as Casino Patron
- Ruth Chiang as Casino Patron
- France Raymond as Casino Patron
- Kane Lafia as Refugee Boy
- Melantha Blackthorne as Tsunami Victim (uncredited)
- Brandon Blue as Rescuer (uncredited)
- James Hutson as Nolan's Aide (uncredited)
- David Rigby as Five Star General (uncredited)

== Production ==
10.5: Apocalypse began filming in Montreal, Quebec, Canada in June 2005. A sequel to 10.5, the miniseries used much of the same staff, headed by returning executive producers Howard Braunstein, Michael Jaffe, and Gary Pearl. Director John Lafia, who also wrote script, decided to film the sequel using digital media, stating that it would allow the producers "to achieve a whole new level of visual effects and style that have heretofore not been seen on network television."

The Sun Valley, Idaho scene was filmed at the Mont Tremblant Resort, a popular skiing resort north of the city. All of the news reporters that appeared on TV in the film are all local news reporters for various news stations in Montreal. The visual effects for the movie were created by visual effects company "Hybride", which is based in Piedmont, Quebec.

== Reception ==
The series was critically panned, and received a 23 out of 100 on metacritic.com. Gillian Flynn at EW.com wrote, "Everything about the [miniseries] is so lousy, it's difficult to pick just one failure." Dorothy Rabinowitz wrote in Wall Street Journal's website, "10.5: Apocalypse is visually dazzling, relentlessly hysterical and also a sequel, which means that most viewers sitting down to watch it know what they're getting into. That should damp down any untoward expectations -- the appearance of a believable character, for instance, or piece of dialogue, neither of which, be assured, is to be found here."
