= John Cassini =

Canadian actor

John Cassini (born in Toronto) is a Canadian actor.

== Career ==
Cassini appeared in the 1995 Brad Pitt film Seven. He starred in the 2005 film Cool Money. Cassini starred as Ronnie Delmarco on the CBC series Intelligence, which was cancelled on March 7, 2008.

He guest-starred in the CW series Arrow and on the USA network original series Motive in April 2016.

Cassini appeared in and is listed as a producer of the film Guido Superstar: The Rise of Guido, starring, produced, and directed by Silvio Pollio, including, Nicholas Lea, Terry Chen, and Michael Eklund. The film screened at the 2010 Vancouver International Film Festival.

== Filmography ==
=== Film ===
Year	Title	Role	Notes
1991	Cafe Romeo	Romeo	
1992	North of Pittsburgh	Gus	
1992	A Passion for Murder	Cab passenger	Uncredited
1993	Alive	Daniel Fernández	
1993	Man's Best Friend	Detective Bendetti	
1995	Dream Man	George Mancuso	Direct-to-video
1995	Seven	Officer Davis	
1995	For a Few Lousy Dollars	Man #3	
1995	Point Dume	Tom Styles	
1996	Female Perversions	Gas Station Attendant	
1996	White Tiger	Watt	
1997	The Game	Man in Airport	
1998	Halloween H20: 20 Years Later	Cop #1	
1998	The Falling	Simon	
2000	Chain of Fools	Henchman	
2000	Get Carter	Thorpey	
2001	The Whole Shebang	Father Jerry	
2001	Shot in the Face	Ken	
2003	Love Object	Jason	
2003	Paycheck	Agent Mitchell	
2004	Catwoman	Graphologist	
2005	Window Theory	Officer Adamson	
2005	Break a Leg	Max Matteo	
2005	Chaos	Bernie Callo	
2006	Love and Other Dilemmas	Bart Ladro	
2008	Vice	Travalino	
2010	The Traveler	Deputy Jack Hawkins	
2010	Repeaters	Lt. Howard	
2010	Guido Superstar: The Rise of Guido	Mr. Blanco	
2011	Hamlet	Butler	
2012	Hit 'n Strum	Male Radio Host	Uncredited
2012	The Possession	Stephanie's Attorney	
2012	Crimes of Mike Recket	Terry	
2013	The Resurrection of Tony Gitone	Leo	
2013	The Dick Knost Show	David	
2013	3 Days in Havana	Francis Libby	
2013	Leap 4 Your Life	John	
2014	The Grim Sleeper	Bob Lesser	
2016	The Orchard	Clive Roth	
2017	The Layover	Chuck	
2018	In God I Trust	Michael	
2019	A Dog's Way Home	Chuck Millits	
2019	Volition	Ray	
2019	True Fiction	Caleb Conrad	
2019	Daughter	Jim	
2020	Broil	February Sinclair	
2022	Hot in Love	Chief Reed	
2022	Detective Knight: Redemption	Mayor Vassetti	
2023	Double Life	Louis Strand	

=== Television ===
Year	Title	Role	Notes
1989	Wiseguy	Wiseguy #2	2 episodes
1989, 1990	Booker	Paradise Desk Clerk / Bartender	2 episodes
1991	The Girl from Mars	Stumpy	Television film
1991	Payoff	Simple Sanchez	Television film
1991	The Commish	Artie Briggs	Episode: "In the Best of Families"
1991	The Adventures of the Black Stallion	Phil	Episode: "Killer Stallion"
1991	Christmas on Division Street	White	Television film
1992	Home Movie	Bartender	Television film
1994	Birdland	Dr Vincent Cassini	Episode: "Crazy for You"
1994	Motorcycle Gang	Crab	Television film
1994	Diagnosis: Murder	Marco	Episode: "Standing Eight Count"
1994, 2000	NYPD Blue	Joey Ficca / Leo Cooper	2 episodes
1995	ER	Zamboni Driver	Episode: "A Miracle Happens Here"
1997	Two	Bobby Guthrie	Episode: "The Nun Story"
1997	Mike Hammer, Private Eye	Slick	Episode: "Sins of the Fathers"
1998	The Spree	Ray Costello	Television film
1998, 1999	Brimstone	Mel / Cal	2 episodes
1999–2005	Da Vinci's Inquest	Various roles	13 episodes
2000	The Practice	Clyde Miller	Episode: "Race Ipsa Loquitor"
2001	Some of My Best Friends	Johnnie	Episode: "Fight Night"
2001	Emeril	Sammy	Episode: "The Sopranos Come to Dinner"
2001	Dark Angel	Blond Cop	Episode: "Two"
2002	Wolf Lake	Eddie	Episode: "Leader of the Pack"
2003	The Handler	Lou Renato	2 episodes
2004	Traffic	DEA Agent #2	3 episodes
2004	Andromeda	Moldar	Episode: "The Spider's Stratagem"
2004	Kingdom Hospital	Geoffrey Wilkster	Episode: "Black Noise"
2004	10.5	Sean Morris, Hollister's Aide	2 episodes
2004	The Life	Victor Pinto	Television film
2005	Cool Money	Sammy Nalo	Television film
2005–2007	Intelligence	Ronnie Delmonico	26 episodes
2005–2008	Robson Arms	Yuri Kukoc	31 episodes
2006	10.5: Apocalypse	Sean Morris, Hollister's Aide	2 episodes
2006	Northern Town	Meadows	Television film
2006	Alice, I Think	MacGee	2 episodes
2006	Final Days of Planet Earth	Jake Roth	2 episodes
2007	Dragon Boys	Reg Deever	2 episodes
2008	Eleventh Hour	Alan Pulido	Episode: "Containment"
2010	The Bridge	Max Rytell	3 episodes
2010	Smoke Screen	Sam	Television film
2010	Fringe	The Librarian	Episode: "Entrada"
2011	Human Target	Jerry Mobbs	Episode: "Cool Hand Guerrero"
2011	Shattered	Det. Bruce Catelli	Episode: "Unaired Pilot"
2011	The Chicago Code	Deputy Chief Samuels	Episode: "Black Hand and the Shotgun Man"
2011	A Trusted Man	Detective Curtis	Television film
2012	Arrow	Mr. Russo	Episode: "Muse of Fire"
2013	Twist of Faith	Detective Frank Davis	Television film
2013	Fatal Performance	Wallace River / David McWilliams	Television film
2013–2014	Continuum	Marco	8 episodes
2013–2015	Blackstone	Detective Platt	8 episodes
2014	Bates Motel	Max Borowitz	Episode: "Presumed Innocent"
2014	The Memory Book	Vito Marino Jr.	Television film
2015	Motive	Peter Glass	Episode: "The Glass House"
2015	Reluctant Witness	Agent Troy Rolands	Television film
2016	Love by Chance	Marco	Television film
2016	Undercover Wife	Isaac Norton	Television film
2016	Signed, Sealed, Delivered: Lost Without You	Director	Television film
2018	Deadly Deed: A Fixer Upper Mystery	Jim Hopkins	Television film
2018, 2019	Van Helsing	Maddox	2 episodes
2020	Next	Ron Mathis	4 episodes
2020–2021	Tribal	Jimmy Ganz	4 episodes
2021	The Long Island Serial Killer: A Mother's Hunt for Justice	Detective Dominick Varrone	Television film
2021	The Secret Lives of College Freshmen	Detective Phillips	Television film
2022	The Imperfects	Dr. Brian Yake	Episode #1.3
2025	Watson	Dr. Ivan Ferry	6 episodes
