= Dominic of Flanders =

French-Flemish Dominican philosopher and Scholastic author

Dominicus de Flandria, O. P. (Dominic of Flanders)
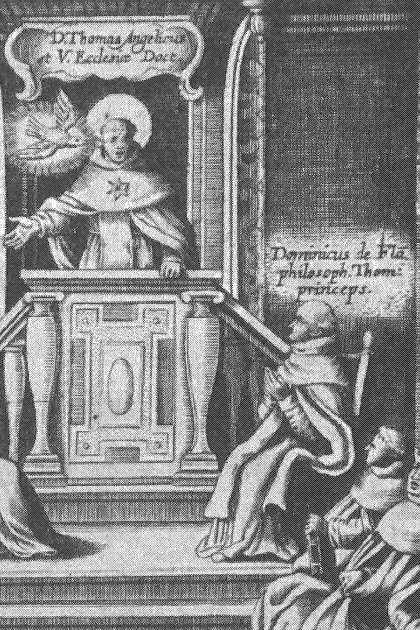
- Flanders (seated) depicted in Questiones super XII libros Metaphysica (Köln, 1621)
- Born: Baudouin Lottin ca. 1425; French Flanders
- Died: 16 July 1479; Florence
- Other names: Dominique de Flandre, Domenico di Fiandra

Philosophical work
- Era: Middle Ages, Renaissance
- Region: Western philosophy
- School: Scholasticism, Thomism
- Main interests: Metaphysics, Natural Philosophy

Dominic of Flanders OP (Latin: Dominicus de Flandria, French: Dominique de Flandre; c. 1425 – 16 July 1479) was a French-Flemish Dominican philosopher and Scholastic author, known to have been a renowned Thomist. His commentaries on Aristotle and on Thomas Aquinas were frequently printed, the most famous being his commentary on Aristotle’s Metaphysics. This Commentaria is commonly known to have been dedicated to Lorenzo de’ Medici.

== Life ==
Little is known of Dominic's early life. He was born Baudouin Lottin, in the north of France near what is today the Belgian border, in either Merville or Merris, a few kilometers away from Bailleul. The political circumstances of the region at the time are such that it is possible to deem him neither a Flemish nor a French philosopher. While born in present-day France (in the region of Lille), it was indeed the County of Flanders during the 15th century, a bilingual region which politically belonged to the Kingdom of France.

Baudouin studied at the University of Paris, becoming a Master of Arts at some time before 1452. At Paris he studied with John Versor, and would receive philosophical training according to the trend of "Albertism." The first known date in the life of Baudouin is 7 September 1461 — the day he took the Dominican habit (as well as the name, Dominic of Flanders, following the practice of the Order) at Bologna. Dominic's intellectual home would remain in Italy. At Bologna, it is likely that he studied under Peter of Bergamo (†1482), where he would switch from Albertist views to Thomism. He taught at Bologna from 1462 to 1470. He went on to teach in Florence and Pisa, by the invitation of Lorenzo de' Medici, then returned to Bologna from 1475 to 1476. He finally returned to Florence, where he died of the plague on 16 July 1479.

== Works ==
- Summa philosophiae sermocinalis (no longer extant)
- Quaestiones in Analytica priora (no longer extant)
- Quaestiones articulatae super libros Analyticorum posteriorum
- Super praedicamenta
- Expositio super tract. Thomae de Aquino De Fallaciis
- Quaestiones super VI principia (no longer extant)
- Tractatus de modalibus (no longer extant)
- Commentarium in Summulas Petri Hispani
- Tractatus de suppositionibus
- Questiones in libros Physicorum (no longer extant)
- Recollectio super libros De Anima
- Questiones super XII libros Metaphysica, seu Summa Divinae Philosophiae
- Summa philosophiae moralis (no longer extant)
- Quaestiones quodliberales (no longer extant)
- Epistulae II ad Laurentium Petri de Medicis

== Bibliography ==
- Bonino, S.-T. “L’école thomiste au XVe siècle.” Rivista teologica di Lugano 5 (2000): 223–234.
- Colosio, O. P., I. “La «Tabula Aurea» di Pietro da Bergamo.” Divus Thomas 64 (1961): 120–32.
- Garcia, B., “Interiority and Human Experience: Dominicus de Flandria on the Interior Senses.” Revista Española de Filosofía Medieval 22 (2015): 219–37.
- Kaeppeli, O. P., T. Scriptores Ordinis Praedicatorum Medii Aevi, Vol. I. Romae ad S. Sabinae, 1970, 315–318.
- Kristeller, P. O. “Thomism and the Italian Thought of the Renaissance.” In Medieval Aspects of Renaissance Learning, edited and translated by E. Mahoney, 29–91. Durham, 1974.
- Mahieu, L. Dominique de Flandre (15e siècle): Sa Métaphysique. Paris: Vrin, 1942.
- Meersseman, O. P., G. “Een Vlaamsch Wijsgeer: Dominicus van Vlaanderen.” Thomistisch Tijdschrift voor Katholiek Kultuurleven 1 (1930): 385–400.
- Schikowski, U. “Dominicus de Flandria O. P. (†1479) Seine Schriften, Seine Bedeutung.” Archivum Fratrum Praedicatorum 10 (1940): 169–221.
- Steel, C. “From Siger of Brabant to Erasmus: Philosophy and Civilization in the Late Medieval Low Countries,” in Philosophy and Theology in the Long Middle Ages: A Tribute to Stephen F. Brown, edited by K. Emery, Jr., R. L. Friedman, & A. Speer, 953–979. Leiden/Boston: Brill, 2011.
- Verde, O. P., A. F. "Domenico di Fiandra: Intransigente Tomista non Gradito nello Studio Fiorentino." Memorie Domenicane 93 (1976): 304–321.

== See also ==
- Jean Capréolus (†1444)
- Henry of Gorkum (†1431)
- Heymeric de Campo (†1460)
- Peter of Bergamo (†1482)
- Paulus Barbus (Soncinas) (†1494)
- Sylvester Mazzolini (†1523)
- Thomas de Vio Cajetan (†1534)
