= Man's Best Friend (1993 film) =

1993 film by John Lafia

- Theatrical release poster
- Directed by: John Lafia
- Written by: John Lafia
- Produced by: Robert Engelman; Robert Kosberg; Dan Grodnik
- Starring: Ally Sheedy; Lance Henriksen; Frederic Lehne; Robert Costanzo
- Cinematography: Mark Irwin
- Edited by: Nancy Frazen; Michael N. Knue
- Music by: Joel Goldsmith
- Production company: Roven-Cavallo Entertainment
- Distributed by: New Line Cinema
- Release date: November 19, 1993
- Running time: 87 minutes
- Country: United States
- Language: English
- Budget: $6 million (estimated)
- Box office: $12.9 million (domestic)

Man's Best Friend is a 1993 American science fiction horror comedy film, directed and written by John Lafia. It stars Ally Sheedy, Lance Henriksen, Robert Costanzo, Frederic Lehne, John Cassini, and J. D. Daniels.

It was released by New Line Cinema on November 19, 1993. The film was a modest success at the box office, grossing $12.9 million behind a $6 million budget.

In the film, a television personality frees a Tibetan Mastiff from a genetic research facility, and proceeds to adopt him as a pet. She fails to realize that her dog is a product of genetic engineering, with enhanced strength, speed, and senses. She also fails to realize that her dog has rage-fueled outbursts of sadistic violence.

== Plot ==
Judy Sanders, an employee of a genetic research facility named EMAX contacts television personality and animal activist Lori Tanner. She is planning to meet after work so she can show Lori the atrocities and animal cruelty that go on in EMAX's laboratories. As she returns to work, an animal assailant attacks and kills her before being sedated by EMAX owner Robert Jarret, a scientist performing vivisection and genetic engineering. Later, Lori arrives at EMAX with her camerawoman Annie. They break into the laboratory, film the various animals that are being experimented on and free a Tibetan Mastiff named Max before escaping with him. Jarret immediately goes to the police and reports that his dog has been stolen. Later that night, a mugger steals Lori's purse. Max chases the thief, brutally kills him and retrieves the purse.

Unaware that Max killed the mugger, Lori develops a bond with him much to the disapproval of her boyfriend Perry. He insists Max must stay in the backyard. However, Max can understand human conversations and becomes protective of Lori. Jarret is questioned by the police about Max and reveals that Max is a genetically altered dog, spliced with the DNA of various other animals such as big cats, snakes, chameleons, and birds of prey, giving him enhanced strength, speed, and senses. Max is also prone to violent rages, and Jarret regularly gives him a drug to keep him relaxed, but he fears that the effects of the drug will soon wear off.

Max acts loyal, obedient, and lovable to Lori, but he wreaks havoc in the neighborhood when she is not around. Max scares a paperboy, devours a cat and a vulgar parakeet, chews through the brake lines in Perry's car, and kills a mailman. In addition, Max rapes Heidi, a young collie that belongs to Lori's young neighbor, Rudy.

Noticing Perry's animosity towards their new dog, Lori decides to find Max a new home. She takes him to a junkyard and leaves him with the owner Ray, who assures her that Max will be taken to a ranch in a few days. However, when Lori leaves, Ray chains Max to the wall and beats him with a shovel to end his barking. When Max pulls loose from his chain, Ray burns his face with a blow torch but is quickly overpowered and killed. Max, now scarred, makes his way back to Lori's house. The police, after discovering the dead mugger and having Jarret confirm that Max was the culprit, now intend to stop Max at any cost. By the time Max returns to Lori's house, Perry has replaced him with a new puppy named Spike. Max, feeling betrayed, burns Perry's face with his acidic urine, and attacks Lori before the police arrive, forcing Max to flee.

An ambulance takes Perry away, and the police demand Lori's help to catch Max. Later that night, Max returns and kills the officers watching the house. In an attempt to get him back, Jarret kidnaps Lori and Spike in hopes that Max will follow them to the EMAX building which he does. She first discovers him in the laboratory. Max relinquishes his aggressive, homicidal nature and begins to kiss Lori's hand. Jarret shoots Max with a shotgun before being knocked onto a large electrical cage, which kills him. Lori pets Max's head as he dies.

Three months later, Rudy's collie has given birth to puppies, most of which look like their mother, with the exception of a black puppy that resembles Max.

== Cast ==
- Ally Sheedy as Lori Tanner, a TV personality who becomes Max's adoptive owner.
- Lance Henriksen as Dr. Robert Jarret, a Mad scientist at EMAX who is Max's original owner and arch-nemesis.
- Robert Costanzo as Detective Frankie Kovacs, who investigates Max.
- Fredric Lehne as Perry, Lori's boyfriend and Max's arch-rival.
- John Cassini as Detective Emilio Bendetti, who investigates Max
- J. D. Daniels as Rudy, Lori's young next-door neighbor.
- William Sanderson as Ray, a junkyard owner.
- Trula M. Marcus as Annie, a camerawoman who works with Lori.
- Robin Frates as Judy Sanders, an employee at EMAX who is killed by Max.
- Bradley Pierce as Chet, Rudy's best friend.
- Rick Barker as Mailman
- Thomas Rosales, Jr. as Mugger, a man who robs Lori.
- Mickey Cassidy as Paperboy
- Cameron Arnett as Dog Catcher #1
- Adam Carl as Dog Catcher #2
- Frank Welker as Max 3000

== Release ==
Man's Best Friend was released in 1220 theaters on the Thanksgiving weekend of November 19, 1993. It opened at fifth place in the box office with $5 million.

=== Reception ===
Man's Best Friend currently has a 21% approval rating on Rotten Tomatoes, based on 14 reviews. Kevin Thomas of Los Angeles Times, noted that while "cynical and shallow", the film was "polished in all aspects". Despite this, Ally Sheedy was nominated for a Saturn Award for Best Actress. Film critic Leonard Maltin gave it a moderately positive two-and-a-half-star review, calling it "derivative, but fun."
