= John Lafia =

American film director and writer (1957–2020)

- Born: April 2, 1957; New York City, U.S.
- Died: April 29, 2020 (aged 63); Los Angeles, California, U.S.
- Education: University of California, Los Angeles
- Occupations: Film director; screenwriter
- Years active: 1983–2014
- Known for: Co-writer of Child's Play; Director of Child's Play 2

John Lafia (April 2, 1957 – April 29, 2020) was an American film director and screenwriter. He was best known for co-writing the slasher film Child's Play (1988) with Don Mancini and Tom Holland. He also directed the first sequel in the franchise, Child's Play 2.

== Career ==
Lafia's first feature film was The Blue Iguana, which he wrote and directed as well as producing the soundtrack. It was selected to screen at a special midnight showing in the Palais des Festivals at the 1988 Cannes Film Festival. Lafia co-wrote the screenplay for Child's Play (1988). As a credited screenwriter, he was responsible for coining the name "Chucky" and contributing trademark dialog such as "Hi, I'm Chucky, wanna play?" Upon its release, Child's Play was number one at the North American box office. The film won a Saturn Award for Best Horror Film, as well as a nomination for best writing. The film was also an Official Selection at the Festival International du Film Fantastique d'Avoriaz. Lafia went on to direct Child's Play 2 (1990). The film debuted at number one on the North American box office charts. It was nominated for a Saturn Award, and was an Official Selection at the Festival International du Film Fantastique d'Avoriaz. Lafia followed Child's Play 2 with Man's Best Friend (1993), which he both wrote and directed for New Line Cinema. The film debuted at number two on the North American box office charts and was selected for the Special Prize at the Festival international du film fantastique de Gérardmer by a panel of judges led by Terry Gilliam and Walter Hill. Man's Best Friend also garnered a Saturn Award nomination in the science fiction category. The film was an Official Selection at the Brussels International Fantastic Film Festival, as well as the Beauvais Film Festival Cinemalia.

In the mid-1990s, Lafia became an early pioneer of new media. He directed the live-action video game Corpse Killer (1994) for Digital Pictures/Sega, and an interactive featurette, Bombmeister (1995), for Sony/Interfilm. Both works married computer technology with live-action imagery and digital graphics to present the audience with an interactive world that was just beginning to emerge. Lafia also became active in episodic and long-form television, directing multiple episodes of Babylon 5 and TV movies: The Rats, Chameleon 3: Dark Angel, Monster, Firestorm: Last Stand at Yellowstone and Code 1114 for Paramount, Fox, A&E and CBS. This culminated in the NBC miniseries 10.5 (2004) and its sequel 10.5: Apocalypse (2006), which Lafia wrote, directed and produced. Upon its release, 10.5 became the highest-rated miniseries of the year, drawing viewers of twenty million for two nights, and is among the top five miniseries of the decade.

Prior to his career as a filmmaker, Lafia was involved in the underground Los Angeles music scene. Going by the name John J. Lafia, his early work Prayers (1984) was released on the cassette-only label Tranceport Tapes, featuring an album cover by Lane Smith and original artwork by Lafia. This was followed by tracks on LA Mantra Two (1984) and Phantom Cuts (1985). Lafia was also featured on the spoken word anthology English as a Second Language (1983) alongside Los Angeles poets Charles Bukowski, Wanda Coleman and Exene Cervenka. He has a track on the German compilation Voices from North America (1994), recorded with producer/musician Ethan James. In 2008, Lafia began to focus on composing and recording once again. He created the short rock opera The Ballad of Frank and Cora (2013), for which he wrote the music and performed vocals for the title role. In 2019, a limited edition double LP of John's music was issued by Discos Transgenero and released by Aguirre Records. This compilation, John Lafia 1980–1985, was released digitally shortly thereafter. He was preparing more releases covering the same time period and continuing to record new material in his studio in the Los Angeles area of Silver Lake, California.

== Death ==
John Lafia died by hanging himself on April 29, 2020. He is survived by his children and former wife.

== Filmography ==
=== Theatrical films ===
| Year | Title | Director | Writer | Other | Notes |
|---|---|---|---|---|---|
| 1983 | Space Raiders | | | Yes | Set dresser |
| 1984 | Repo Man | | | Yes | Leadman |
| 1988 | The Blue Iguana | Yes | Yes | Yes | Executive music producer |
| 1988 | Child's Play | | Yes | | |
| 1990 | Child's Play 2 | Yes | | | |
| 1993 | Man's Best Friend | Yes | Yes | | |
| 1995 | Bombmeister | Yes | | | |

=== Television ===
TV series

| Year(s) | Title | Director | Writer | Producer | Notes |
|---|---|---|---|---|---|
| 1988-1989 | Freddy's Nightmares | Yes | | | 2 episodes |
| 1991 | Dark Justice | Yes | | | 2 episodes |
| 1996 | The Adventures of Sinbad | | Yes | | Episode "Still Life" |
| 1997 | Babylon 5 | Yes | | | 3 episodes |
| 1998 | Ghost Stories | | Yes | | Episode "Underground" |
| 2002 | The Dead Zone | Yes | | | Episode "Quality of Life" |
| 2004 | 10.5 | Yes | Yes | | 2 episodes / cameo as "Irate Man" |
| 2006 | 10.5: Apocalypse | Yes | Yes | Co-Executive | 2 episodes / performing song "Understanding" |
| 2014 | Jack's Jacuze | | | Associate | 4 episodes |

TV movies

| Year | Title | Director | Writer | Producer | Notes |
|---|---|---|---|---|---|
| 1999 | Monster | Yes | | | |
| 2000 | Chameleon 3: Dark Angel | Yes | | | |
| 2002 | The Rats | Yes | | | |
| 2003 | Code 11-14 | | Story | Executive | |
| 2006 | Firestorm: Last Stand at Yellowstone | Yes | | | Cameo as "Irate Man #2" |

=== Video game ===
- Corpse Killer (1995)

== Discography ==
- English as a Second Language: Odyssey Girls (1983) – composer, producer
- Prayers (1984) – composer, performer
- LA Mantra 2: Queen of the Nile (1984) – composer, performer
- Phantom Takes: The Moth (1985) – composer, performer
- Voices from North America: The Confession (1986) – composer, performer
- John Lafia 1980–1985 (2019) – composer, performer
