= Ulrich L. Lehner =

German philosopher, theologian and historian

Ulrich L. Lehner (born 1976 in Straubing, Bavaria, Germany) is the Warren Foundation Professor of Theology at the University of Notre Dame. He is a trained theologian and historian.

== Life and education ==
After graduating from the Johannes-Turmair-Gymnasium in Straubing in 1996, he received a B.A. in philosophy from the Munich School of Philosophy and a B.A. in theology from LMU Munich in 1999, and a diploma in theology from LMU Munich in 2003. In 2006, he received his PhD in theology from the University of Regensburg with a thesis on the concept of providence of Immanuel Kant and Protestant scholasticism. In 2015, he received the degree of habilitated doctor in history from the Central European University with his award-winning book Enlightened Monks; it was the first ever degree of its kind awarded at the CEU.

== Career ==
From 2006 to 2019 Lehner was professor of historical theology and religious history at Marquette University in Milwaukee.

In 2013, he declined a job offer for a professorship in German Literature at the University of Kansas and in 2019 for the Warren Chair at Duke Divinity School. Since July 2019, he is the William K. Warren Foundation professor of theology at the University of Notre Dame.

== Research Focus ==
The bulk of his research is focused on the religious and cultural history spanning from the Renaissance era to the current times. His groundbreaking research on the Catholic Enlightenment has received international acclaim and established him as a leading authority on the subject. In 2022 his book The Inner Life of Catholic Reform proposed an integrative approach to consider spiritual factors in the study of the Counter-Reformation and Catholic Reform. Historian Carlos Eire praised this book as "a brilliant interweaving of cultural, intellectual, and social history reminiscent of the best histoire total produced by the Annales school." In recent years, Lehner has shifted his focus to historical studies on race and religion, particular the history of his own ethnic heritage, the Romani, and the history of sexuality.

Since 2013, he has penned several studies on clergy crimes, uncovering century old patterns of secrecy and deception about violent and sexual abuse. In 2023 he published a monograph on sexual crimes in the pre-1773 Society of Jesus, entitled Staged Chastity, which has also attracted international attention. His biography of Rudolf von Gerlach, which was praised for its gripping narrative style and detailed analysis, appeared in 2025.

Lehner has contributed in a variety of publications to the history of academic freedom, the history of gender and sexuality, the history of sexual abuse in the Catholic Church, and the relationship between Catholic thinkers and German Nazi ideology. Recently, he has been advocating for the usefulness of Nicolai Hartmann's ontology in the field of history. In 2023 he suggested a "synodal hermeneutic" for historical theology, demonstrating support for the reform agenda of Pope Francis' Synod on Synodality.

Lehner's publications have been translated into seven foreign languages.

== Honors ==
Since 2014, Lehner is a member of the European Academy of Sciences and Arts, since 2018 of the Accademia Ambrosiana, and since 2022 of the Academia Europea.

Lehner was a member and Herodotus Fellow of the Institute for Advanced Study in Princeton, twice a Distinguished Fellow at the Notre Dame Institute for Advanced Study, twice a research fellow of the Earhart Foundation, a senior fellow of the Alexander von Humboldt Foundation as well as the Carl Friedrich von Siemens Foundation, visiting professor at the Catholic University of Eichstätt-Ingolstadt, the University of Hamburg and the University of Pennsylvania. In 2025 Lehner received a fellowship from the National Endowment for the Humanities, which was rescinded briefly afterwards due to the DOGE budget cuts.

== Publications (selected) ==
=== As sole author ===
- Historia Magistra. Zur Archivgeschichte des altbayerischen Kollegiatstiftes SS. Jakobus und Tiburtius in Straubing. Nordhausen 2003, ISBN 3-88309-118-9.
- Kants Vorsehungskonzept auf dem Hintergrund der deutschen Schulphilosophie und -theologie. Leiden and Boston: Brill, 2007, ISBN 90-04-15607-0.
- Enlightened Monks. The German Benedictines 1740–1803. Oxford: Oxford University Press 2011, ISBN 0-19-959512-7.
- Monastic Prisons and Torture Chambers. Crime and Punishment in Central European Monasteries, 1600–1800. Eugene: Wipf and Stock, 2013, ISBN 978-1-62564-040-6.
- Mönche und Nonnen im Klosterkerker. Ein verdrängtes Kapitel Kirchengeschichte. Kevelaer: ToposPlus 2015, ISBN 978-3-8367-1004-6. Completely rewritten and enlarged German edition of Monastic Prisons.
- On the Road to Vatican II. German Catholic Enlightenment and Reform of the Church. Augsburg: Fortress Press, 2016, ISBN 978-1-5064-0898-9
- The Catholic Enlightenment. The Forgotten History of a Global Movement. Oxford/New York: Oxford University Press 2016, ISBN 978-0-19-091228-4.
  - Die katholische Aufklärung. Weltgeschichte einer Reformbewegung. Paderborn 2017, ISBN 3-506-78695-4. German translation.
  - Katalikų Apšvieta. Pamiršta pasaulinio judėjimo istorija. Vox Altera, Vilnius 2018, ISBN 978-609-8088-28-1. Lithuanian translation.
  - Illuminismo cattolico. La storia dimenticata di un movimento globale. Milan, Edizione studium, 2022. ISBN 978-8838251306. Italian translation.
- God is not nice. Ave Maria Press, 2017, ISBN 978-1-59471-748-2.
  - Dios no Mola. Homo Legens, 2019, ISBN 978-84-17407-58-2. Spanish translation.
  - Gott ist unbequem. Herder Verlag, 2019. ISBN 978-3-451-03165-6. German translation.
  - Bóg nie jest miły. Pułapka pluszowego chrześcijaństwa. W Drodze, 2020 ISBN 978-83-7906-308-6. Polish translation.
  - Deus não é avô. Laisnova – Edição e Formação: Artis, 2020. ISBN 978-972-9111-45-7. Portuguese translation.
  - Dieu n'est pas un chic type. Artège: 2022. ISBN 979-1033612100. French translation.
- Think Better. Unlocking the Power of Reason. Baker Academic Press 2021. ISBN 978-1540964779.
- The Inner Life of Catholic Reform. From the Council of Trent to the Enlightenment. Oxford/New York: Oxford University Press, 2022. ISBN 978-0197620601.
  - La vida interior en la Reforma católica. Del Concilio de Trento a la Ilustración. Navarra: Ediciones Universidad de Navarra, 2025. ISBN 978-84-313-4063-6. Spanish translation.
- Inszenierte Keuschheit: Sexualdelikte in der Gesellschaft Jesu im 17. und 18. Jahrhundert. De Gruyter, 2023. ISBN 978-3-11-131114-2
  - Staged Chastity. Sexual Transgressions of Early Modern Jesuits. Oxford, New York: Oxford University Press, 2026, forthcoming. [completely rewritten and enlarged version]
- Spion für Papst, Kaiser und British Empire: Das geheimnisvolle Leben des Rudolf von Gerlach. Herder, 2025. ISBN 978-3451399589

=== As sole editor ===
- Martin Knutzen – Beweis von der Wahrheit der christlichen Religion (1747). Bautz 2006, ISBN 978-3-88309-335-2.
- Johann Poiger – Theologie ohne Hexen und Zauberer (1780). Religionsgeschichte der Frühen Neuzeit Bd. 4. Bautz. 2006. ISBN 978-3-88309-368-0.
- Religion nach Kant. Texte aus dem Werk des Kantianers Johann Heinrich Tieftrunk. Religionsgeschichte der Frühen Neuzeit Bd. 3. Bautz, 2007. ISBN 978-3-88309-394-9.
- Die scholastische Theologie im Zeitalter der Gnadenstreitigkeiten I: Neue Texte von Diego Paez (†1582), Diego del Mármol (†1664) und Gregor von Valencia (†1603). Religionsgeschichte der Frühen Neuzeit Bd. 2. Bautz, 2007. ISBN 978-3-88309-365-9
- Johann Nikolaus von Hontheim: Justinus Febronius – De Statu Ecclesiae. Abbreviatus et Emendatus (1777). Religionsgeschichte der frühen Neuzeit Bd. 5. Bautz, 2008. ISBN 978-3-88309-445-8
- Johann Nikolaus von Hontheim: Justinus Febronius – Commentarius in Suam Retractationem. Religionsgeschichte der frühen Neuzeit Bd. 6. Bautz, 2008. ISBN 978-3-88309-446-5
- Beda Mayr – Vertheidigung der katholischen Religion (1789). Brill, 2009, ISBN 978-90-04-17318-7.
- Klostergericht und -kerker. Der "Criminalprocess der Franciscaner" (1769). Religionsgeschichte der frühen Neuzeit Bd. 14. Nordhausen: Bautz, 2012. ISBN 978-3-88309-786-2
- Paul Simon—The Human Element in the Church of Christ (1936). With an Introduction by Ulrich L. Lehner. Eugene, OR: Wipf and Stock, 2016. ISBN 978-1-4982-9309-9.
- Otto Michael Knab's Fox Fables. Wipf and Stock, 2017, ISBN 978-1-5326-3293-8.
- Women, Enlightenment and Catholicism. Routledge, 2017, ISBN 978-1-138-68763-9.
- Innovation in Early Modern Catholicism. London and New York: Routledge, 2022. ISBN 978-1-032-05197-0
- Beda Mayr: A Defence of the Catholic Religion. The Existence, Necessity, and Limits of the Infallible Church. Translated and introduced by U.L. Washington, DC: Catholic University of America Press, 2023, ISBN 978-0-8132-3773-2
- Ludovico Muratori: On the Moderation of Reason in Religious Matters. Translated by U.L. Washington, DC: Catholic University of America Press, 2024, ISBN 978-0-8132-3844-9

=== As coeditor ===
- with R. Tacelli: Giovanni Sala – Kontroverse Theologie. Nova et Vetera, 2005.
- with R. Tacelli: Giovanni Sala – Kant, Lonergan und der christliche Glaube. Bautz, 2005, ISBN 978-3-88309-236-2.
- with Michael Printy: Brills Companion to the Catholic Enlightenment. Brill, 2010, ISBN 978-90-04-18351-3.
- with Jeff Burson: Enlightenment and Catholicism in Europe. University of Notre Dame Press, 2014. ISBN 978-0-268-02240-2.
- with G. Roeber, R. Muller: Oxford Handbook of Early Modern Theology, 1500–1800. Oxford/New York: Oxford University Press, 2016, ISBN 978-0-19-993794-3. Paperback: 2018.
- with R. Tacelli u. a.: Wort und Wahrheit. Fragen der Erkenntnistheorie. Festschrift f. Harald Schöndorf. Kohlhammer Verlag, Stuttgart 2019, ISBN 978-3-17-034986-5.
- Catholic Enlightenment. A Global Anthology. Edited with Shaun Blanchard. Washington: Catholic University of America Press, 2021. ISBN 978-0-8132-3398-7

=== As series editor ===
- Early Modern Catholic Sources. Catholic University of America Press
- Religionsgeschichte der Frühen Neuzeit. Bautz Verlag.
- Catholicisms, 1450–1800. Boydell and Brewer-Durham University Press, UK
- Modern Catholic History, edited with Carolina Armenteros, Brill Publishing.
