= Beda Mayr =

Bavarian Benedictine philosopher, apologist, and poet

Beda Mayr (15 January 1742 – 28 April 1794) was a Bavarian Benedictine philosopher, apologist, and poet.

He was the author of A Defense of the Catholic Religion, which was placed on the Index Librorum Prohibitorum

== Works ==
- A Defence of the Catholic Religion. The Existence, Necessity, and Limits of the Infallible Church. Translated and introduced by Ulrich L. Lehner Washington, DC: Catholic University of America Press, 2023, ISBN 978-0-8132-3773-2
