= 10.5 (miniseries) =

2004 television miniseries directed by John Lafia

- 10.5 Poster
- Written by: Christopher Canaan; John Lafia; Ronnie Christensen
- Directed by: John Lafia
- Starring: Kim Delaney; Beau Bridges; John Schneider; Dulé Hill; Fred Ward; David Cubitt; Kaley Cuoco; Iris Graham
- Theme music composer: Lee Holdridge
- Country of origin: United States
- Original language: English

Production
- Producers: Gary Pearl; Lisa Richardson
- Cinematography: David Foreman
- Editors: Don Brochu; Michael N. Knue
- Running time: 165 minutes

Original release
- Network: NBC
- Release: May 2 – May 3, 2004

Related
- 10.5: Apocalypse

10.5 is a 2004 American disaster film directed by John Lafia which aired as a television miniseries in the United States from May 2 to May 3, 2004 on NBC. The plot focuses on a series of catastrophic earthquakes along the United States west coast, culminating in one measuring 10.5 on the Richter scale.

10.5 was widely ridiculed by both reviewers and geologists; nevertheless, it received respectable Nielsen ratings.

The first part of the miniseries aired on May 2, 2004, and the second one aired on May 3. A sequel, 10.5: Apocalypse, was aired on May 21, 2006, and May 23, 2006.

== Plot ==
=== Part 1 ===
The film begins in the Seattle, Washington, area with increasingly severe earthquake activity. A quake of magnitude 7.9 is measured at the Earthquake centre, where Dr. Samantha Hill takes command, displacing Dr. Jordan Fisher. U.S. president Paul Hollister and FEMA director Roy Nolan are informed about the situation.

A magnitude 8.4 earthquake opens a crack which engulfs an entire Amtrak train in the east of Redding, California. As a result, Governor Carla Williams, who has just seen her daughter and ex-husband off on a camping trip, agrees to help the Governor of Washington. Amanda Williams and her father Clark Williams arrive at a town named Browning, where everything is covered in a thick red haze. They discover a car with a dead family inside, and are nearly trapped in quicksand.

Roy Nolan constructs a task force of the best geologists and seismologists, including Dr. Fisher and Dr. Hill. Dr. Hill mentions her Hidden Fault theory and is eventually given permission to prove it. She and Dr. Fisher visit a lake, where they see some animals that died from carbon monoxide poisoning and are almost poisoned themselves.

Back at the Task Force Center, Dr. Hill predicts that the next quake will be near San Francisco, California. It is deemed too risky to evacuate the entirety of San Francisco, which is eventually devastated by a 9.2 magnitude earthquake. After that, Dr. Hill predicts the next quake will happen at the San Andreas fault, which would wipe out the West Coast in its present shape killing 50 million people on the way. Dr. Hill hypothesizes that they could "weld" the fault shut by letting it experience immense heat, which could only be created with nuclear bombs.

=== Part 2 ===
The President, after some deliberation, follows Nolan's advice to execute Dr. Hill's plan and allows the placement of the nuclear warheads. Additionally, he gives the order to evacuate the entire West Coast in case it fails and mobilizes all resources available for it.

Five of the six nuclear bombs have been successfully installed, but during the installation of the sixth, an earthquake occurs, and a warhead is lost. Nolan tries to set it manually, but is pinned by the warhead.

The Williams find a truck carrying survivors, and they are transported to Tent City, which has been set up for the refugees. In a wounded San Francisco, Carla Williams and her assistant Rachel are trapped under a wall. Carla survives, but Rachel is killed.

Deciding that nothing can be done about the lost sixth warhead, Dr. Hill decides to continue with the fault welding plan and detonate the first five. The sixth is activated by Nolan who manages to reach the control panel just in time, but is himself vaporized.

It seems to work, until Dr. Hill, concerned about southern California, observes a river flowing backwards, draining into the open fault. The last warhead was not deep enough when it exploded and Southern California is still in danger. Shortly after, a massive earthquake occurs. Eventually, the crack reaches Tent City and peaks at 10.5. When the earthquake stops, the survivors see that the southwestern coast of California has been cut away, forming a new island.

== Cast ==
- Kim Delaney as Dr. Samantha "Sam" Hill
- Beau Bridges as President Paul Hollister
- Fred Ward as Roy Nolan, FEMA Director
- Brian Markinson as Daniel, President Hollister's advisor
- John Schneider as Clark Williams
- Kaley Cuoco as Amanda Williams
- Dulé Hill as Dr. Owen Hunter
- Ivan Sergei as Dr. Zach Nolan
- David Cubitt as Dr. Jordan Fisher
- Iris Graham as Zoe Cameron
- John Cassini as Sean Morris, President Hollister's aide
- Rebecca Jenkins as California Governor Carla Williams
- Kimberly Hawthorne as Jill Hunter
- Erin Karpluk as Rachel, Governor Williams's assistant

== Reception ==
The film was nominated for a 2004 Emmy Award in the category of "Outstanding Special Visual Effects for a Miniseries, Movie or a Special" and a 2005 NAACP Image Award for "Outstanding Actor in a Television Movie, Mini-Series or Dramatic Special". It was awarded the "Award of Distinction" from the Australian Cinematographers Society in the category of "Telefeatures, TV Drama & Mini Series".

In response to the airing of 10.5, the Southern California Earthquake Center added a section to their website about the science depicted in the film. Referring to it as "a miniseries with major errors", the site lists various events that occur during the film and explains why they are incorrect.
