= Passerini =

Passerini is a surname. Notable people with the surname include:

- Carlo Passerini (1793–1857), Italian entomologist
- Giovanni Passerini (1816–1893), Italian botanist and entomologist
- Ilario Passerini (born 1952), Italian sprint canoer
- Katia Passerini, Italian academic administrator
- Lorenzo Passerini (born 1991), Italian conductor
- Silvio Passerini (1469–1529), Italian cardinal, the "Cardinal of Cortona"

== See also ==
- Passerini's tanager
- Passerini reaction
- Carlo Gambacorti-Passerini
- Elachista passerini
- Terranova dei Passerini
