= Concina =

Concina is a surname. Notable people with the surname include:

- Barbie Concina (born 1998), Filipina actress
- Daniello Concina (1687–1756), Italian Dominican preacher, controversialist and theologian
- Enzo Concina (born 1962), Canadian soccer player
- Roberto Concina (1969–2017), Swiss-born Italian record producer, composer, musician and DJ known as Robert Miles
