= Hieronymus Medices =

Itialian philosopher

Hieronymus Medices (or De Medicis), was a Roman Catholic philosopher and interpreter of the works of Thomas Aquinas; b. 1569 in Camerino, Umbria, the origin of his surname de Medicis a Camerino.

== Biography ==
He was clothed with the Dominican habit at Ancona. He first distinguished himself as professor of philosophy and theology in various houses of the Province of Lombardy, whence he was advanced to a professorship in the more important theological school at Bologna. He was approved by the general chapter of his Order held in Paris, 1611, and raised to the mastership and doctorate. He was then performing the duties of general censor for the tribunal of the Inquisition established at Mantua, for which reason he is said eventually to have secured the transfer of his affiliation to the convent of that place (1618). His career ended in 1622.

== Works ==
His career was marked by a studious application to the doctrines of Aquinas. Just as the Paris chapter was acknowledging his intellectual ability, he completed the first part of his Summae theologiae S. Thomae Aquinatis doctoris angelici formalis explicatio. In this work he puts into syllogistic form the whole Summa Theologica, aimed primarily at the enlightenment of beginners. The first part was not published until the first section of the second part was ready (Venice), 1614. Three years later followed the second section, but it was not until 1622 that the third part appeared at Salo, instead of Venice. The supplement had preceded the third part by a year (Venice, 1621); it was not published at Mantels in 1623. Other more correct editions have followed even as late as (Casa Vici, Italy) 1858-1862.

Jacobus Quétif improved the original in accuracy. He reproduced the work in five tomes, folio (Paris), in 1657. Some have found that the arrangement of Aquinas in syllogistic form allows a quickness of grasp with an easiness of assimilation not otherwise obtainable. In the Vici edition certain additions have been made which are outside the scope of the original. They serve as appendices to each question and, under the caption Utilitas pro Ecclesia S. Dei, furnish the student with practical applications of the original matter in view of dogmas subsequently developed.
