= Peter of Bergamo =

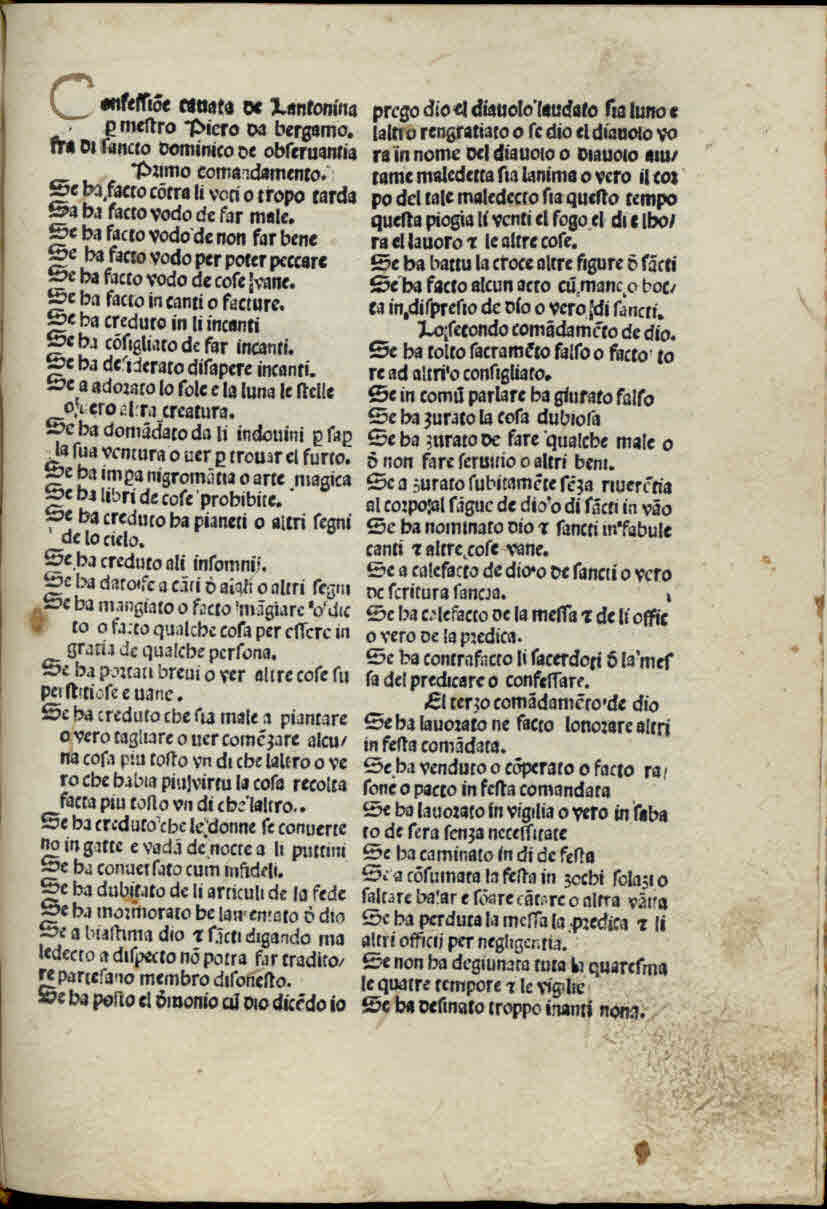
Confessione cavata dall'Antonina, 1487-1490

Peter of Bergamo also called Peter of Almadura (1400 ca. - 1482) was an Italian Dominican theologian.

== Life ==
Born in Bergamo in the early 15th century, he entered the Dominican Order in his native town, and completed his studies at the University of Bologna, where he received his degree. In the Dominican House of Studies he filled the offices of Master of Students and Bachelor of the Studium.

He died in Piacenza in 1482. The people of Piacenza venerated him as a saint, and Leandro Alberti states that miracles were wrought through his intercession. His remains were deposited in a crypt under the high altar of the chapel of St. Thomas.

== Works ==
All of his surviving writings deal with the works of Thomas Aquinas: "Index universalis in omnia opera D. Th. de Aquino" (Bologna, 1475) and "Concordantiæ locorum doct. Angel. quæ sibi invicem adversari videntur" (Basle, 1478), combined under the title, "Tabula in libros . . . cum additionibus conclusionum, concordantiis locorum et S. Script. auctoritatibus" (Venice, 1497; Rome, 1535).

In the edition of St. Thomas's works published by order of Pius V all Almadura's indices, etc. appear under the name: "Tabula aurea exim. doct. Fr. Petri de Bergamo . . . in omnes libros, opuscula et commentaria D. Th. Aquin. . . ." (Rome, 1570). This "Tabula aurea" was republished as vol. XXV of the Parma edition of St. Thomas's works (Parma, 1873).
