= Vicente Ferre =

Spanish Dominican theologian

Vicente Ferre (b. at Valencia, Spain; d. at Salamanca in 1682) was a Spanish Dominican theologian, a leading Thomist of his time.

== Life ==
He entered the Dominican Order at Salamanca, where he pursued his studies in the Dominican College of St. Stephen. After teaching in several houses of study of his order in Spain, he was called from Burgos to Rome, where for eighteen years he was regens primarius of the Dominican College of St. Thomas, the future Pontifical University of Saint Thomas Aquinas, Angelicum.

From Rome he went to Salamanca, where he became prior of the convent and, after three years, regent of studies.

== Works ==
Ferre died while publishing his commentaries on the Summa Theologica of Thomas Aquinas. These include the following folio volumes:

- two on the Secunda Secundae, covering the treatises of faith, hope, and charity, and the opposite vices (Rome, 1669)
- three on the Prima (Salamanca, 1675, 1676, and 1678 respectively)
- three on the Prima Secundae, down to Q. cxiii, (Salamanca, 1679, 1681, and 1690 respectively)

His confrère Pérez à Lerma added to Q. cxiv the treatise on merit.
