= Jean Nicolaï =

French Dominican theologian (1594–1673)

Jean Nicolaï (1594 at Mouzay in the Diocese of Verdun, France – 7 May 1673 at Paris) was a French Dominican theologian and controversialist.

== Life ==
Entering the order at the age of twelve, he made his religious profession in 1612, studied philosophy and theology in the convent of St. James at Paris. and in 1632 obtained his doctorate in theology at the Sorbonne. Nicolaï taught in various houses of the Dominican order, and became the regent of the Paris Dominicans. Besides Latin and Greek he was conversant with Italian, Spanish, and Hebrew.

He was a member of the commission appointed to examine the works and teachings of the Jansenists and to prevent the further dissemination of their doctrine in the Sorbonne. In the disputes on grace between the Thomists and Molinists, which the teaching of Jansenius revived, he adhered strictly to the Thomistic doctrine.

He was esteemed at the royal court and received a pension of 600 francs. He was buried in the chapel of the convent of St. James in Paris, and a marble stone beside the grave bears a long inscription recounting his virtues, his learning, and his services to his country.

== Works ==
His numerous works fall into three classes.

=== Editor ===
Nicolaï edited a number of works by older theologians, adding commentaries and explanatory notes. These included:

- Raineri de Pisis [1351] ord. Fr. Praed. Pantheologia sive universa theologia ordine alphabetico per varios titulos distributa (Lyons, 1670): to each of the three volumes of this work he added a dissertation against the Jansenists
- S. Thomae Aq. Expositio continua super quatuor evangelistas (Lyons, 1670)
- S. Thomae Aq. commentaria in quatuor libros sententiarum P. Lombardi (Lyons, 1659)
- Commentarius posterior super libros sententiarum (Lyons, 1660)
- S. Thomae Aq. quaestiones quodlibetales (Lyons, 1660)
- S. Thomae Aq. Summa theologica innumeris Patrum, Conciliorum, scripturarum ac decretorum testimoniis ad materias controversas vel ad moralem disciplinam pertinentibus. . . illustrata (Lyons, 1663)
- S. Thomae Aq. explanatio in omnes d. Pauli Ap. epistolas commentaria (Lyons, 1689)

=== Theological ===
Nicolaï also wrote a number of original theological works. These included:

- Judicium seu censorium suffragium de propositione Ant. Arnaldi sorbonici doctoris et socii ad quaestionem juris pertinente (Paris, 1656)
- Theses theologicae de gratia seu theses molinisticae thomisticis notis expunctae (Paris, 1656)
- Apologia naturae et gratiae (Bordeaux, 1665)

Against Launoy, the champion of the "Gallican Liberties", he wrote:

- De jejunii christiani et christianiae abstinentiae vero ac legitimo ritu (Paris, 1667)
- De Concilio plenario, quod contra Donatistas baptismi quaestionem ex Augustini sensu definivit (Paris, 1667)
- De plenarii Concilii et baptismatis hereticorum assertione dissertatio posterior anteriorem firmans (Paris, 1668)
- De baptismi antiquo usu ab Ecclesia instituto, dissertatio (Paris, 1668)
- De Constantini baptismo, ubi, quando et a quibus fuerit celebratus historica dissertatio (Paris, 1680)

=== Poetical and political ===
The purpose of Nicolaï's poetical and political writings seems to have been to extol the dignity and glory of France and her kings. He delivered in Rome in 1628 a panegyric in honour of the victory of Louis XIII at La Rochelle and in 1661 composed a poem in honour of the son of Louis XIV.
