= Noyelle =

Noyelle may refer to:

== Places ==
- Arboretum de Tigny-Noyelle, an arboretum located in Tigny-Noyelle
- Noyelle-Vion, a commune in the Pas-de-Calais department in the Hauts-de-France region of France.
- Tigny-Noyelle, a commune in the Pas-de-Calais department in the Hauts-de-France region of France.

== People ==
- André Noyelle (1931–2003), a road racing cyclist from Belgium.
- Charles de Noyelle (1615–1686), a Belgian Jesuit priest.
- Francis de Noyelle (1919–2017), French ambassador to Nepal between 1980 and 1984

== See also ==
- Noyelles (disambiguation)
