= Thyrsus González de Santalla =

Spanish Jesuit theologian (1624–1705)

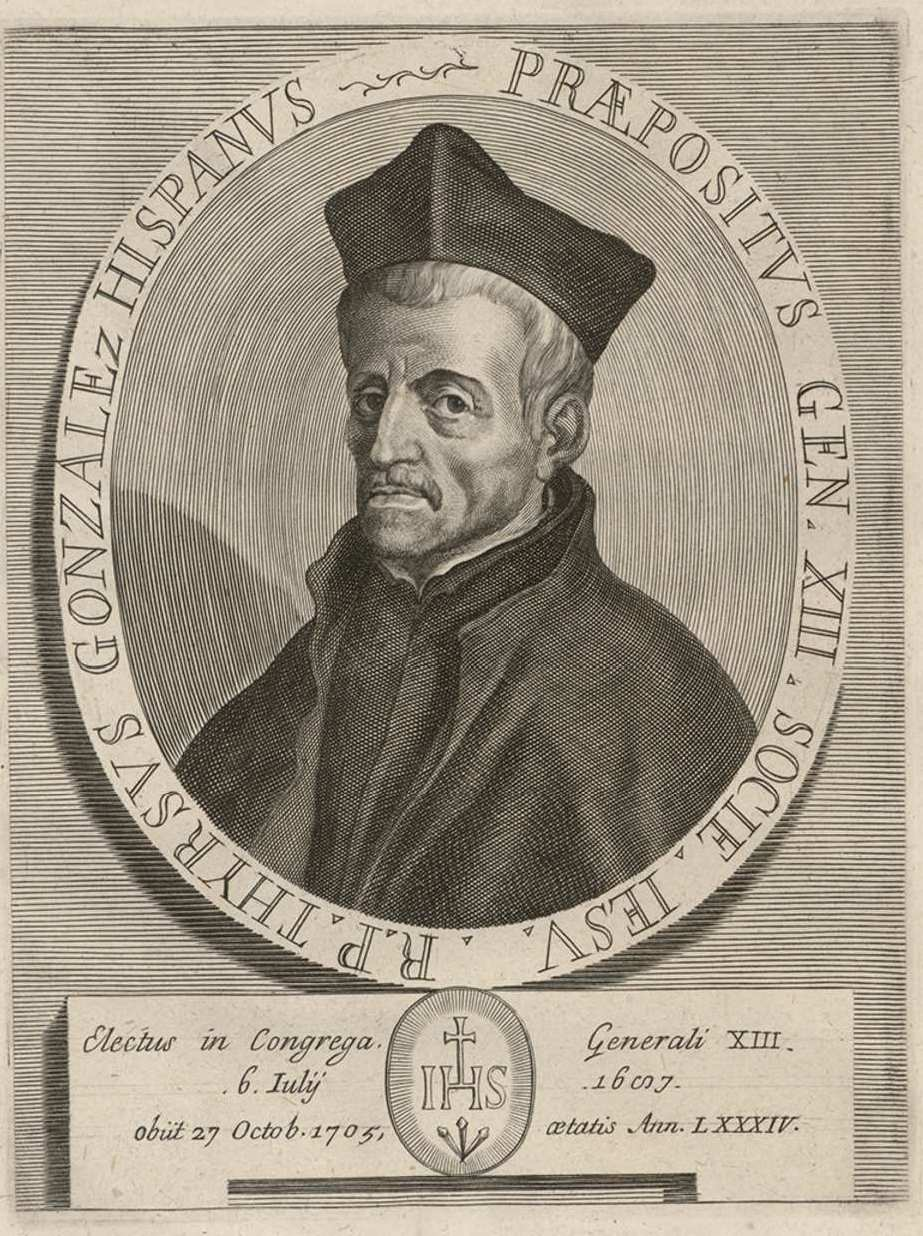
A portrait of Tirso González de Santalla

Tirso González de Santalla SJ (18 January 1624 – 27 October 1705) was a Spanish theologian who was elected, in 1687, the thirteenth Superior General of the Society of Jesus.

== Formation and Studies ==
Santalla was born in Arganza, Spain. He did his Humanities and Letters at Villafranca (Leόn), and a year of Philosophy at Oviedo before he entered the Society of Jesus in 1643. Studies of Philosophy at Valladolid (1645–47) and Theology at the University of Salamanca (1647–51) with a further two years of specialization. A brilliant debater he was trained to be professor of philosophy and theology, which he did at Santiago (Philosophy, 1653–55) and Valladolid and Salamanca (Theology, 1656–65), and again from 1676 to 1687, the intervening years having been devoted to preaching.

== Early career ==
As an ardent adversary of probabilism González had frequently asked his superiors to have some Jesuit write against the doctrine. He himself had composed a work in which he defended probabiliorism, assigning, however, an exaggerated importance to the subjective estimation of the degree of probability. The general revisors of the Society unanimously rendered an unfavorable opinion on the work, and accordingly, in 1674, the Superior General Giovanni Paolo Oliva refused permission for its publication. González received encouragement from Pope Innocent XI and by his order the Holy Office issued a decree, in 1680, ordering the superiors of the Society to allow their subjects to defend probabiliorism, a permission that had never been denied.

== Superior General ==
When about to set out for Africa to convert the Muslims in 1687, he was sent as an elector to the thirteenth general congregation, by which he was elected Superior General (6 July 1687). Concerned that most Jesuits were in favour of probabilism, the Pope made it clear that González, a rare probabiliorist in the Society, was his candidate. As General of the Society, González felt himself obliged to fight probabilism among his subjects. In 1691, he had printed a modified edition of his former work, but, owing to the efforts of his assistants, this book was never published. Pope Innocent XII ordered a new examination of it to be made, and with many corrections it finally appeared in 1694, under the title Fundamentum Theologiae moralis id est, tractatus theologicus de recto usu opinionum probabilium. He died, aged 81, in Rome.

== Works ==
González's apologetic Selectarum disputationum tomi quattuor (1680) contains chapters against the Thomists, Jansenists, and some doctors of Louvain; treatises on the Immaculate Conception, and on papal infallibility. This last, directed against the Declaration of the Clergy of France of 1682, and printed by the order of Innocent XI, was afterwards suppressed by Alexander VIII, who feared new difficulties with the French court. The work appeared, in résumé only, in 1691.

Catholic Church titles
Preceded by Charles de Noyelle	Superior General of the Society of Jesus; 1686 – 1705	Succeeded by Michelangelo Tamburini
