= Noyelles =

Noyelles may refer to:

== Communes in France ==
=== Nord ===
- Noyelles-lès-Seclin
- Noyelles-sur-Escaut
- Noyelles-sur-Sambre
- Noyelles-sur-Selle

=== Pas-de-Calais ===
- Noyelles-Godault
- Noyelles-lès-Humières
- Noyelles-lès-Vermelles
- Noyelles-sous-Bellonne
- Noyelles-sous-Lens

=== Somme ===
- Noyelles-en-Chaussée
- Noyelles-sur-Mer
- Pont-Noyelles

== People ==
- Jacques-Louis Comte de Noyelles (c. 1655–1708), Walloon military officer
- Jean IV de Noyelles (c. 1365–1415), French nobleman and knight
- Nicolas-Joseph de Noyelles de Fleurimont (1695–1761), officer in the colonial regular troops

== Transportation ==
- Noyelles-sur-Mer station, a railway station serving Noyelles-sur-Mer

== See also ==
- Noyelle (disambiguation)
