= The Mission (1986 film) =

1986 British film by Roland Joffé

- US theatrical release poster
- Directed by: Roland Joffé
- Written by: Robert Bolt
- Produced by: Fernando Ghia; David Puttnam
- Starring: Robert De Niro; Jeremy Irons
- Cinematography: Chris Menges
- Edited by: Jim Clark
- Music by: Ennio Morricone
- Production companies: Goldcrest Films; Kingsmere; Enigma Productions
- Distributed by: Warner Bros. (US, UK and Mexico); Goldcrest Films (overseas)
- Release dates: 16 May 1986 (Cannes); 29 September 1986 (Spain); 31 October 1986 (US)
- Running time: 125 minutes
- Country: United Kingdom
- Language: English
- Budget: £16.5 million
- Box office: $17.2 million

The Mission is a 1986 British historical drama film directed by Roland Joffé, from a screenplay by Robert Bolt. It stars Robert De Niro and Jeremy Irons, with Ray McAnally, Aidan Quinn, Cherie Lunghi and Liam Neeson in supporting roles. It is about the experiences of a Jesuit missionary in 18th-century South America. The film is partly based on Paraguayan saint Roque González y de Santa Cruz and the Guaraní War.

The film premiered in competition at the 39th Cannes Film Festival, winning the Palme d'Or. At the 59th Academy Awards, it was nominated for seven awards including Best Picture and Best Director, winning for Best Cinematography. The film has also been cited as one of the greatest religious films of all time, appearing in the Vatican film list's "Religion" section and being number one on the Church Times's Top 50 Religious Films list.

== Plot ==
In the 1750s, Jesuit priest Father Gabriel enters the eastern Paraguayan jungle to convert the Guaraní to Christianity. He sends another priest to make contact with them, but the man is thrown to his death from Iguazu Falls. Father Gabriel travels to the falls and plays his oboe. One of the Guaraní grabs the oboe from his hands and breaks it in half. Father Gabriel does not react, and the remaining Guaraní, captivated by the music, take him to their village.

Captain Rodrigo Mendoza is a mercenary and slave trader, and a guest of the Spanish governor, Don Cabeza. His fiancée Carlotta confesses that she is in love with his brother Felipe. After Mendoza catches them sleeping together, he kills Felipe in a duel—‌an act that leaves him riddled with guilt. Father Gabriel, a friend of the governor's, challenges Mendoza to undergo penance. Mendoza is forced to accompany the Jesuits to their mission while dragging his heavy armor and sword behind him. The natives recognise their persecutor, but soon forgive a tearful Mendoza. Father Gabriel's mission is depicted as a place of sanctuary and education for the Guaraní. Moved by the Guaraní's acceptance, Mendoza wishes to help, and Father Gabriel gives him a Bible. In time, Mendoza takes vows and becomes a Jesuit.

With the protection offered under Spanish law, the Jesuit missions have been safe. The newly signed Treaty of Madrid reapportions land on which the missions are located, transferring it to the Portuguese. The Portuguese have no interest in converting the natives, viewing them as animals fit only for slavery. Aware that the Jesuits would likely oppose such efforts, Papal emissary Cardinal Altamirano, a Jesuit, is sent to survey the missions and decide which, if any, should be allowed to remain.

Under pressure from both Cabeza and the Portuguese emissary Hontar, Altamirano is forced to choose between two evils. If he rules in favour of the colonists, the indigenous peoples will become enslaved; if in favour of the missions, the Jesuit Order may be condemned by the Portuguese, and the Catholic Church could fracture. Altamirano visits the missions and is amazed at their success in converting the native peoples. At Father Gabriel's mission, he tries to explain the reasons behind closing the missions and instructs the Guaraní that they must leave because "it is God's will".

The Guaraní question this and argue that God's will is to develop the mission. Father Gabriel and Mendoza, under threat of excommunication, state their intention to defend the mission even at the cost of their lives. They are, however, divided on how to do it. Father Gabriel believes that violence is a direct crime against God. Mendoza, by contrast, decides to break his vows by militarily defending the mission. Against Father Gabriel's wishes, he teaches the Guaraní the European art of war.

When a joint Portuguese and Spanish force attacks, Mendoza and a Guaraní militia resist them. Their heroic defense is quickly overcome by the superior weaponry and numbers of the enemy. After breaking through and mortally wounding Mendoza, soldiers encounter the Jesuits of the mission leading the Guaraní women and children singing in a religious procession. Father Gabriel is at the head, carrying a monstrance with the Blessed Sacrament. The colonial forces organize a firing line and discharge their guns directly into the procession, killing the priests. After Mendoza sees Father Gabriel die before succumbing to his own wounds, a Guaraní man picks up the Blessed Sacrament and continues to lead the procession. Most of the natives are subsequently captured to be sold as slaves, but a small group of children manages to escape into the jungle.

In a final exchange between Altamirano and Hontar, the latter notes that what has happened was unfortunate but inevitable: "We must work in the world; the world is thus." Altamirano rejoins: "No, thus have we made the world. Thus have I made it." Days later, a canoe carrying the surviving children returns to the pillaged and burned mission, retrieving their belongings and departing up the river.

== Cast ==
- Robert De Niro as Captain Rodrigo Mendoza
- Jeremy Irons as Father Gabriel
- Ray McAnally as Cardinal Altamirano
- Aidan Quinn as Felipe Mendoza
- Cherie Lunghi as Carlotta
- Ronald Pickup as Hontar
- Chuck Low as Don Cabeza
  - Fred Melamed as Don Cabeza's voice (uncredited)
- Monirak Sisowath as Ibaye
- Liam Neeson as Father John Fielding
- Bercelio Moya as Native Boy
- Sigifredo Ismare as Witch Doctor
- Asuncion Ontiveros as Native Chief
- Alejandrino Moya as Chief's Lieutenant
- Daniel Berrigan as Sebastian
- Rolf Gray as Father Ralph
- Álvaro Guerrero as Jesuit

== Historical basis ==
The Mission is based on events surrounding the Treaty of Madrid in 1750, in which Spain ceded part of Jesuit Paraguay to Portugal. A significant subtext is the impending suppression of the Jesuits, of which Father Gabriel, who is a Jesuit, is warned by the film's narrator, Cardinal Altamirano. Altamirano, speaking in hindsight in 1758, corresponds to the actual Andalusian Jesuit Father Luis Altamirano, who was sent by Jesuit Superior General Ignacio Visconti to Paraguay in 1752 to transfer territory from Spain to Portugal. He oversaw the transfer of seven missions south and east of the Río Uruguay that had been settled by Guaraní and Jesuits in the 17th century. As compensation, Spain promised each mission 4,000 pesos—‌fewer than 1 peso for each of the approximately 30,000 Guaraní of the seven missions—‌while the cultivated lands, livestock and buildings were estimated to be worth 7–16 million pesos.

The film's climax is the Guaraní War of 1754–1756, during which historical Guaraní defended their homes against Spanish-Portuguese forces that were implementing the Treaty of Madrid. For the film, a re-creation was made of one of the seven missions, São Miguel das Missões.

Father Gabriel's character is loosely based on the life of Paraguayan saint and Jesuit Roque González de Santa Cruz. The story is taken from the book The Lost Cities of Paraguay by Father C. J. McNaspy, S.J., who was also a consultant on the film.

The waterfall setting of the film suggests the combination of these events with the story of older missions, founded between 1610 and 1630 on the Paranapanema River above the Guaíra Falls, from which Paulista slave raids forced Guaraní and Jesuits to flee in 1631. The battle at the end of the film evokes the eight-day Battle of Mbororé in 1641, a battle fought on land, as well as in boats on rivers, in which the Jesuit-organised, firearm-equipped Guaraní forces stopped the Paulista raiders.

=== Historical accuracy ===
The historical Altamirano was not a cardinal sent by the Pope, but an emissary sent by the Superior General of the Society of Jesus, Ignacio Visconti, to preserve the Jesuits in Europe in the face of attacks in Spain and Portugal.

James Schofield Saeger has many objections to the portrayal of the Guaraní in the movie. The film, in his opinion, is a "white European distortion of Native American reality". Native Americans are treated as "mission furniture".

The film asserts that the Guaraní accepted Christianity immediately, but in reality, native religious beliefs persisted for several generations. He believes that the movie glosses over the frequent resistance by Guaraní to Jesuit authority, as witnessed by several revolts and the refusal of many Guaraní to live in the missions.

== Production ==
In the 1970s producer Fernando Ghia had the idea for a film about the Jesuits in South America set around Iguazu Falls. He was inspired by a play from Fritz Hochwälder called The Holy Experiment. Ghia commissioned a script from Robert Bolt which was paid for by Paramount (which had a deal with Bolt and Ghia at the time). The script, originally called Guarani, was finished in 1976 but Paramount declined the opportunity to make it. Ghia spent ten years trying to raise finance for a film of the script under its new title The Mission and eventually attracted interest from Goldcrest Films. The project was championed by David Puttnam, who had just made The Killing Fields and recommended that film's director, Roland Joffé, for The Mission. Puttnam joined the film as co-producer. Warner Bros. Pictures provided $5 million. Several changes were made to the script after Joffé came on board. These included changing the character of the priest from that of an older man to a younger one.

Filming began in April 1985. The film was mostly filmed in Colombia, Argentina, Brazil and Paraguay. The tunnels of Fort Amherst in Kent were used as part of the monastery where Mendoza sequesters after murdering his brother.

Bodyguards had to be hired to protect Robert De Niro because the Medellín Cartel, led by Pablo Escobar, had threatened to kill any Americans found in Colombia, in retaliation for the Drug Enforcement Administration's cracking down on drug traffickers.

== Soundtrack ==
The Mission main theme
Gabriel's Oboe, from The Mission soundtrack by Ennio Morricone

The soundtrack for The Mission is written by Ennio Morricone. Beginning with a liturgical piece ("On Earth as It Is in Heaven") that becomes the "Spanish" theme, it quickly moves to the "Guaraní" theme, which is written in a heavily native style and uses several indigenous instruments. Later, Morricone defined The Mission theme as a duet between the "Spanish" and "Guaraní" themes. The soundtrack was recorded at CTS Lansdowne Studios in London.

Other themes throughout the movie include "Penance", "Conquest" and "Ave Maria Guaraní'. In the latter, a large choir of indigenous people sing a rendition of the "Ave Maria".

== Release ==
The film premiered in competition at the 39th Cannes Film Festival on 16 May 1986. It had its theatrical premiere in Madrid, Spain on 29 September 1986 before opening in 45 Spanish cities on 3 October. It opened in New York City on 31 October 1986.

== Reception ==
=== Box office ===
The film grossed $17.2 million in the US and international box office, against a budget of £16.5 million, which was the US equivalent of $25.4 million, making it a commercial disappointment.

Goldcrest Films invested £15,130,000 in the film and received £12,250,000 in returns, netting Goldcrest a £2,880,000 loss. This contributed to the dissolution of Goldcrest. In South Korea, the film was a commercial success, recording 525,630 admissions in Seoul during its initial theatrical release.

=== Critical response ===
The Mission received mixed-to-positive reviews from critics. The review aggregator Rotten Tomatoes reported that 63% of critics have given the film a positive review based on 30 reviews, with an average rating of 6.4/10. The site's critics consensus reads, "The Mission is a well-meaning epic given delicate heft by its sumptuous visuals and a standout score by Ennio Morricone, but its staid presentation never stirs an emotional investment in its characters." On Metacritic, the film has a weighted average score of 55 out of 100 based on 18 critic reviews, indicating "mixed or average" reviews.

Vincent Canby of The New York Times reviewed the film unfavourably and blamed Bolt for its shortcomings, citing Bolt's tendency to "state points without dramatising them, in fancy locutions that must be the stuff of the nightmares of sensible actors", his stock characters who lack "dramatic identity", each personifying "a pre-set attitude", and his sentimental portrayal of the Guaraní, who "are condescended to as mostly smiling, trusting, undifferentiated aspects of Eden—‌innocents with sweet singing voices and a lot of rhythm."

De Niro would later say of The Mission, "I thought it was a really wonderful, meaningful story [...] The idea of this man changing appealed to me a lot. It was an amazing experience and I liked Roland Joffé a lot. He's a good director with a lot of heart. Some people thought it was ponderous but I thought it was a wonderful movie. I'm partial, and I don't usually say that, but I thought it was."

=== Awards and honours ===
Institution	Category	Nominee(s)	Result	Ref.
Academy Awards	Best Picture	Fernando Ghia, David Puttnam	Nominated	
Academy Awards	Best Director	Roland Joffé	Nominated	
Academy Awards	Best Art Direction	Stuart Craig, Jack Stephens	Nominated	
Academy Awards	Best Cinematography	Chris Menges	Won	
Academy Awards	Best Costume Design	Enrico Sabbatini	Nominated	
Academy Awards	Best Film Editing	Jim Clark	Nominated	
Academy Awards	Best Original Score	Ennio Morricone	Nominated	
American Cinema Editors Awards	Best Edited Feature Film	Jim Clark	Nominated	
American Society of Cinematographers Awards	Outstanding Achievement in Cinematography in Theatrical Releases	Chris Menges	Nominated	
Association of Polish Filmmakers Critics Awards	Best Foreign Film	Roland Joffé	Won	
British Academy Film Awards	Best Film	Fernando Ghia, David Puttnam, Roland Joffé	Nominated	
British Academy Film Awards	Best Direction	Roland Joffé	Nominated	
British Academy Film Awards	Best Actor in a Supporting Role	Ray McAnally	Won	
British Academy Film Awards	Best Screenplay – Original	Robert Bolt	Nominated	
British Academy Film Awards	Best Cinematography	Chris Menges	Nominated	
British Academy Film Awards	Best Costume Design	Enrico Sabbatini	Nominated	
British Academy Film Awards	Best Editing	Jim Clark	Won	
British Academy Film Awards	Best Original Score	Ennio Morricone	Won	
British Academy Film Awards	Best Production Design	Stuart Craig	Nominated	
British Academy Film Awards	Best Sound	Ian Fuller, Bill Rowe, Clive Winter	Nominated	
British Academy Film Awards	Best Special Visual Effects	Peter Hutchinson	Nominated	
British Society of Cinematographers Awards	Best Cinematography in a Theatrical Feature Film	Chris Menges	Nominated	
Cannes Film Festival	Palme d'Or	Roland Joffé	Won	
Cannes Film Festival	Technical Grand Prize	Roland Joffé	Won	
César Awards	Best Foreign Film	Roland Joffé	Nominated	
David di Donatello Awards	Best Foreign Film	Roland Joffé	Nominated	
David di Donatello Awards	Best Foreign Actor	Jeremy Irons	Nominated	
David di Donatello Awards	Best Foreign Producer	Fernando Ghia, David Puttnam	Won	
Evening Standard British Film Awards	Best Actor	Ray McAnally (also for No Surrender)	Won	
Evening Standard British Film Awards	Best Screenplay	Robert Bolt	Won	
Golden Globe Awards	Best Motion Picture – Drama		Nominated	
Golden Globe Awards	Best Actor in a Motion Picture – Drama	Jeremy Irons	Nominated	
Golden Globe Awards	Best Director – Motion Picture	Roland Joffé	Nominated	
Golden Globe Awards	Best Screenplay – Motion Picture	Robert Bolt	Won	
Golden Globe Awards	Best Original Score – Motion Picture	Ennio Morricone	Won	
Kansas City Film Critics Circle Awards	Best Film		Won (Note: Tied with Salvador.)	
Los Angeles Film Critics Association Awards	Best Cinematography	Chris Menges	Won	
Los Angeles Film Critics Association Awards	Best Music Score	Ennio Morricone	Runner-up	
Nastro d'Argento	Best Foreign Actor	Robert De Niro	Nominated	
National Board of Review Awards	Top Ten Films		10th Place	
New York Film Critics Circle Awards	Best Cinematographer	Chris Menges	3rd Place	
Turkish Film Critics Association Awards	Best Foreign Film		3rd Place	

=== Lists ===
- 1995: Vatican Film List (Religion)
- 2005: AFI's 100 Years of Film Scores – #23
- 2007: Church Times' Top 50 Religious Films – #1
- 2013: ABC's Classic 100 Music in the Movies – #1

== See also ==
- Iguazu Falls
