= Michelangelo Tamburini =

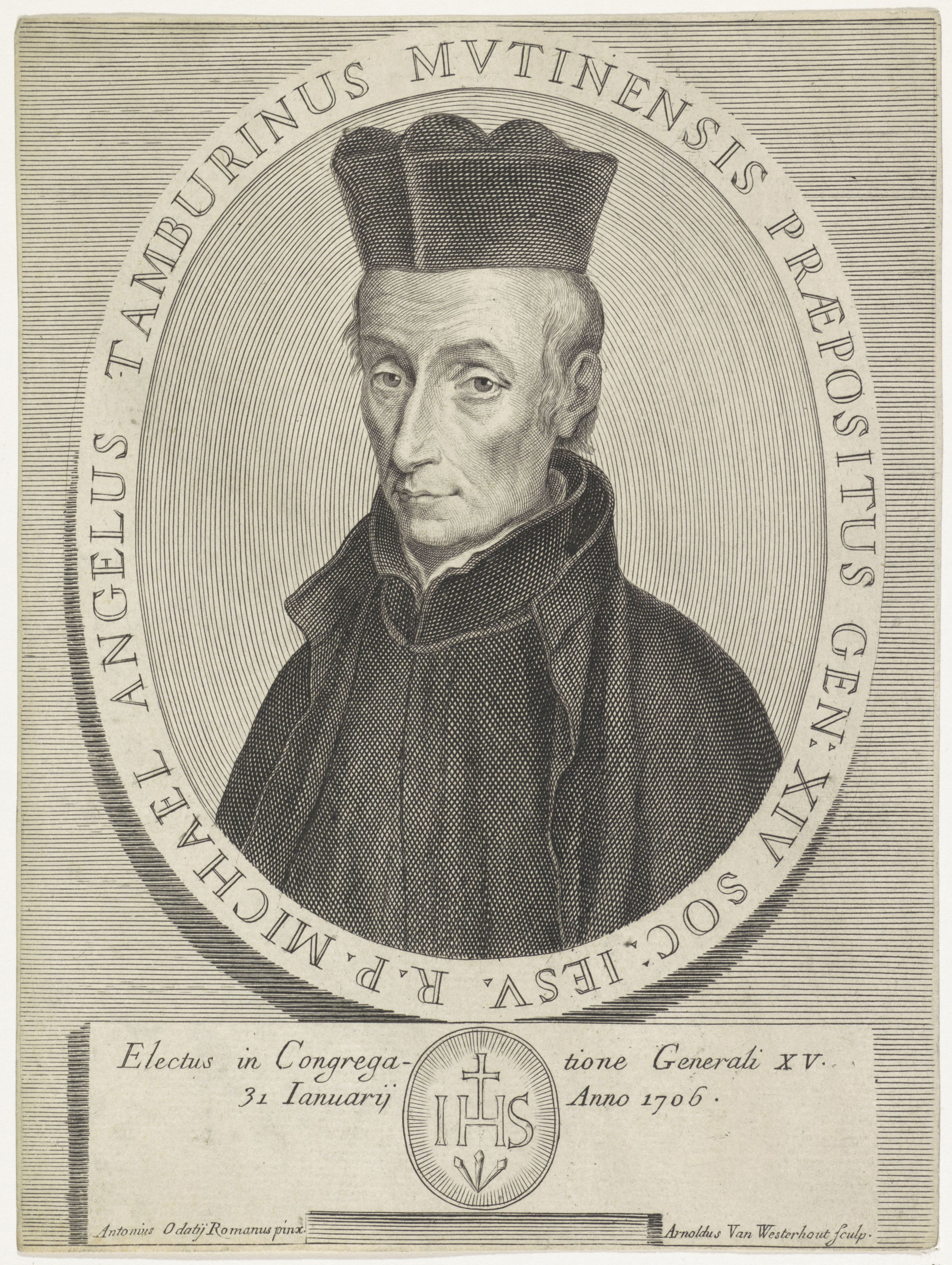
Michelangelo Tamburini

Michelangelo Tamburini (27 September 1648 – 28 February 1730) was an Italian Jesuit, who was elected fourteenth Superior General of the Society of Jesus from January 31, 1706 to February 28, 1730.

After teaching Scholastic philosophy and theology for twelve years, Tamburini became rector of several colleges. He was chosen by Rinaldo d'Este as his private theologian, held the offices of secretary general and vicar to Thyrsus Gonzalez, and finally, on the latter's death, was elected general on 3 January 1706, a post which he occupied for 24 years.

Tamburini died at the age of 82.

Catholic Church titles
Preceded by Thyrsus González de Santalla	Superior General of the Society of Jesus; 1706 – 1730	Succeeded by Franz Retz
