= Franz Retz =

Bohemian Jesuit

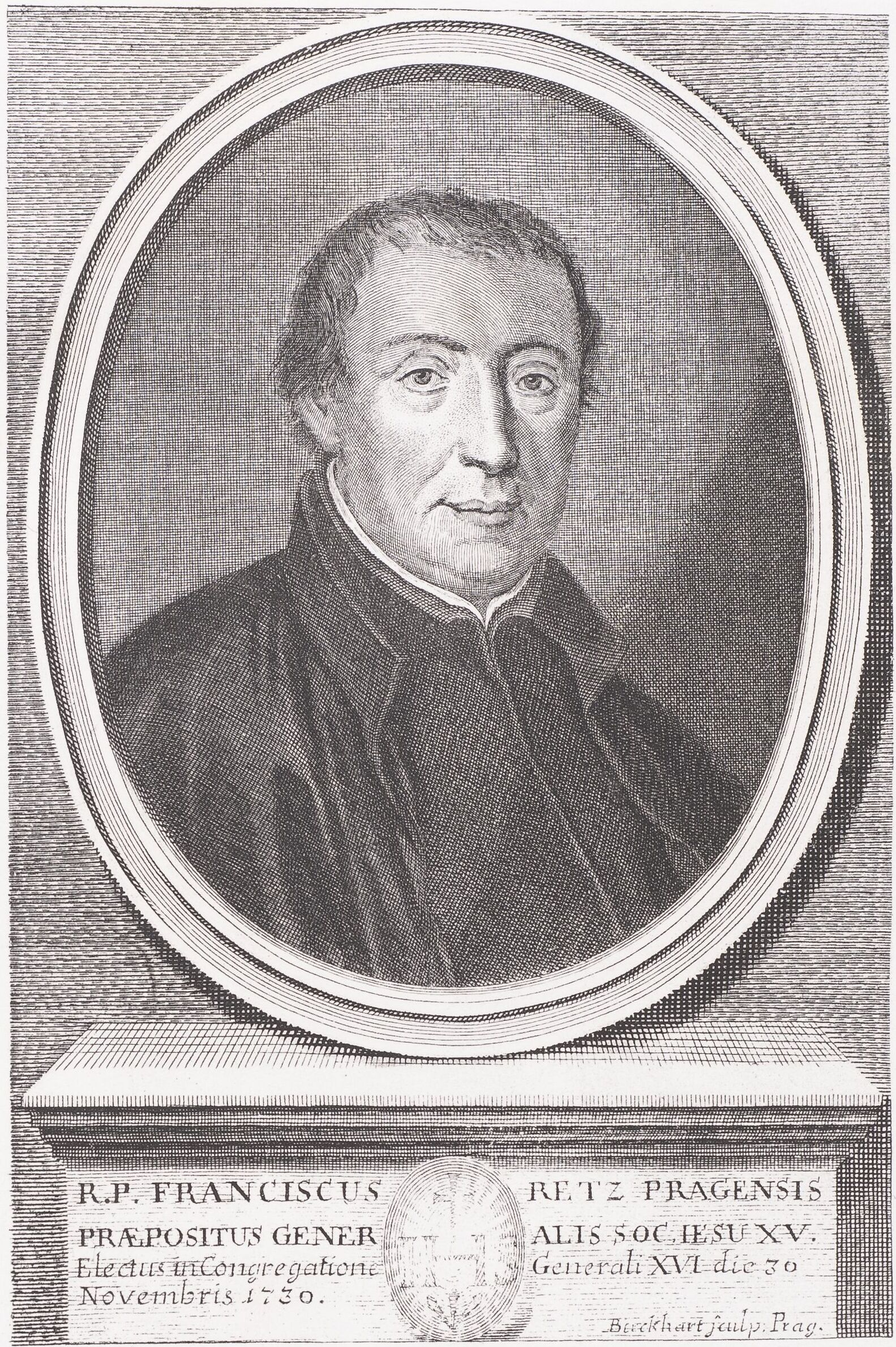

Franz Retz (sometimes Francis Retz) (13 September 1673 – 19 November 1750) was a Bohemian Jesuit, elected fifteenth Superior General of the Society of Jesus, which he governed from 7 March 1730 to 19 November 1750.

== Formation ==
After joining the Jesuits at the young age of 16 (in 1689) and doing his noviciate, he studied at the Faculty of Philosophy (1692–94) and Faculty of Theology (1700–03) of University of Olomouc. He obtained the doctorate in philosophy (Olomouc, 1703) and theology (Prague, 1709) and seemed destined to teach the same subjects.

=== In Rome ===
He had hardly begun to do so when he was called to Rome (1711) to fill certain administrative post. Provincial of Bohemia (today's Czech Republic) (1718–20) and Rector of the large High School of Prague (1720–23) he was called to Rome in 1725 by the then Superior General Michelangelo Tamburini as his Assistant for the Central European affairs. At the death of Tamburini (1730) Retz, as Vicar General of the Society, called the General Congregation.

=== Superior General ===
The sixteenth General Congregation elected him Superior General. The vote was nearly unanimous (68 of 70). His able administration contributed much to the welfare of the Society; he obtained the canonization of St. John Francis Regis (1738) and used the example of the saint to promote missionary work in the rural areas.

Father Retz's generalate was perhaps the quietest in the history of the order. There were difficulties in the Polish-Lithuanian Commonwealth and religious persecution in the Scottish Highlands and Islands following the Jacobite rising of 1745, but the Society's overseas missions developed as never before. The Society kept growing steadily. At the time of his death, it was made of thirty-nine provinces, twenty-four houses of professed fathers, 669 colleges, sixty-one novitiates, 335 residences, 273 mission stations, 176 seminaries, and 22,589 members of whom 11,293 were priests.

Catholic Church titles
Preceded by Michelangelo Tamburini	Superior General of the Society of Jesus; 1730–1750	Succeeded by Ignacio Visconti
Educational offices
Preceded by Leonard Ferdinand Meisner	Rector of Charles University in Prague; 1723	Succeeded by Václav Xaver Neumann z Puchholtze
