= Aloysius Centurione =

Italian Jesuit (1686–1757)

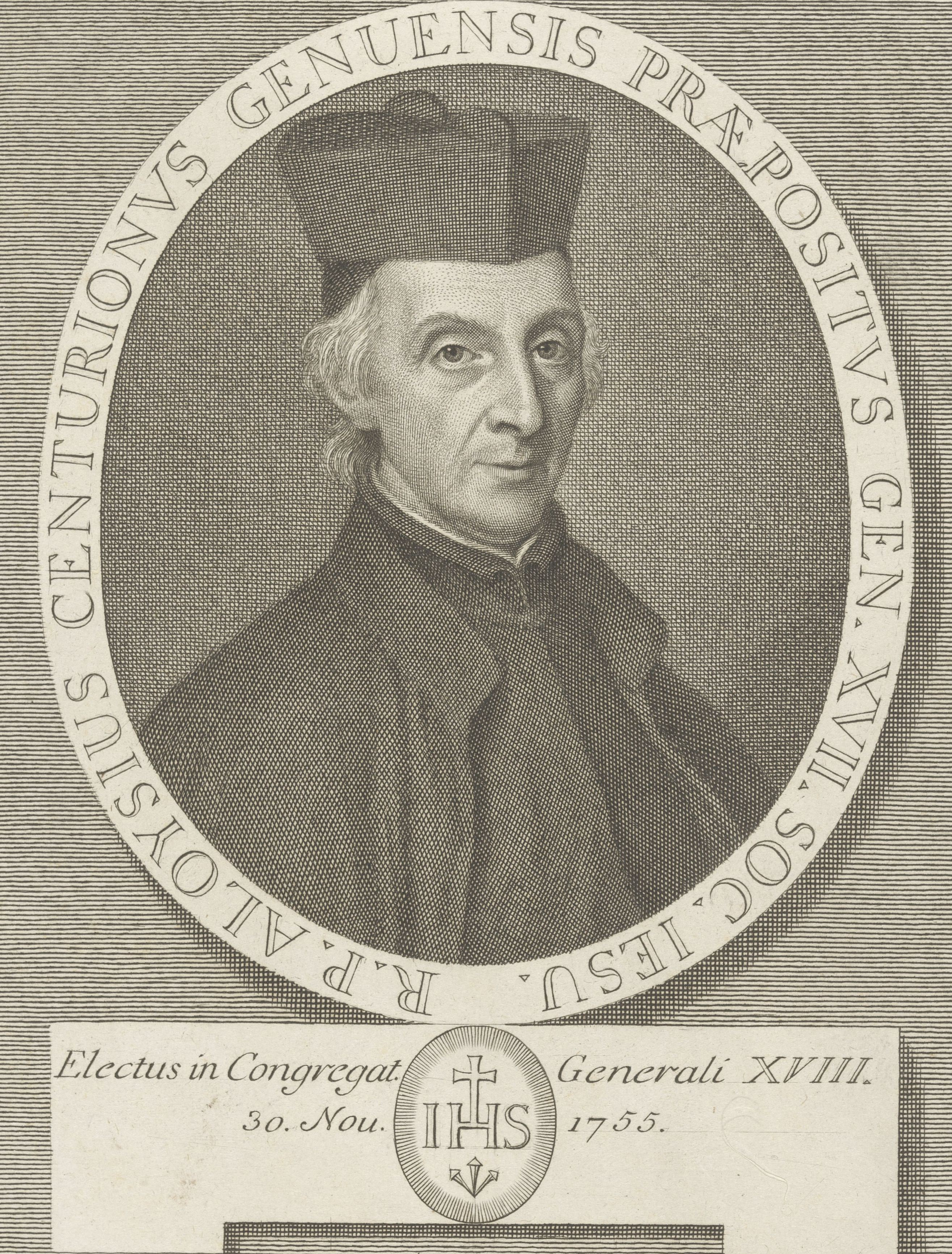
Very Rev. Alessandro Luigi Centurione, S.J.

Alessandro Luigi Centurione (29 August 1686 – 2 October 1757) was the seventeenth Superior General of the Society of Jesus.

== Early years ==
Coming from an illustrious family of Genoa, Centurione undertook his schooling in the Jesuit boarding school of Parma before joining the Society of Jesus in 1703. At the end of the usual spiritual and philo-theological Jesuit training, he was ordained priest in 1717. He seemed to be set on a teaching career (Letters, Philosophy and Theology) when he was appointed Provincial of Milan (1750). It was in such capacity that he took part at the General Congregation that elected Ignacio Visconti Superior General in 1751. Visconti kept him in Rome as Assistant for the Italian affairs and left a note to make him the Vicar General after his death.

== Superior General ==
Elected Superior General by the 18th General Congregation (30 November 1755), just a few days after the devastating Lisbon earthquake, he soon felt the effects of Pombal's international campaign against the Jesuits. Pombal's hostility towards the Society was compounded by the pamphlet of the Jesuit Gabriele Malagrida calling the devastating Lisbon earthquake 'God's punishment on Pombal's godlessness'. Malagrida was severely punished and harsh measures were taken against the Jesuits in Portugal. A first demand reached the dying pope Benedict XIV that the Society of Jesus be suppressed.

In the face of growing accusations of laxism in the Society's approach to moral questions, Centurione wrote a letter (1756) to all Jesuit Superiors insisting on the strengthening of Moral Theology training in Jesuit houses of formation. Earlier, as decreed by the General Congregation that elected him, Centurione had written a letter on the 'True spirit of the Society'. Clearly, there were troubled times ahead and Centurione felt that the spiritual life of his men had to be fortified in order to better face the coming storm.

The troubles caused by father Antoine de La Valette's risky commercial activities and the inept handling of his bankruptcy by the French Jesuits further complicated matters for Centurione and increased the group of those who felt that the Society was beyond reform.

The short term of his generalate did not allow him to do much. Yet, his affability and strength of character, not giving in to threat nor allowing himself or others to go for retaliatory moves, somehow – unknowingly – prepared his Jesuit companions to adopt the right attitude for what would happen in 1773, the suppression of the Society of Jesus.

Catholic Church titles
Preceded by Ignacio Visconti	Superior General of the Society of Jesus; 1755–1757	Succeeded by Lorenzo Ricci
