= Antoine Touron =

French Dominican biographer and historian

Antoine Touron (5 September 1686 – 2 September 1775) was a French Dominican biographer and historian.

== Biography ==
Touron was born at Graulhet, Tarn, France, the son of a merchant, and seems to have joined the Dominicans at an early age. After the completion of his studies he taught philosophy and theology to the students of his province (Toulouse); but the later years of his life were devoted to biography, history, and apologetics. He died at Paris.

== Works ==
Touron wrote twenty-nine books, dealing largely with the history of the Dominican order and the biographical sketches of its notable men. Daniel-Antonin Mortier, in his Histoire des maîtres généraux de l'ordre des frères prêcheurs, made generous use of his Histoire des hommes illustres.

Touron's writings include:

- Vie de saint Thomas d'Aquin
- Vie de saint Dominique avec une hist. abrégée des ses premiers disciples
- Hist. des hommes illustres de l'ordre de saint Dominique
- De la providence, traité hist., dogmat. et mor.
- La main de Dieu sur les incrédules, ou hist. abrégée des Israélites
- Parallèle de l'incrédule et du vrai fidèle
- La vie et l'esprit de saint Charles Borromée
- La verité vengée en faveur de saint Thomas
- Hist. génerale de l'Amérique depuis sa découverte, an ecclesiastical history of the New World.
