= Ignacio Visconti =

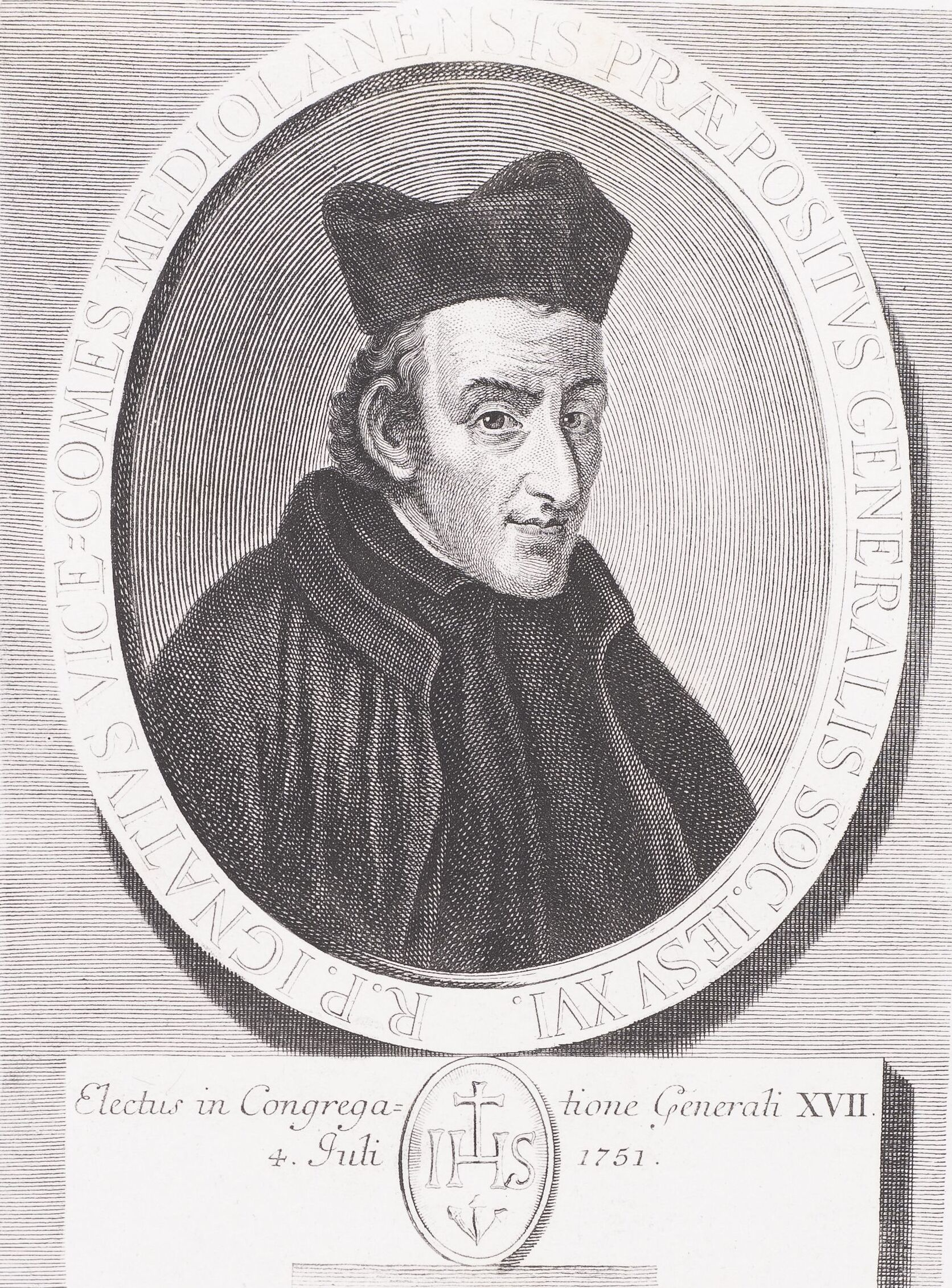
Ignazio Visconti

Ignazio Visconti (31 July 1682 - 4 May 1755) was an Italian Jesuit, elected sixteenth Superior General of the Society of Jesus, which he governed from 4 July 1751 to 4 May 1755.

== Formation and early career ==
Visconti was born in Milan, Italy. A student of the Parma Jesuit school, he joined the Society of Jesus in 1702, in spite of his family opposition.

After the usual spiritual formation and Philo-Theological training, Visconti was a teacher of Letters for twenty years. In addition, he was professor of Philosophy in Milan. In his spiritual ministry, he was giving special attention to the strengthening of the Marian Congregations (nowadays known as the Christian life community). For three years (1732–35), he was provincial of Milan.

In 1737, he was called to Rome as Assistant of Franz Retz for the Italian affairs of the Society.

Catholic Church titles
Preceded by Franz Retz	Superior General of the Society of Jesus; 1751–1755	Succeeded by Aloysius Centurioni
