= Treaty of Whitehall =

1686 treaty between France and England

The Treaty of Whitehall (or the Treaty of American Neutrality) was signed between Louis XIV of France and James II of England on 26 November 1686 (16 November O.S.). They agreed that a European conflict would not disrupt peace and neutrality in New France and New England and declared that "though the two Countries might be at war in Europe their Colonies in America should continue in peace and Neutrality." The treaty specifically prohibited each nation from fishing or trading in the other's territory and each power from aiding Indian tribes who might be at war with the other.

The treaty was short-lived, however, and was broken following the outbreak of King William's War in 1689, the first in the series of French and Indian Wars.

== Sources ==
- Doyle, John Andrew (1907). English Colonies in America. New York: Henry Holt (No copyright in the United States). p. 180.
- Faragher, John Mack (2005). A Great and Noble Scheme: The Tragic Story of the Expulsion of the French Acadians from Their American Homeland. W.W Norton & Company. ISBN 978-0-393-05135-3.
