= Arboretum de Tigny-Noyelle =

Arboretum in Tigny-Noyelle, Pas-de-Calais, Nord-Pas-de-Calais, France

Coordinates: 50.35°N 1.7°E

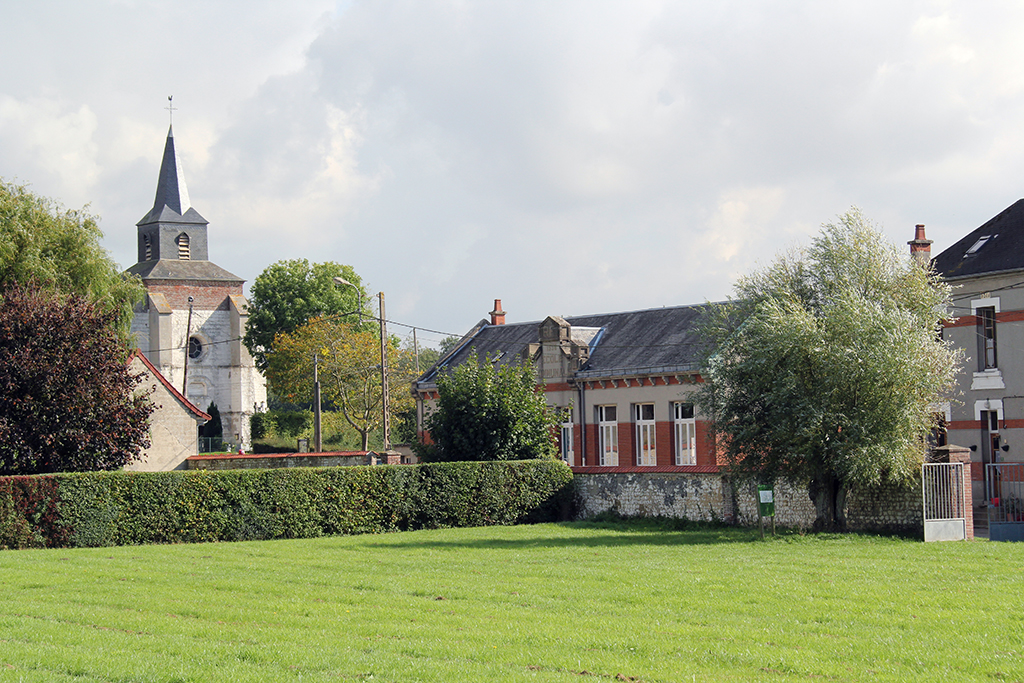
Arboretum de Tigny-Noyelle

The Arboretum de Tigny-Noyelle is an arboretum located in Tigny-Noyelle, Pas-de-Calais, Nord-Pas-de-Calais, France. The arboretum was created in 2001 and now contains about 120 varieties of trees.

== See also ==
- List of botanical gardens in France
