= Tigny-Noyelle =

- Commune
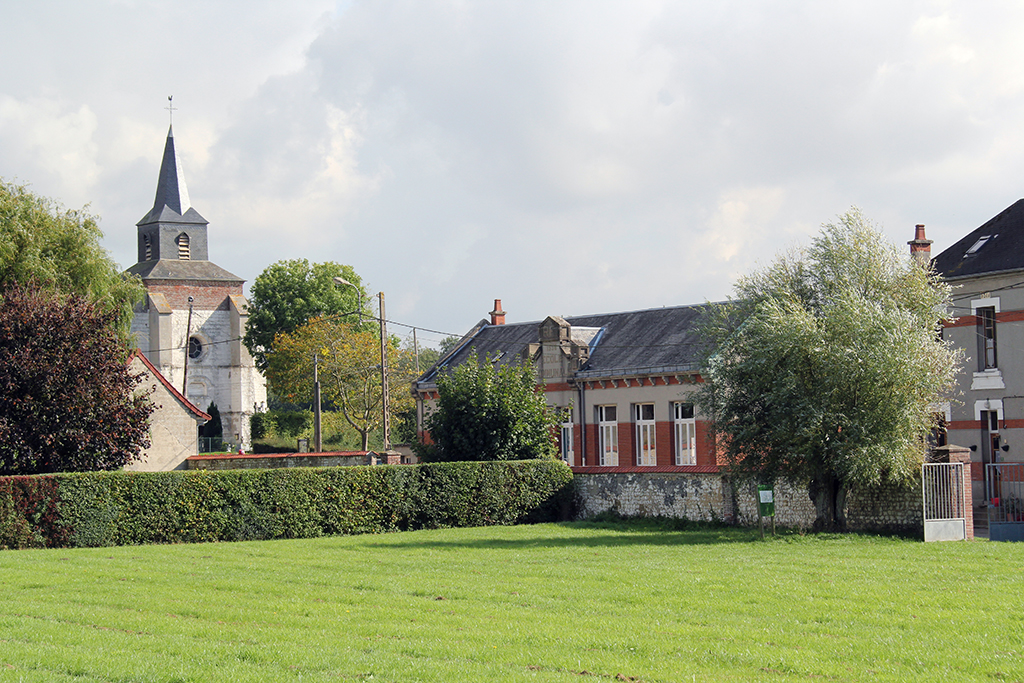
- The centre of Tigny-Noyelle

- Coat of arms
- Location of Tigny-Noyelle
- Location within France Location within Hauts-de-France
- Coordinates: 50°21′13″N 1°42′24″E
- Country: France
- Region: Hauts-de-France
- Department: Pas-de-Calais
- Arrondissement: Montreuil
- Canton: Berck
- Intercommunality: CA Deux Baies en Montreuillois

Government
  - Mayor (2024–2026): Jeremy Pernak
- Area^{1}: 6.76 km^{2} (2.61 sq mi)
- Elevation: 26 m (85 ft)
- Highest elevation: 49 m (161 ft)
- Lowest elevation: 2 m (6.6 ft)
- Population (2023): 163
  - Density: 24.1/km^{2} (62.5/sq mi)
- Time zone: UTC+01:00 (CET)
  - Summer (DST): UTC+02:00 (CEST)
- INSEE/Postal code: 62815 /62180
- ^{1} French Land Register data, which excludes lakes, ponds, glaciers > 1 km^{2} (0.386 sq mi or 247 acres) and river estuaries.

Tigny-Noyelle (French pronunciation: [tiɲi nwajɛl]) is a commune in the Pas-de-Calais department in the Hauts-de-France region of France.

== Geography ==
Tigny-Noyelle is located 8 miles (11 km) south of Montreuil-sur-Mer on the D143 road and very near the A16 autoroute, in the valley of the Authie. The village has an arboretum, the Arboretum de Tigny-Noyelle, which includes all species of the region. The village is the hometown of an international festival of classical music Musica Nigella that takes place every year between May and June.

== Population ==
Historical population
Year	Pop.	±% p.a.
1968	190	—
1975	165	−2.00%
1982	185	+1.65%
1990	198	+0.85%
1999	196	−0.11%
2007	161	−2.43%
2012	164	+0.37%
2017	174	+1.19%
2023	163	−1.08%
Source: INSEE

== Places of interest ==
- The church of Notre-Dame, dating from the fifteenth century

== See also ==
- Communes of the Pas-de-Calais department
