= Peter von Bemmel =

German artist (1686–1754)

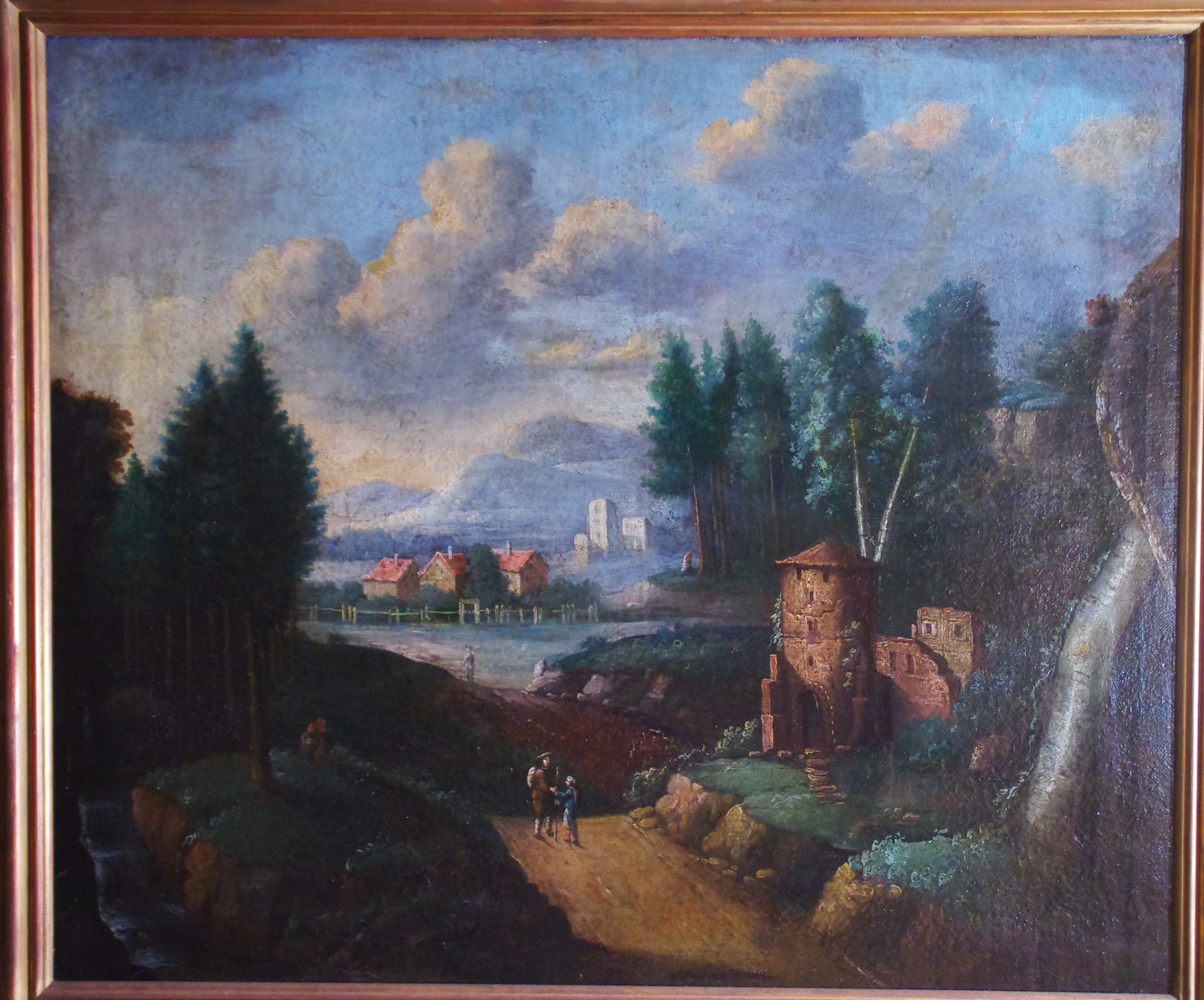
Landscape by Peter von Bemmel

Peter von Bemmel (18 August 1686 – 22 October 1754) was a landscape artist from the Holy Roman Empire.

Von Bemmel was born in Nuremberg in 1686, the second son and pupil of Willem van Bemmel. He painted landscapes, and was especially successful in representing thunderstorms and winter scenes. His works are seen in the galleries of the Herzog Anton Ulrich Museum and in his native city. He etched six plates of landscapes, and died at Ratisbon in 1754. His sons, Christoph and Johann Christoph von Bemmel, followed his profession.
