= Jean IV de Noyelles =

- Seigneur de Calonne, de Sailly, de Ricouart, Vicomte de Langle, Chambellan du Duc
- Born: c. 1365
- Died: 25 October 1415; Azincourt, France
- Spouse: Marguerite de La Viefville
- Issue: Jean V de Noyelles, seigneur de Calonne; Baudouin de Noyelles
- Father: Hugues III de Noyelles
- Mother: Louise d'Inchy, dame de Beaupré

Jean IV de Noyelles (born c. 1365 - died 25 October 1415) was a French nobleman and knight.

De Noyelles was born to Hugues III de Noyelles, vicomte de Calonne, and Louise d'Inchy, dame de Beaupré. He was killed at the Battle of Agincourt along with his two brothers Pierre de Noyelles, de Calonne and Lancelot de Noyelles, de Calonne.
