= Giovanni Paolo Oliva =

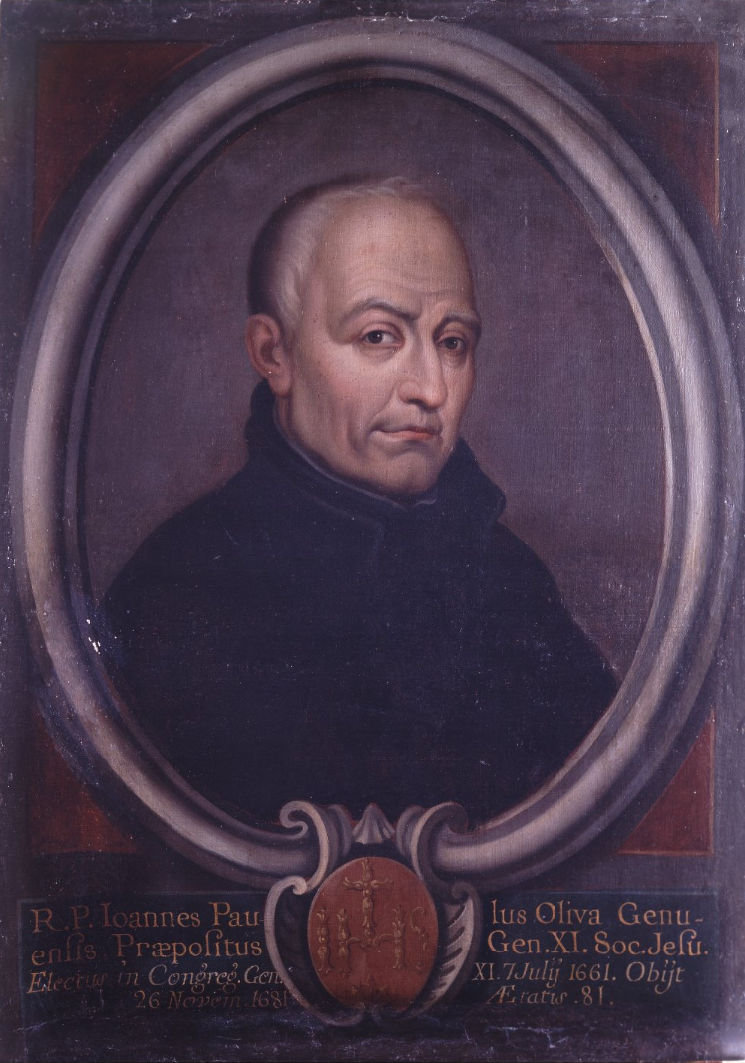
- Giovanni Paolo Oliva
- Born: 4 October 1600; Genoa, Italy
- Died: November 26, 1681 (aged 81); Rome, Italy

Giovanni Paolo Oliva (4 October 1600 – 26 November 1681) was the eleventh Superior General of the Society of Jesus.

== Biography ==
Oliva was born at Genoa in 1600, and in 1616 he entered the Society of Jesus. A famous pulpit orator, he was an Apostolic Preacher of the Palace under Popes Innocent X, Alexander VII, Clement IX, and Clement X. In 1661, during the disease of the Superior General Goschwin Nickel, the General Congregation XI elected him vicar-general with the right of succession. His chief aim was to remove all causes of dissension and of personal friction between his institute and other religious orders, towards which he showed himself most reverent and yielding. He extended and increased the missions, creating new ones outside of Europe, especially in Japan. His book of forty-odd sermons for Lent, and his work of six folio volumes, In Selecta Scripturae Loca Ethicae Commentationes, demonstrate his scholarship and piety. Remembering what had happened to Cardinal Francesco Sforza Pallavicino, Oliva printed one thousand of his letters, in order that they might not be printed by others and be misconstrued.

== Popish Plot ==
In 1678, the English informer Titus Oates named him as one of the ringleaders of the Popish Plot, a supposed Catholic conspiracy to kill King Charles II of England, which in fact was entirely Oates' own fabrication. Fortunately for Oliva, unlike the many English Jesuits who suffered in the plot, he was safely out of reach of the English authorities. Oates had never met him but was acquainted with several English Jesuits, and knew enough about the society to make it appear that he was in the Jesuits' confidence. In reality, Oliva could have no motive to kill King Charles, who was himself an all but open Roman Catholic, and Oliva may even have corresponded with him, as he certainly did with his brother, the future King James II of England. In addition, he took a strong view of the unlawfulness of attempting to overthrow a sovereign ruler, stating that if any Jesuits had engaged in such actions (while stressing that he thought it most improbable that they had) they deserved to suffer the full penalties of the law.

He died at Sant'Andrea al Quirinale in Rome.

Catholic Church titles
Preceded by Goschwin Nickel	Superior General of the Society of Jesus; 1664–1681	Succeeded by Charles de Noyelle
