= Ignatius of Santhià =

Italian Roman Catholic saint

Saint Ignatius of Santhià O.F.M. Cap.
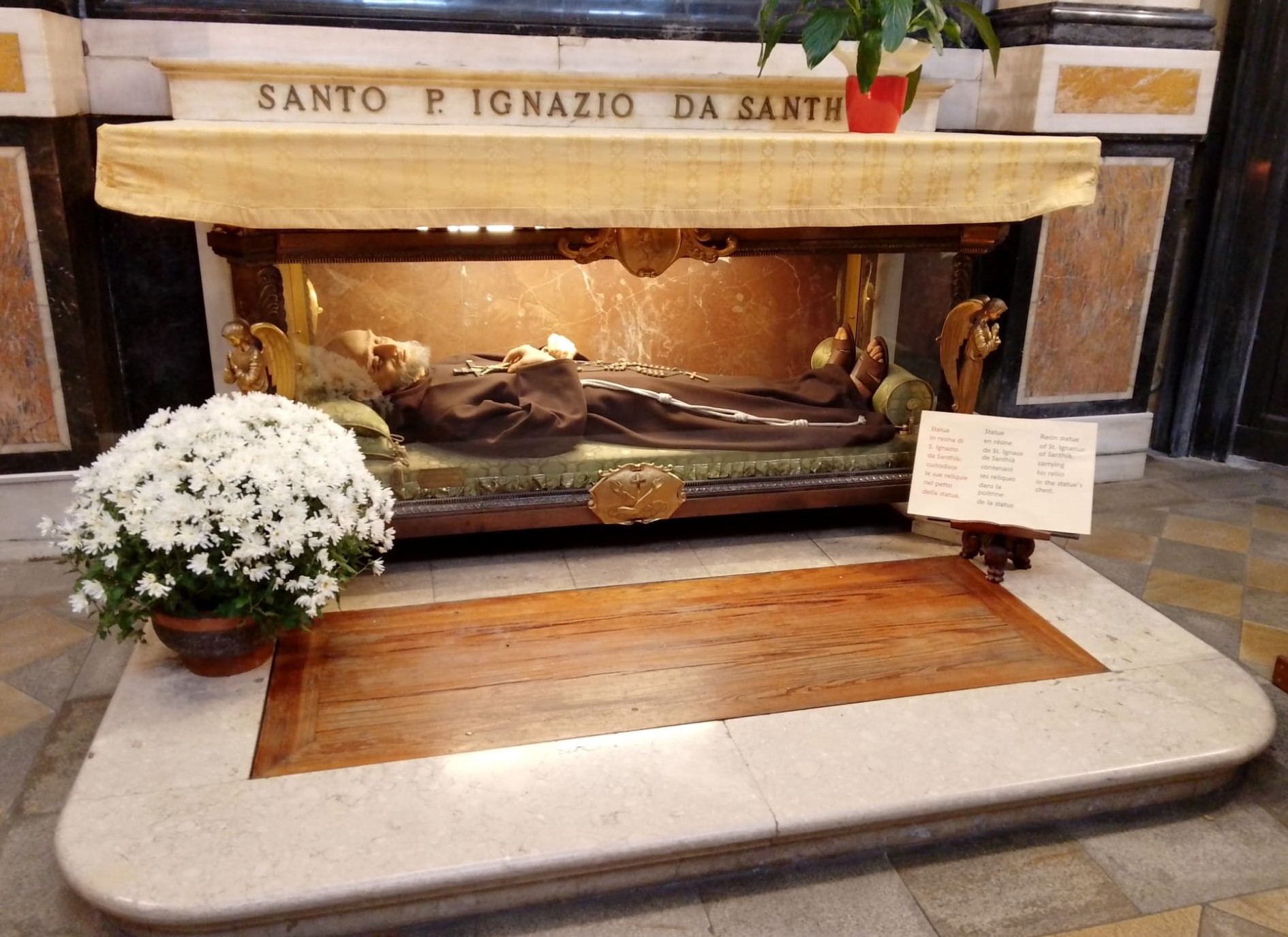
- Resin statue of St. Ignatius of Santhià, containing the saint's relics in its chest, in the church of Santa Maria al Monte dei Cappuccini in Turin.

Priest
- Born: 5 June 1686; Santhià, Vercelli, Duchy of Milan
- Died: 22 September 1770 (aged 84); Turin, Kingdom of Sardinia
- Venerated in: Roman Catholic Church
- Beatified: 17 April 1966, Saint Peter's Basilica, Vatican City by Pope Paul VI
- Canonized: 19 May 2002, Saint Peter's Square, Vatican City by Pope John Paul II
- Feast: 22 September
- Attributes: Capuchin habit; Rosary
- Patronage: Chaplains; Santhià

Ignatius of Santhià (5 June 1686 – 22 September 1770), born Lorenzo Maurizio Belvisotti, was an Italian Roman Catholic priest and a professed member of the Order of Friars Minor Capuchin.

Belvisotti made it his mission to help penitents in the sacrament of Reconciliation and also devoted himself to the care of the ill. He gained a strong reputation for the humble and austere nature of his life in addition to the application of the Franciscan charism in his life which served as a model for thousands.

He was canonized in 2002 after three miracles had been attributed to him and as recognition for his long life of service and heroic virtue.

== Life ==
Lorenzo Maurizio Belvisotti was born in Vercelli on 5 June 1686 as the fourth of six children to Pietro Paolo Belvisotti and Maria Elisabetta Balocco. His education came from a local priest - Bartolomeo Quallio - who inspired him to discern a potential call to religious life. His education came at the age of seven after the death of his father. He travelled to Vercelli from his village for theological and philosophical studies in 1706.

He was ordained to the priesthood in 1710 and remained as a parish priest until 1716. He was offered a position of power in Vercelli but he declined it and instead became a novice in the Order of Friars Minor Capuchin. He made his religious profession on 24 May 1717 and assumed the name of "Ignatius of Santhià" - this earned the ire of his parents who did not understand his decision to join the order. He assumed his name in honor of Saint Ignatius of Loyola. He was assigned to a convent in Saluzzo in 1717 and served as a sacristan there. He was also a novice master at Chieri for a time and a sacristan in Turin in 1723. He also served as the novice master at Mondovi from 1731 to 1744 but an ailment in one of his eyes caused him to retire from the position for two years.

Between 1743 and 1746 war broke out in Piedmont. After he had recovered from his near blindness he became the head chaplain of the armies of Charles Emmanuel III who were combating the Franco-Hispanic forces. He gained a strong reputation for his work with the injured. He also worked in that position in hospitals in both Asti and Alessandria. He returned to his old life after the conflict ceased where he served as a confessor and religious instructor. He continued to visit the ill and the poor across Turin and ministered to the thousands that flocked to receive his blessing and would often state: "Paradise is not made for slackers. Let's get to work".

He died on 22 September 1770 with a reputation for holiness and hailed as a saint across Turin where he died.

== Canonization ==
He had a formidable reputation as a saint after his death and it led to numerous petitions for his sainthood. The first process - which granted him the title Servant of God - spanned from 1777 until 1780 when it closed after the conclusion of its work. A second process opened sometime later to follow suit. These occurred despite the fact that the formal introduction to the cause did not occur until the pontificate of Pope Pius VI on 23 February 1782. Both local processes in Turin were granted the formal decree of ratification on 24 September 1791 in order for the cause to proceed to the next stage.

He was proclaimed to be Venerable on 19 March 1827 after Pope Leo XII recognized the fact that he had lived a life of heroic virtue.

Two miracles that were said to be attributed to his intercession were placed under investigation in two diocesan tribunals and both were granted their ratification on 19 October 1963. Pope Paul VI approved them both and beatified him on 17 April 1966.

The third and final miracle for sainthood was investigated in 1993 and was ratified on 3 June 1994. Pope John Paul II approved the miracle on 20 December 2001 and canonized him on 19 May 2002.

His body lies under the altar in the left chapel in the Church of Santa Maria al Monte dei Cappuccini, Turin.
