= Antoine Lavalette =

French Jesuit slaveholding priest and missionary (1708–1767)

Antoine Lavalette, SJ (also de La Valette, and born Valete; 26 October 1708 – 13 December 1767) was a French Jesuit priest and missionary known for his slaveholding. In 1741 he was sent to the Caribbean island of Martinique. In 1753, he was named superior of the Martinique mission. His impecunious investments and commercial speculation led to large debts. Lavalette owned large plantations and 400 African slaves. He was accused, but never prosecuted, of torturing and murdering four slaves.

Lavalette resigned from the Jesuits in 1762. The debts incurred by Lavalette resulted in the seizure of much of the Jesuit's property in France and the "Lavalette affair" was a factor in the French Parliament's ban of the Jesuits from France in 1764.

== Martinique ==
In 1741, Lavalette, a Jesuit priest, was assigned to foreign missions. In 1742 he arrived on the Caribbean island of Martinique, a French colony with an economy dominated by large plantations growing coffee, sugar cane and other crops for export. Martinique had a population of 80,000 of whom 65,000 were African slaves and the remainder mostly French. In 1753, Lavalette became superior general of the Jesuit's Martinique Mission.

Lavalette attempted to expand the mission's revenues by investments. He purchased rental properties and in 1748 a plantation with 18 African slaves on the nearby island of Dominica. Soon, he had more than 200 slaves working on Jesuit-owned plantations on Martinique and another 194 slaves working on Dominica. The Jesuits were one of the largest land owners and slaveholders in the Caribbean. Rather than seeing slaves as potential converts to Catholicism, Lavalette looked on them as investments, writing that a slave must recoup in production his purchase price in five years and also contribute to the expenses of running the plantation.

The Jesuits had a lengthy history of dealing with slavery in their foreign missions. In the 16th century, Jesuit superiors generally forbade slavery in missions, but their injunctions were largely ignored. In the 17th century, several Jesuit theologians wrote justifications of slavery and dissenters were silenced or punished. By Lavalette's time the Jesuits owned more than 20,000 slaves worldwide, most of them in the Americas. Although some Jesuits dissented, other Jesuits approved of torture and corporeal punishment for slaves. In the Caribbean, the Jesuits participated in "an exploitative labor system built on fear." The African slaves far outnumbered plantation owners. The owners feared slave revolts and resorted to violence to control their slaves.

=== Business endeavors ===
In 1751, Lavalette began accepting deposits of funds from planters in exchange for commercial paper by which their deposits could be redeemed in Paris or Marseille. He was paid for this service in kind by cash crops or, in at least one case, by slaves. He also borrowed money and issued as payment lettres de change which could also be redeemed in France. In 1754 he was ordered to return to France to justify his commercial activities. When he returned to Martinique in 1755, his plantations had deteriorated. He began borrowing more money based on lettres de change. In 1756, his most important agent in France went bankrupt because they were unable to redeem the lettres de change Lavallete had issued to his creditors. The Jesuits in France attempted to pay the growing number of Lavalette's creditors and ordered an investigation of his business practices. Meanwhile, the Seven Years' War with England impoverished Martinique which was unable to export its products to France.

=== Investigations ===
In 1761, as the Seven Years' War was winding down, Jean-François de la Marche, a Jesuit visitor, journeyed to Martinique to investigate Lavalette. He found evidence that Lavalette had been responsible for torturing and killing four enslaved men and women. In justification, Lavalette said there were sorcerers and poisoners among the slaves. De la Marche was shocked, but "for Lavalette, accustomed to the sovereignty of the planter class, it was a rational response to a perceived threat from below." De la Marche's report of torture and killings by Lavalette came to the attention of Superior General Lorenzo Ricci who concluded that Lavalette was guilty of homicide, but did not order his punishment for that crime. However, Lavalette was ordered to return to Europe, convicted by the Jesuits of "profane commerce" and removed from his position. Lavalette resigned from the Jesuits in 1762. Other than Ricci's mention, the story of Lavalette's murders was ignored by the Jesuits until 1996 when a researcher uncovered de la Marche's report.

== Aftermath ==
The "Lavalette Affair" created a crisis for the Jesuits in France. By 1762, The debts Lavalette incurred totaled 6.2 million livres amounting to two-thirds of all the Jesuit's debt worldwide. Although they attempted to satisfy their creditors, the French parliament in 1762 ruled against the Jesuits and confiscated 38 of their 124 schools in France. In 1764, the parliament dissolved the Jesuit order in France and its colonies, halting the work of 3,330 French Jesuits. Lavalette died in 1767. The Jesuits did not return to work in France until 1814.
