= Charles de Noyelle =

Belgian Jesuit priest

Charles de Noyelle (28 July 1615 – 12 December 1686) was a Belgian Jesuit priest, elected the twelfth Superior General of the Society of Jesus.

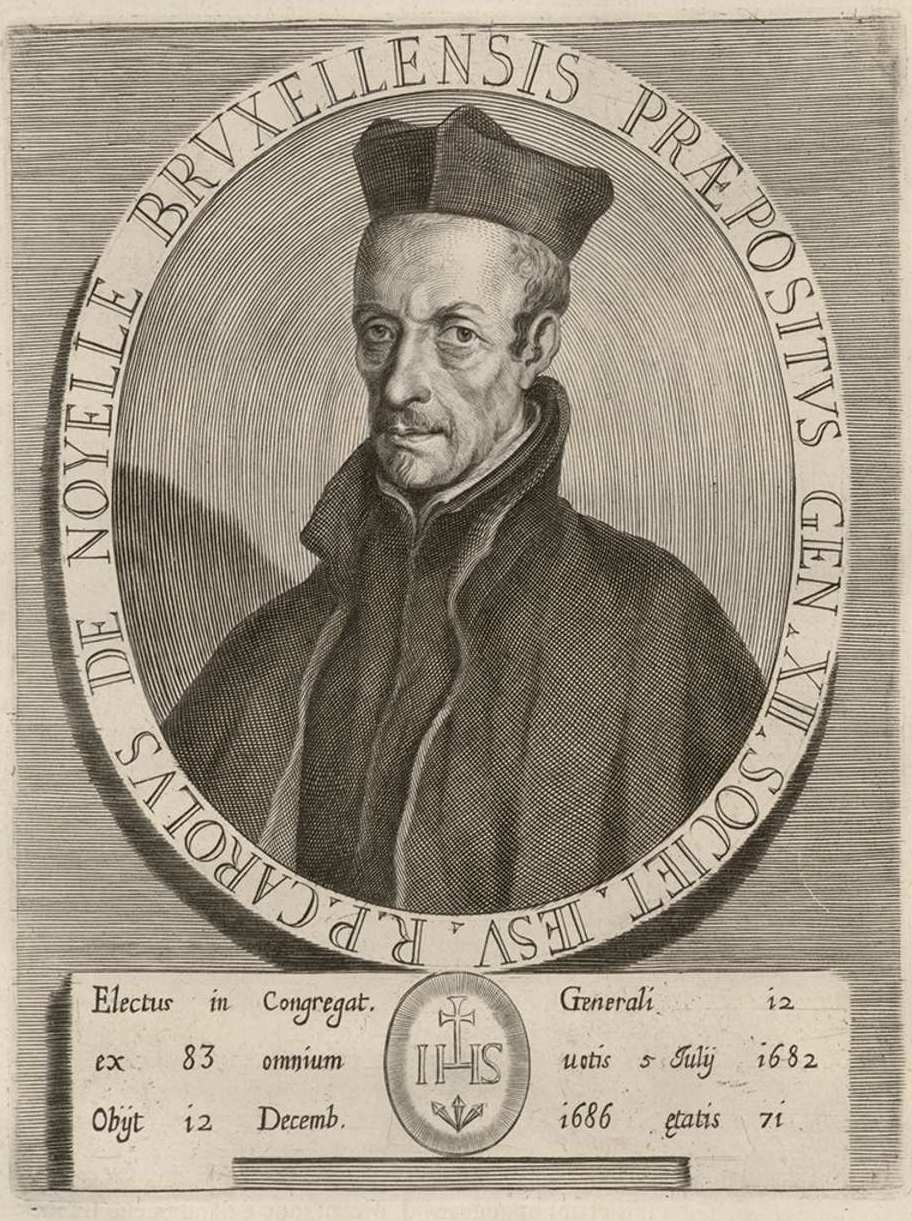
Charles de Noyelle

== Early formation ==
After secondary studies at Mons and Ypres, Charles de Noyelle joined the Jesuits at the early age of fifteen (in 1630). After following the usual spiritual training given to those newly entered into the Society, he did his Philosophy and Theology in Louvain, where he was ordained priest in 1644. He was destined to be professor of Theology, which he taught for some time in Antwerp. He had been Rector of the School of Kortrijk for three years when he was called to Rome as sub-secretary of the Society (1653)

== In Rome ==
As soon as he was elected Superior General (in 1661) Giovanni Paolo Oliva appointed de Noyelle as his Assistant for the German provinces' affairs. He remained in that post for 20 years, being made Vicar General of the Society on several occasions too. At the General Congregation that followed the death of Oliva, Charles de Noyelle was elected unanimously, at the first ballot, Superior General. This remains the only case (leaving aside Ignatius of Loyola) of a Superior General being elected unanimously.

== Problems and controversies ==
Just about the time of his election, the dispute between Louis XIV of France and Pope Innocent XI (over the Gallican Liberties, among other subjects) had culminated in the publication of the Déclaration du clergé de France. This placed the Society in a difficult position in France, as its attachment to the Universal Church and the Pope prevented the Jesuits to teach the Gallicanism of the Declaration. It required all the ingenuity and ability of the influential François de la Chaise and de Noyelle to prevent a break. The middle of the road position adopted by the Society dissatisfied Innocent XI with whom the Jesuits had otherwise good relations.

Even more delicate was the question of the Chinese Rites. Reports of Jesuits (in China) ignoring or rejecting openly the papal decree forbidding the so-called Chinese rites reached the Congregation of the Propaganda Fide, resulted in ill will towards the Society.

Catholic Church titles
| Preceded by Giovanni Paolo Oliva | Superior General of the Society of Jesus; 1682 – 1686 | Succeeded by Thyrsus González de Santalla |
