= List of Renaissance commentators on Aristotle =

This is a list of Renaissance commentators on the works of Aristotle, particularly those on natural philosophy and ethics.

== List ==
- Donato Acciaiuoli
- Alessandro Achillini
- Blasius of Parma
- Lodovico Boccadifero
- Simon Brossier
- Antonio Brucioli
- António de Gouveia
- Francesco Buonamici
- Joachim Camerarius
- John Case
- Giulio Castellani
- Juan de Celaya
- Josse Clichtove
- Gasparo Contarini
- Luis Coronel
- Sebastian Couto
- Gilbert Crab
- Cesare Cremonini
- Petrus Crockaert
- Petrus Ramus
- Johannes Dullaert
- Nicolas Dupuy
- Johannes Eck
- Felice Figliucci
- Galeazzo Florimonte
- Pedro da Fonseca
- George of Brussels
- Hubert van Giffen
- Emmanuel de Goes
- Johannes Herbetius
- Crisostomo Javelli
- Denys Lambin
- Giulio Landi
- Gaspar Lax
- Jacques Lefèvre d'Étaples
- Raffaele Maffei
- Johannes Magirus
- John Mair
- John of St Thomas
- Diego Mas
- Antonius a Matre Dei
- Marc-Antoine Muret
- Giulio Pace
- Paul of Venice
- Philipp Melanchthon
- Antonio Montecatini
- Agostino Nifo
- Benito Pereira
- Giovanni Pico
- Francesco Piccolomini
- Pietro Pomponazzi
- Giovanni Pontano
- Francis Robortello
- Antonio Rubio de Rueda
- Jakob Schegk
- Domingo de Soto
- Ciriaco Strozzi
- Francisco Suarez
- Antonius Sylvester
- Audomarus Talaeus (Omer Talon)
- Petrus Tartaretus
- Nicolaus Taurellus
- Gaetano da Thiene
- Alvarus Thomaz
- Frans Titelmans
- Franciscus Toletus
- Francisco Vallés
- Paulus Vallius (Paolo Valla)
- Pietro Martire Vermigli
- Nicoletto Vernia
- Johannes Versor
- Jacopo Zabarella
- Marcantonio Zimara
- Diego de Zúñiga
- Theodor Zwinger

== See also ==
- Scholastic philosophy
- List of Renaissance humanists
- List of medieval Latin commentators on Aristotle
