= List of medieval Latin commentators on Aristotle =

This is a list of commentators on the works of Aristotle who wrote in Latin, from the Late Antique to the last years of the European Middle Ages. The names are given in their Latin forms.

Sources: Taken from Charles H. Lohr, Commentateurs d'Aristote au Moyen-Âge Latin (1988).

- Aegidius Romanus
- Albertus Magnus
- Albertus de Saxonia
- Andreas de Biliis: Commentaries on Metaphysics and On the Heavens book 4.
- Bartholomaeus de Brugis
- Blasius Pelacanus de Parma
- Boethius
- Boethius de Dacia
- Bonaventura
- Caietanus de Thienis
- Christophorus Landinus
- Franciscus de Mayronis de Digna
- Franciscus Rubeus de Marchia
- Georgius Trapezuntius
- Godefridus de Fontibus
- Gualterus de Burley
- Guillelmus de Conchis
- Guillelmus de Heytesbury
- Guillelmus de Ockham
- Guillelmus de Shirwode
- Heimericus de Campo
- Henricus de Gandavo
- Henricus Heinbuche de Langenstein
- Henricus Totting de Oyta
- Hermannus Alemannus
- Jacobus Capocci de Viterbio
- Jacobus Veneticus
- Johannes Argyropulus
- Johannes Buridanus
- Johannes Duns Scotus
- Johannes de Glogovia
- Johannes de Janduno
- Johannes Pecham
- Johannes Saresburiensis
- Johannes Versoris
- Johannes Wyclif
- Laurentius Vallensis
- Leonardus Bruni Aretinus
- Marsilius de Inghen
- Marsilius Mainardinus
- Michael Scotus
- Nicolaus Oresme: Livre de Politiques
- Nicolettus Vernias Theatinus
- Paulus Nicolettus Venetus
- Petrus Abaelardus
- Petrus de Abano
- Petrus de Alliaco
- Petrus de Alvernia
- Petrus Hispanus
- Petrus Martinez de Osma
- Radulphus Reginaldi Britonis
- Remigius de Florentia
- Richardus de Lavenham commentaries on the Physics and Ethics
- Robertus Grosseteste
- Robertus de Kilwardby
- Rogerus Bacon
- Sigerus de Brabantia
- Simon de Faversham
- Stephanus Tempier
- Theodoricus Brito
- Thomas de Aquino
- Thomas Bradwardinus
- Thomas de Erfordia
- Thomas de Sutton

== See also ==
- List of Renaissance commentators on Aristotle
