= Antonio Trombetta =

Catholic Bishop of Urbino (1436–1517)

Most Reverend Antonio Trombetta
- Bishop of Urbino
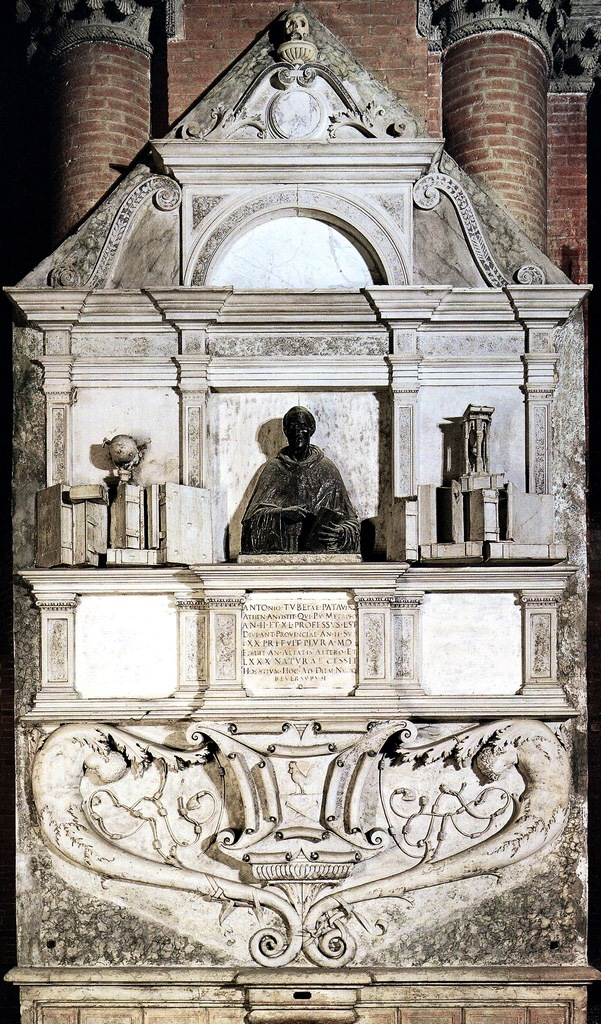
- Antonio Trombetta's funeral monument by Andrea Riccio
- Church: Catholic Church
- Diocese: Diocese of Urbino
- In office: 1511–1514
- Predecessor: Gabriele de' Gabrielli
- Successor: Domenico Grimani

Personal details
- Died: 6 March 1517 (aged 80–81)

Antonio Trombetta (1436 – 6 March 1517) was a Roman Catholic prelate and Scotist philosopher who served as Bishop of Urbino (1511–1514). His work exerted a strong influence on sixteenth- and seventeenth-century Scotism.

== Biography ==
Born in Padua in 1436, Trombetta graduated in theology at the Franciscan Studium generale at Padua on 2 June 1467. He taught metaphysics and theology in via Scoti at the University of Padua from 1476 or 1477 until 1511. On 7 November 1511, he was appointed during the papacy of Pope Julius II as Bishop of Urbino. He was a member of the papal commission that drafted the bull Apostolici Regiminis approved at the Fifth Council of the Lateran on 17 December 1513. He served as Bishop of Urbino until 1514. Trombetta died in 1517.

== Works ==
Trombetta's important Quaestiones quodlibetales and Quaestiones metaphysicales are thoroughly Scotistic in orientation and do battle with Thomas Aquinas and Trombetta's concurrent, the Dominican, Francesco Sicuro di Nardò. They were published at Venice in 1493 and again in a slightly revised form in 1502 and 1504. The 1493 edition also contains Trombetta's In tractatum formalitatum Scoti sententia, which was published apart in 1502. In 1498 he published an attack on Averroes's theory of the unity of the intellect and those contemporaries at Padua, namely Vernia and Nifo, who defended it philosophically. It is striking, however, that in this work Trombetta disagrees with Scotus and maintains that the immortality of the individual human soul can be demonstrated by human reason. Trombetta was frequently involved in debate with the eminent Thomist philosopher Thomas Cajetan, who bitterly criticised him in his commentary on Aquinas' De ente et essentia. He edited one of the first editions of Duns Scotus' In I sententiarum (Venice 1472).

== Bibliography ==
- Poppi, Antonino (1962). "Lo scotista patavino Antonio Trombetta (1436-1517)". Il Santo: Rivista Antoniana di storia dottrina arte. 2: 349–367.
- Poppi, Antonino (1967). "Trombetta, Antonio". New Catholic Encyclopedia. Vol. XIV. New York: McGraw Hill. p. 314.
- Mahoney, Edward Patrick (1976). "Antonio Trombetta and Agostino Nifo on Averroes and intelligibile species: A philosophical dispute at the University of Padua". In Antonino Poppi (ed.). Storia e cultura al Santo dal XIII al XX secolo. Vicenza: Neri Pozza. pp. 289–301.
- Lodone, Michele (2020). "TROMBETTA, Antonio". Dizionario Biografico degli Italiani (in Italian). Vol. 97: Trivulzio–Valeri. Rome: Istituto dell'Enciclopedia Italiana. ISBN 978-88-12-00032-6.
- Marrone, Francesco (2020). "Trombetta, Antonio". In Sgarbi, Marco (ed.). Encyclopedia of Renaissance Philosophy. Cham: Springer. pp. 3317–3319. doi:10.1007/978-3-319-02848-4_363-1.

== External links and additional sources ==
- Cheney, David M. "Archdiocese of Urbino-Urbania-Sant'Angelo in Vado". Catholic-Hierarchy.org. (for Chronology of Bishops) ^{[self-published]}
- Chow, Gabriel. "Archdiocese of Urbino-Urbania-Sant'Angelo in Vado (Italy)". GCatholic.org. (for Chronology of Bishops) ^{[self-published]}

Catholic Church titles
| Preceded by Gabriele de' Gabrielli | Bishop of Urbino; 1511–1514 | Succeeded by Domenico Grimani |
