= Porzio =

Porzio is an Italian surname that may refer to:

- Alfredo Porzio (1900–1976), Argentinian boxer
- Camillo Porzio (1526–1580), Italian historian
- Francesco Porzio (born 1966), Italian water polo player
- Giovanni Porzio (1873–1962), Italian politician and lawyer
- Lorenzo Porzio (born 1981), Italian rower
- Mike Porzio (born 1972), American baseball player
- Nino Porzio (born 1972), Italian singer and actor
- Pino Porzio (born 1967), Italian water polo player
- Simone Porzio (1496–1554), Italian philosopher
