= Giovanni Spartario =

Italian musical theorist (died 1339)

Giovanni Spartario (died 1339) was an Italian musical theorist.

== Biography ==
Born in Bologna, there he studied under Bartolommeo Ramos Pereja, and became professor of music in 1312 at the University of Bologna. He helped propagate the use of the musical notation proposed by Guido Aretino. He opposed some of the notations proposed by Niccolo Burzio of Parma and Francesco Gafurio of Lodi. He published his ideas in 1321, and died in 1339.
