= Renaissance philosophy =

Period of European thought (1355–1650)

Renaissance philosophy encompasses the philosophical thought of the period corresponding to the Renaissance in Europe, running roughly from 1400 to 1600. It therefore overlaps both with late medieval philosophy, which in the fourteenth and fifteenth centuries was influenced by notable figures such as Albert the Great, Thomas Aquinas, William of Ockham, and Marsilius of Padua, and early modern philosophy, which conventionally starts with René Descartes and his publication of the Discourse on Method in 1637.

== Continuities ==
The structure, sources, method, and topics of philosophy in the Renaissance had much in common with those of previous centuries.

=== Structure of philosophy ===
Following the recovery of a substaintial protion of the Aristotelian corpus in the 12th and 13th centuries, it became clear that beyond Aristotle's already familiar works on logic, numerous other treaties existed, broadly concering natural philosophy, moral philosophy, and metaphysics. These areas provided the structure for the philosophy curriculum of the emerging universities. The general assumption was that the most 'scientific' branches of philosophy were those that were more theoretical and therefore more widely applicable. During the Renaissance too, many thinkers saw these as the main philosophical areas, with logic providing a training of the mind to approach the other three.

=== Sources of philosophy ===
A similar continuity can be seen in the case of sources. Although Aristotle was never an unquestioned authority (he was more often than not a springboard for discussion, and his opinions were often discussed along those of others, or the teaching of Holy Scripture), medieval lectures in physics consisted of reading Aristotle's Physics, lessons in moral philosophy consisted of examinations of his Nicomachean Ethics (and often his Politics), and metaphysics was approached through his Metaphysics. The assumption that Aristotle's works were foundational to an understanding of philosophy did not wane during the Renaissance, which saw a flourishing of new translations, commentaries, and other interpretations of his works, both in Latin and in the vernacular. After the Reformation, Aristotle's Nicomachean Ethics continued to be the main authority for the discipline of ethics at Protestant universities until the late seventeenth century, with over fifty Protestant commentaries published on the Nicomachean Ethics before 1682.

In terms of method, philosophy was considered during the late Middle Ages as a subject that required robust enquiry on the part of people trained in the subject's technical vocabulary. Philosophical texts and problems were typically approached through university lectures and 'questions'. The latter, similar in some ways to modern debates, examined the pros and cons of particular philosophical positions or interpretations. They were one of the cornerstones of the 'scholastic method', made students who proposed or responded to questions quick on their feet, and required a deep familiarity with all of the known philosophical tradition, which would often be invoked in support of or against specific arguments. This style of philosophy continued to have a strong following in the Renaissance. Pico della Mirandola's Disputations, for instance, depended directly on this tradition, which was not at all limited to university lecture halls.

Bust of Aristotle, Roman copy after a Greek bronze original by Lysippos from 330 BC.

=== Topics in philosophy ===
Given the remarkable range of Aristotelian philosophy, it was possible to discuss all kinds of issues in medieval and Renaissance philosophy. Aristotle had treated directly problems such as the trajectory of missiles, the habits of animals, how knowledge is acquired, the freedom of the will, how virtue is connected with happiness, the relationship of the lunar and the sublunar worlds. Indirectly he had stimulated discussion on two points that were particularly of concern to Christians: the immortality of the soul and the eternity of the world. All of these continued to be of considerable interest to Renaissance thinkers, but we shall see that in some cases the solutions offered were significantly different because of changing cultural and religious landscapes.

== Discontinuities ==
Many aspects of philosophy were held in common during the Middle Ages and the Renaissance, it will now be useful to discuss in what areas changes were afoot. The same outline as above will be used, to show that within trends of continuity one can also find surprising differences.

=== Sources of philosophy ===
Many aspects of philosophy were held in common during the Middle Ages and the Renaissance, but the Renaissance in other ways also differed in its philosophical content, partly also due to philosophical sources. The Renaissance saw a significant broadening of source material. Plato, known directly only through two and a half dialogues in the Middle Ages, came to be known through numerous Latin translations in fifteenth century Italy, culminating in the hugely influential translation of his complete works by Marsilio Ficino in Florence in 1484. Petrarch was not able to read Plato directly, but he greatly admired him. Petrarch was also a great admirer of Roman poets such as Virgil and Horace and of Cicero for Latin prose writing. Not all Renaissance humanists followed his example in all things, but Petrarch contributed to a broadening of his time's 'canon' (pagan poetry had previously been considered frivolous and dangerous), something that happened in philosophy as well. In the sixteenth century anyone who considered himself 'au fait' read Plato as well as Aristotle, trying as much as possible (and not always very successfully) to reconcile the two with each other and with Christianity. This is probably the main reason why Donato Acciaiuoli's commentary on Aristotle's Ethics (first published in 1478) was so successful: it blended the three traditions beautifully.

Other movements from ancient philosophy also re-entered the mainstream. While this was seldom the case for Epicureanism, which was largely caricatured and considered with suspicion, Pyrrhonism and Academic Skepticism made a comeback thanks to philosophers such as Michel de Montaigne, and Neostoicism became a popular movement due to the writings of Justus Lipsius. In all of these cases it is impossible to separate the pagan philosophical doctrines from the Christian filter through which they were approached and made legitimate.

=== Structure of philosophy ===
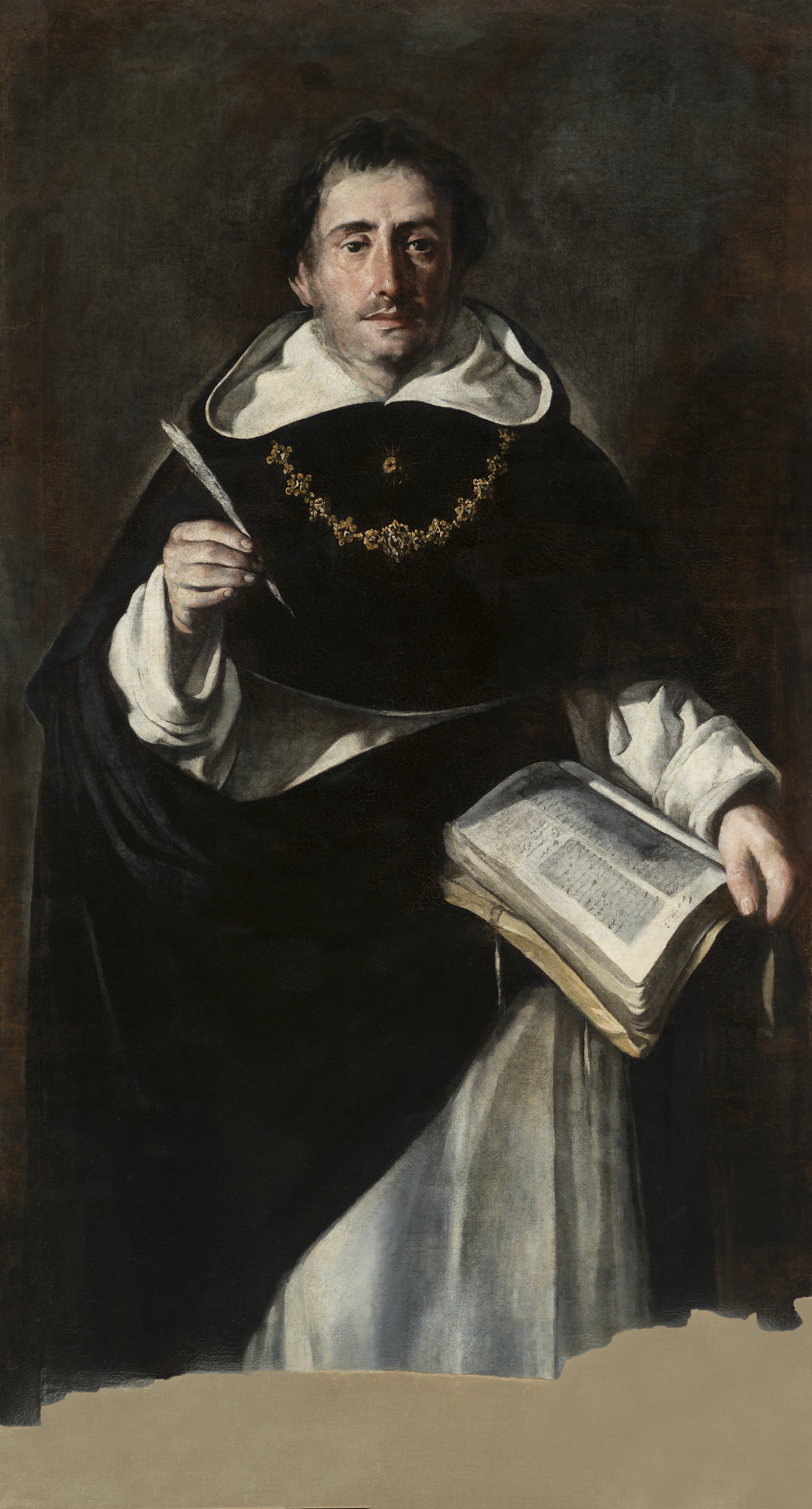
Portrait of St. Thomas by Antonio del Castillo y Saavedra, ca. 1649

While generally the Aristotelian structure of the branches of philosophy stayed in place, interesting developments and tensions were taking place within them. In moral philosophy, for instance, a position consistently held by Thomas Aquinas and his numerous followers was that its three subfields (ethics, economics, politics) were related to progressively wider spheres (the individual, the family and the community). Politics, Thomas thought, is more important than ethics because it considers the good of the greater number. This position came under increasing strain in the Renaissance, as various thinkers claimed that Thomas's classifications were inaccurate, and that ethics were the most important part of morality.

Other important figures, such as Francesco Petrarca (Petrarch) (1304–1374), questioned the whole assumption that the theoretical aspects of philosophy were the more important ones. He insisted, for instance, on the value of the practical aspects of ethics. Petrarch's position, expressed both strongly and amusingly in his invective On His Own Ignorance and That of Many Others (De sui ipsius ac multorum ignorantia) is also important for another reason: it represents the conviction that philosophy should let itself be guided by rhetoric, that the purpose of philosophy is therefore not so much to reveal the truth, but to encourage people to pursue the good. This perspective, so typical of Italian humanism, could easily lead to reducing all philosophy to ethics, in a move reminiscent of Plato's Socrates and of Cicero.

=== Method of philosophy ===
If, as mentioned above, scholasticism continued to flourish, the Italian humanists (i.e., lovers and practitioners of the humanities) challenged its supremacy. As we have seen, they believed that philosophy could be brought under the wing of rhetoric. They also thought that the scholarly discourse of their time needed to return to the elegance and precision of its classical models. They therefore tried dressing philosophy in a more appealing garb than had their predecessors, whose translations and commentaries were in technical Latin and sometimes simply transliterated the Greek. In 1416–1417, Leonardo Bruni, the pre-eminent humanist of his time and chancellor of Florence, re-translated Aristotle's Ethics into a more flowing, idiomatic and classical Latin. He hoped to communicate the elegance of Aristotle's Greek while also making the text more accessible to those without a philosophical education. Others, including Nicolò Tignosi in Florence around 1460, and the Frenchman Jacques Lefèvre d'Étaples in Paris in the 1490s, tried to please the humanists either by including in their commentaries on Aristotle appealing historical examples or quotations from poetry, or by avoiding the standard scholastic format of questions, or both.

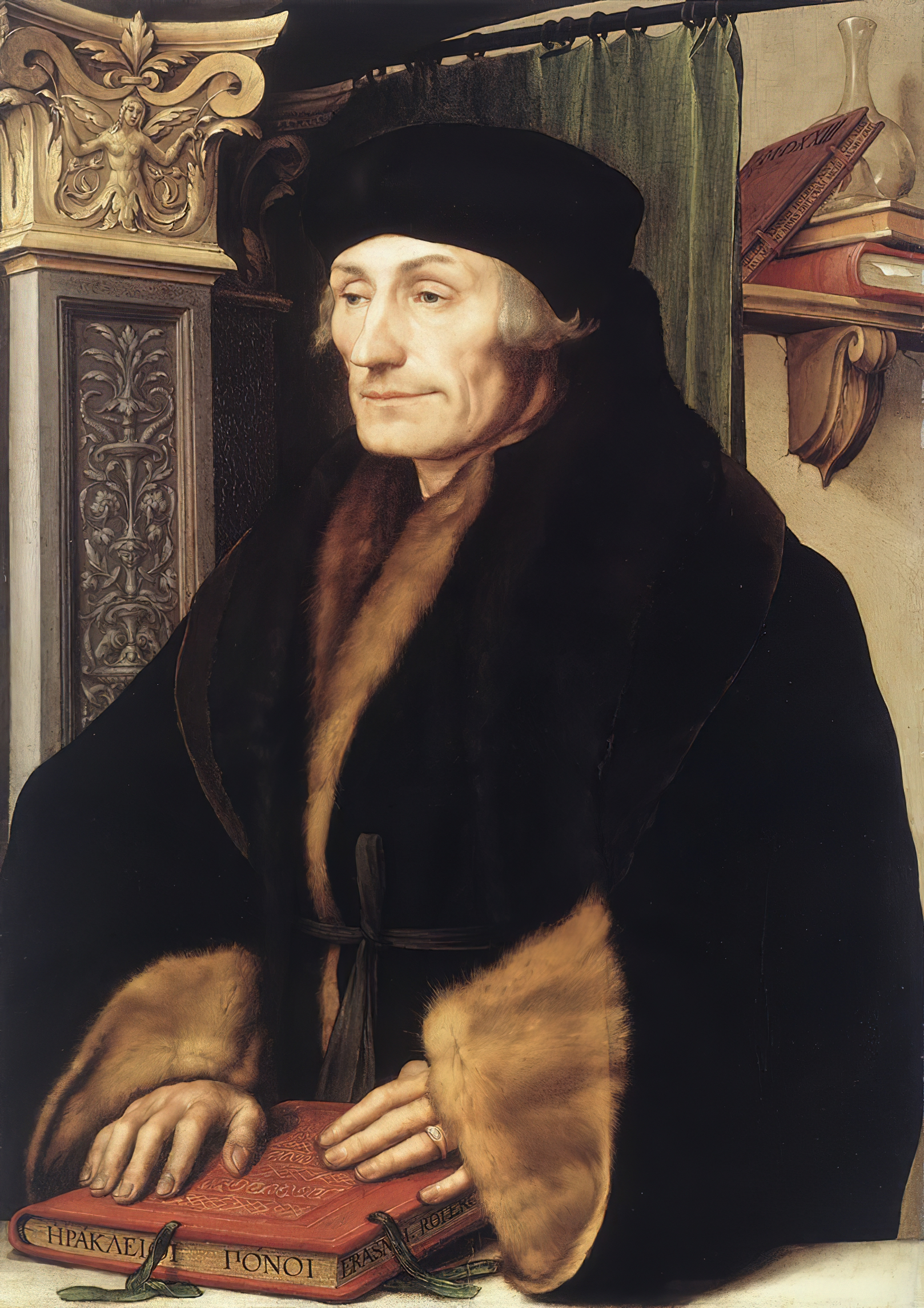
Portrait of Erasmus by Hans Holbein the Younger, 1523

The driving conviction was that philosophy should be freed of its technical jargon so that more people would be able to read it. At the same time, all kinds of summaries, paraphrases, and dialogues dealing with philosophical issues were prepared, in order to give their topics a wider dissemination. Humanists also encouraged the study of Aristotle and other writers of antiquity in the original. Desiderius Erasmus, the great Dutch humanist, even prepared a Greek edition of Aristotle, and eventually those teaching philosophy in the universities had to at least pretend that they knew Greek. Humanists were not, however, great fans of the vernacular. There is only a handful of examples of dialogues or translations of Aristotle's works into Italian during the fifteenth century. Once it had been determined, however, that Italian was a language with literary merit and that it could carry the weight of philosophical discussion, numerous efforts in this direction started to appear, particularly from the 1540s onward. Alessandro Piccolomini had a programme to translate or paraphrase the entire Aristotelian corpus into the vernacular.

Other important figures were Benedetto Varchi, Bernardo Segni and Giambattista Gelli, all of them active in Florence. Efforts got underway to present Plato's doctrines in the vernacular as well. This rise of vernacular philosophy, which quite predated the Cartesian approach, is a new field of research whose contours are only now beginning to be clarified.

=== Topics in philosophy ===
It is very hard to generalize about the ways in which discussions of philosophical topics shifted in the Renaissance, mainly because to do so requires a detailed map of the period, something we do not yet have. We know that debates about the freedom of the will continued to flare up (for instance, in the famous exchanges between Erasmus and Martin Luther), that Spanish thinkers were increasingly obsessed with the notion of nobility, that duelling was a practice that generated a large literature in the sixteenth century (was it permissible or not?).

Earlier histories gave perhaps undue attention to Pietro Pomponazzi's pronouncements on the immortality of the soul as a question that could not be resolved philosophically in a way consistent with Christianity, or to Pico della Mirandola's Oration on the Dignity of Man, as if these were signals of the period's increasing secularism or even atheism. In fact, the most successful compendium of natural philosophy in the period (Compendium philosophiae naturalis, first published in 1530) was authored by Frans Titelmans, a Franciscan friar from the Low Countries whose work has a very strong religious flavour. We must not forget that most philosophers of the time were at least nominal, if not devout, Christians, that the sixteenth century saw both the Protestant and the Catholic reformations, and that Renaissance philosophy culminates with the period of the Thirty Years' War (1618–1648). In other words, religion had a massive importance in the period, and one can hardly study philosophy without remembering this.

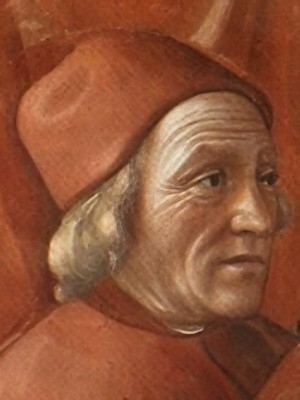
Marsilio Ficino, detail of Angel Appearing to Zacharias by Domenico Ghirlandaio, ca. 1490

This is true among others for the philosophy of Marsilio Ficino (1433–1499), who reinterpreted Plato in the light of his early Greek commentators and also of Christianity. Ficino hoped that a purified philosophy would bring about a religious renewal in his society and therefore transformed distasteful aspects of Platonic philosophy (for instance, the homosexual love exalted in the Symposium) into spiritual love (i.e., Platonic love), something later transformed by Pietro Bembo and Baldassare Castiglione in the early sixteenth century as something also applicable to relationships between men and women. Ficino and his followers also had an interest in 'hidden knowledge', mainly because of his belief that all of ancient knowledge was interconnected (Moses, for instance, had received his insights from the Greeks, who in turn had received them from others, all according to God's plan and therefore mutually consistent; Hermeticism is relevant here). Although Ficino's interest in and practice of astrology was not uncommon in his time, one should not necessarily associate it with philosophy, as the two were usually considered to be quite separate and often in contradiction with each other.

In conclusion, like any other moment in the history of thought Renaissance philosophy cannot be considered to have provided something entirely new nor to have continued for centuries to repeat the conclusions of its predecessors. Historians call this period the 'Renaissance' in order to indicate the rebirth that took place of ancient (particularly classical) perspectives, sources, attitudes toward literature and the arts. At the same time, we realize that every re-appropriation is constrained and even guided by contemporary concerns and biases. It was no different for the period considered here: the old was mixed with and changed by the new, but while no claims can be made for a revolutionary new starting point in philosophy, in many ways the synthesis of Christianity, Aristotelianism, and Platonism offered by Thomas Aquinas was torn apart in order to make way for a new one, based on more complete and varied sources, often in the original, and certainly attuned to new social and religious realities and a much broader public.

== Renaissance philosophers ==
- Coluccio Salutati (1331–1406)
- Gemistus Pletho (1355–1452)
- Leonardo Bruni (1370–1444)
- Nicholas of Cusa (1401–1464)
- Leon Battista Alberti (1404–1472)
- Lorenzo Valla (1407–1457)
- Marsilio Ficino (1433–1499)
- Antonio de Nebrija (1444–1522)
- Pietro Pomponazzi (1462–1524)
- Giovanni Pico della Mirandola (1463–1494)
- Erasmus of Rotterdam (1466–1536)
- Niccolò Machiavelli (1469–1527)
- Nicolaus Copernicus (1473–1543)
- Thomas More (1478–1535)
- Charles de Bovelles (1479–1553)
- Francesco Guicciardini (1483–1540)
- Francisco de Vitoria (1483–1546)
- Martin Luther (1490–1546)
- Martín de Azpilcueta (1492–1586)
- Domingo de Soto (1494–1560)
- Juan Ginés de Sepúlveda (1490–1573)
- Bernardino Telesio (1509–1588)
- Diego de Covarrubias y Leyva (1512–1577)
- Luis de León (1527–1591)
- Jean Bodin (1529–1596)
- Michel de Montaigne (1533–1592)
- Luis de Molina (1536–1600)
- Juan de Mariana (1536–1624)
- Tycho Brahe (1546–1601)
- Joest Lips (1547-1606)
- Giordano Bruno (1548–1600)
- Francisco Suárez (1548–1617)
- Gabriel Vásquez (1549 or 1551–1604)
- Tommaso Campanella (1568–1639)
- Giulio Cesare Vanini (1585–1619)

== See also ==
- Age of Enlightenment
- Hermeticism
- Renaissance humanism
- Renaissance magic
- Platonism in the Renaissance
- Second scholasticism

== Bibliography ==
- Copenhaver, Brian P., & Schmitt, Charles B., Renaissance Philosophy, New York: Oxford University Press, 1992.
- Hankins, James, (ed.), The Cambridge Companion to Renaissance Philosophy, Cambridge: Cambridge University Press, 2007.
- Riedl, John O., A Catalogue of Renaissance Philosophers (1350–1650), Milwaukee: Marquette University Press, 1940.
- Schmitt, Charles B., Skinner, Quentin (eds.), The Cambridge History of Renaissance Philosophy, Cambridge: Cambridge University Press, 1988.
