= Vallius =

Vallius is a surname. Notable people with the surname include:

- Paavo Vallius (born 1949), Swedish politician
- Paulus Vallius (1561–1622), Italian logician
