= Platonism in the Renaissance =

Platonism, especially in its Neoplatonist form, underwent a revival in the Renaissance as part of a general revival of interest in classical antiquity. Interest in Platonism was especially strong in Florence under the Medici.

== History ==
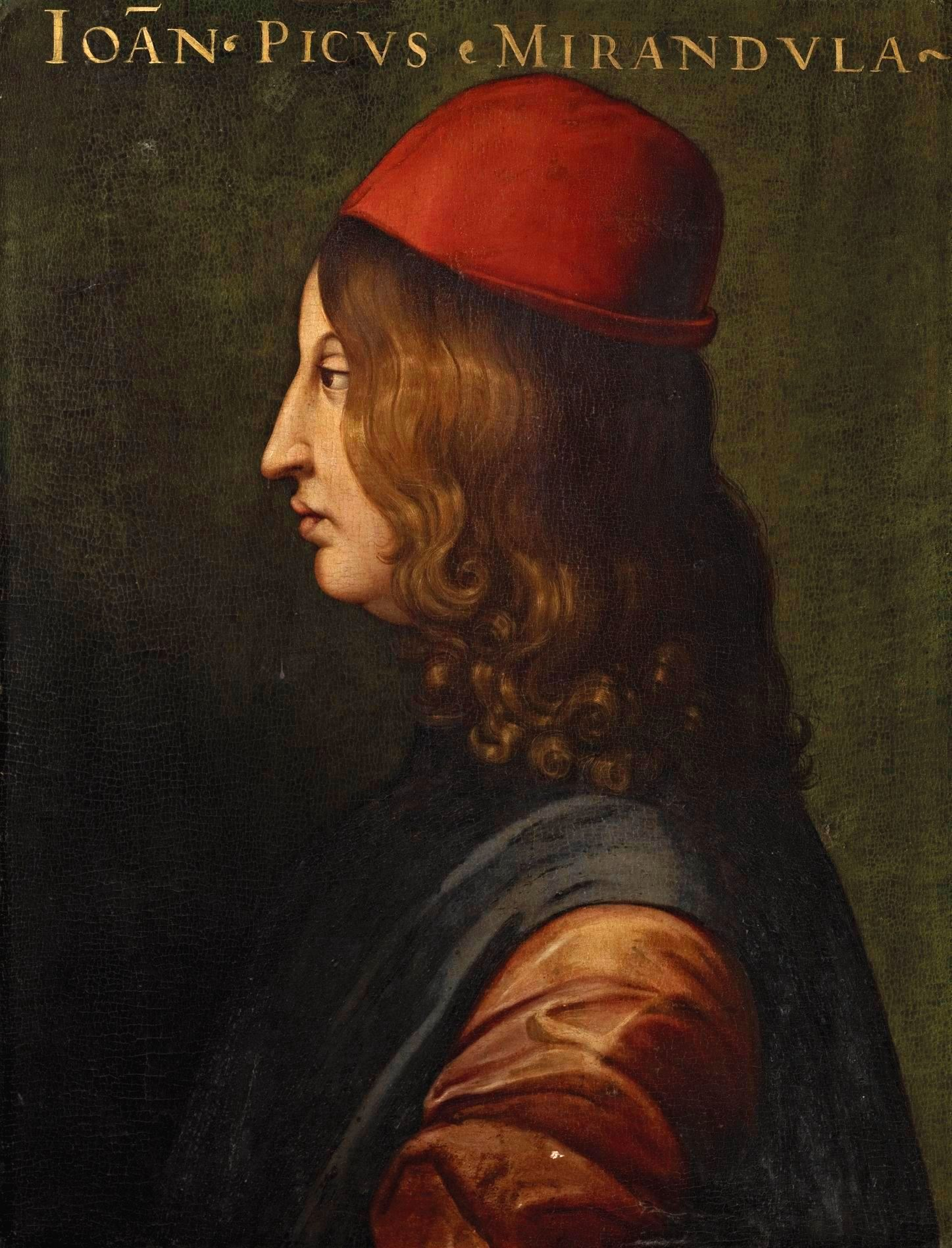
Giovanni Pico della Mirandola

During the sessions at Florence of the Council of Ferrara-Florence in 1438–1445, during the failed attempts to heal the schism of the Orthodox and Catholic churches, Cosimo de' Medici and his intellectual circle had made acquaintance with the Neoplatonic philosopher, George Gemistos Plethon, whose discourses upon Plato and the Alexandrian mystics so fascinated the learned society of Florence that they named him the second Plato.

In 1459, John Argyropoulos was lecturing on Greek language and literature at Florence, and Marsilio Ficino became his pupil. When Cosimo decided to refound Plato's Academy at Florence, his choice to head it was Ficino, who made the classic translation of Plato from Greek to Latin (published in 1484), as well as a translation of a collection of Hellenistic Greek documents of the Hermetic Corpus, and the writings of many of the Neoplatonists, for example, Porphyry, Iamblichus, Plotinus, and others. Following suggestions laid out by Gemistos Plethon, Ficino tried to synthesize Christianity and Platonism.

Ficino's student, Giovanni Pico della Mirandola, also based his ideas chiefly on Plato, but Pico retained a deep respect for Aristotle. Although he was a product of the studia humanitatis, Pico was constitutionally an eclectic, and in some respects he represented a reaction against the exaggerations of pure humanism, defending what he believed to be the best of the medieval and Islamic commentators (see Averroes, Avicenna) on Aristotle in a famous long letter to Ermolao Barbaro in 1485. It was always Pico's aim to reconcile the schools of Plato and Aristotle, since he believed they both used different words to express the same concepts.

It was perhaps for this reason that his friends called him Princeps Concordiae ("Prince of Harmony"), a punning allusion to Concordia, one of his family's holdings. Similarly, Pico believed that an educated person also should study the Hebrew and Talmudic sources, and the Hermetics, because he believed they represented the same view seen in the Old Testament, in different words, of God.

The writings attributed to Hermes Trismegistus had played an important role in the Renaissance Neoplatonic revival.

== See also ==
- Allegorical interpretations of Plato
- Cambridge Platonists
- Platonic Academy (Florence)
- List of Renaissance commentators on Aristotle
- Ancient Egypt in the Western imagination
