= Gaetano da Thiene =

Gaetano da Thiene may refer to:

- Gaetano da Thiene (philosopher) (1387–1465), Renaissance philosopher and physician
- Saint Cajetan (1480–1547), Catholic saint and the founder of the order of the Clerics Regular, better known as the Theatines
