= Bartolomé Ramos de Pareja =

Spanish mathematician and music theorist

Bartolomé Ramos de Pareja (ca. 1440 – after 1490), also spelled Bartolomeo Ramis de Pareia, was a Spanish mathematician, music theorist, and composer. His only surviving works are a single canon the Latin treatise Musica practica.

== Life ==
By his own testimony at the end of his Musica practica, Ramos de Pareja was born in Baeza, possibly around 1440. Most of the biographical details of his life must be culled from this treatise. He says that he was a student of Juan de Monte and that he obtained the chair of music at the University of Salamanca for his commentaries on the works of Boethius (cum Boetium in musica legeremus), though his position may have been unofficial. At Salamanca he had many debates with Pedro de Osma concerning his musical theories. He moved to Italy in the 1470s, likely due to his treatment by the university. His residence in Bologna was the best recorded period of his life. Here he lectured publicly outside of the University of Bologna, taught private students, including Giovanni Spataro, a notable Italian composer, and published his Musica practica in 1482. In 1484, due to the university's neglect, he left for Rome, where he lived until his death. He was last documented in Rome in 1491.

It is not known whether Ramos de Pareja died in 1491 or continued living in Rome. The first documented news of his death is by his pupil Giovanni Spataro in 1521. François-Joseph Fétis assumes that this means Pareja died in 1521, as he believes Spataro would've wrote about his teacher's death sooner. However, another source from 1521 describes Pareja as having "long been dead", though it is not known whether this is meant figuratively or literally.

== Theory ==
In his Musica, he revolutionarily proposed a new, five-limit division of the monochord, breaking from the Pythagorean system that had dominated the medieval ars antiqua through Boethius and Guido of Arezzo. This system of musical tuning yielded consonant perfect fourths and fifths, but the thirds and sixths were rough. Ramos de Pareja's new division was only slowly accepted. Afterwards he worked in Italy, primarily at Bologna, where his theories engendered serious controversy, even polemics, from conservatives such as Franchino Gaffurio. After a long stay there he moved to Rome, where he died shortly after 1521.

Ramos de Pareja sought to heal the divide between music in theory and in practice. To this end he sought to render the dissonant thirds and sixths consonant. He proposed the intervals 5/4, 6/5, 5/3, and 8/5 for the division of the monochord, subsequently accepted universally. Less successful was his attempt to replace hexachordal notation with a system of eight syllables denoting the eight sounds of a diatonic scale: psal-li-tur-per-vo-ces-is-tas. Ramos has been described as "the first modern tuning reformer who produced a workable system".

The Musica practica also contains interesting commentary on mensural notation, chromatic alterations, examples of counterpoint, musical instruments, and the division of music and its effects. Ramos de Pareja was the first theorist to label the method now known as the Guidonian hand the manus Guidonis; prior to him it was called the manus musicalis. He chose the title Musica practica to emphasise the practical rather than the theoretical/mathematical component of music. Throughout Ramos de Pareja alludes to his own compositions, though few survive.

== Music ==
=== Canons ===
- Mundus et Musica, canon perpetuum
