= List of Renaissance humanists =

The following is a list of Renaissance humanists, individuals whose careers threw light on the movement as a whole.

== List ==
- Barlaam of Seminara (c. 1290-1348) (Italian)
- Leontius Pilatus (?-1364/1366) (Greek)
- Francesco Petrarca (1304-1374) (Italian)
- Giovanni Boccaccio (1313–1375) (Italian)
- Simon Atumano (?-c.1380) (Greco-Turkish)
- Francesc Eiximenis (c. 1330–1409) (Catalan)
- Coluccio Salutati (1331–1406) (Italian)
- Geert Groote (1340–1384) (Dutch)
- Bernat Metge (c.1340–1413) (Catalan)
- Manuel Chrysoloras (c.1355–1415) (Greek)
- George Gemistos Plethon (c.1355–1452/1454) (Greek)
- Niccolò de' Niccoli (1364–1437) (Italian)
- Leonardo Bruni (c.1369–1444) (Italian)
- Guarino da Verona (1370–1460) (Italian)
- Vittorino da Feltre (1378–1446) (Italian)
- Poggio Bracciolini (1380–1459) (Italian)
- Cosimo de' Medici (1389–1464) (Italian)
- Tommaso Parentucelli (Pope Nicholas V) (1391–1455) (Italian)
- Peter, Duke of Coimbra (1392–1449) (Portuguese)
- Flavio Biondo (1392–1463) (Italian)
- Antonio Beccadelli (1394–1471) (Italian)
- George of Trebizond (1395–1486) (Greek)
- Giannozzo Manetti (1396–1459) (Italian)
- Francesco Filelfo (1398–1481) (Italian)
- Carlo Marsuppini (1399–1453) (Italian)
- Íñigo López de Mendoza, marqués de Santillana (1398–1458) (Castilian)
- Gjon Gazulli (1400–1465) (Albanian)
- Theodorus Gaza (c.1400–1475) (Greek)
- Nicholas of Cusa (1401–1469) (German)
- Bessarion (1403–1472) (Greek)
- Gregory of Sanok (1403/07–1477) (Polish)
- Aeneas Sylvius Piccolomini (Pope Pius II) (1405–1464) (Italian)
- John Vitéz (1408–1472) (Croatian/Hungarian)
- Bartolomeo Facio (1410–1457) (Italian/Neapolitan)
- Isotta Nogarola (1418-1466) (Italian)
- Wessel Gansfort (1419-1489) (Frisian)
- Bartolomeo Platina (1421–1481) (Italian/Roman)
- Vespasiano da Bisticci (1421–1498) (Italian)
- Giovanni Pontano (1426–1503) (Italian/Neapolitan)
- Julius Pomponius Laetus (1428–1498) (Italian/Roman)
- Niccolò Perotti (1429–1480) (Italian)
- Marsilio Ficino (1433–1499) (Italian/Florentine)
- Janus Pannonius (1434–1472) (Hungarian/Croatian)
- John Doget (c.1434–1501) (English)
- Antonio Bonfini (1434–1503) (Italian)
- Stefano Infessura (c.1435-c.1500) (Italian)
- Francisco Jiménez de Cisneros (1436–1517) (Spanish)
- Filippo Buonaccorsi (1437–1496) (Italian/ Tuscan)
- Giovanni Michele Alberto da Carrara (1438–1490) (Italian)
- Antonio de Nebrija (1441–1522) (Spanish)
- Martin Segon (?–1482/85) (Serbian)
- Rodolphus Agricola (1443–1485) (Frisian)
- Lucio Marineo Siculo (1444–1533) (Italian)
- Janus Lascaris (c.1445–1535) (Greek)
- Juraj Šižgorić (1445–1509) (Croatian)
- William Grocyn (c.1446–1519) (English)
- Aldus Manutius (1449–1515) (Italian/Venetian)
- Yuriy Drohobych (1450-1494) (Ukrainian)
- Marko Marulić (1450-1524) (Croatian)
- Marin Barleti (c.1450–c.1512/13) (Albanian/Venetian)
- Johannes Stöffler (1452–1531) (German)
- Angelo Poliziano (1454-1494) (Italian/Florentine)
- Johann Reuchlin (1455–1522) (German)
- Paulus Aemilius Veronensis (1455–1529) (Italian/Venetian)
- Jacques Lefèvre d'Étaples (1455–1536) (French)
- Nicholas Leonicus Thomaeus (1456–1531) (Albanian or Greek)
- Peter Martyr d'Anghiera (1457–1526) (Italian)
- Jacopo Sannazaro (1458–1530) (Italian)
- Conrad Celtes (1459–1508) (German)
- Džore Držić (1461–1501) (Croatian)
- Johannes Trithemius (1462–1516) (German)
- Giovanni Pico della Mirandola (1463–1494) (Italian)
- Cassandra Fedele (1465-1558) (Italian)
- Hector Boece (1465–1536) (Scottish)
- Laurentius Corvinus (1465–1527) (Silesian)
- Desiderius Erasmus (1466–1536) (Dutch)
- Marinus Becichemus Scodrensis (1468–1526) (Albanian)
- Niccolò Machiavelli (1469–1527) (Italian/Florentine)
- Laura Cereta (1469-1499) (Italian)
- Aires de Figueiredo Barbosa (1470–1540) (Portuguese)
- Janus Parrhasius (1470–1522) (Italian)
- Pietro Bembo (1470–1547) (Italian)
- Polydore Vergil (1470–1555) (Italian/English)
- Ludovico Ariosto (1474–1533) (Italian)
- Alessandra Scala (1475-1506)(Italian)
- Thomas More (1478–1535) (English)
- Baldassare Castiglione (1478–1529) (Italian)
- Raphael Sanzio (1483–1520) (Italian)
- Bartolomé de las Casas (1484–1566) (Spanish)
- Beatus Rhenanus (1485–1547) (German)
- Pieter Gillis (1486–1533) (Flemish)
- Sigismund von Herberstein (1486–1566) (Austrian/Slovene)
- Macropedius (1487–1558) (Dutch)
- Pietro Alcionio (c.1487–1527) (Italian)
- William Farel (1489–1565) (French/Swiss)
- Alfonso de Valdés (1490–1532) (Spanish)
- Joan Boscà i Almogàver (c.1490?–1542) (Catalan)
- Pietro Aretino (1492–1556) (Italian/Tuscan)
- Joan Lluís Vives i March (1492–1540) (Valencian)
- François Rabelais (c.1494–1553) (French)
- Juan Ginés de Sepúlveda (1494-1573) (Spanish)
- Philipp Melanchthon (1497–1560) (German)
- Pier Paolo Vergerio (1498–1565) (Italian)
- André de Resende (1498–1573) (Portuguese)
- Janus Cornarius (1500–1558) (German)
- Damião de Góis (1502–1574) (Portuguese)
- Giovanni della Casa (1503–1556) (Italian)
- George Buchanan (1506–1582) (Scottish)
- Arnoldus Arlenius (c.1510–1582) (Dutch)
- Michael Servetus (1511–1553) (Spanish)
- Francesco Robortello (1516–1567) (Italian)
- Johannes Goropius Becanus (1519–1572) (Dutch)
- Giovanni Valentino Gentile (c. 1520-1566) (Italian)
- Łukasz Górnicki (1527-1603) (Polish)
- Étienne de La Boétie (1530–1563) (French)
- Giovan Battista Pigna (1530-1575) Italian poet, court historian, and author of military works
- Michel de Montaigne (1533–1592) (French)
- Paul Skalich (1534–1573) (Croatian)
- Alphonsus Ciacconius (1540–1599) (Spanish)
- Justus Lipsius (1547–1606) (Flemish)
- Giordano Bruno (1548–1600) (Italian)
- Fausto Veranzio (1551–1617) (Croatian)
- Ignazio Cardini (1566–1602) (Corsican/Italian)
- Thomas Reid (?–1624) (Scottish)
- David Hume of Godscroft (1558–1629) (Scottish)
- Gian Vittorio Rossi (1577–1647) Italian poet, philologist, and historian.

== See also ==
- List of Renaissance commentators on Aristotle
- Greek scholars in the Renaissance
