= Pietro Pomponazzi =

Italian philosopher (1462–1525)

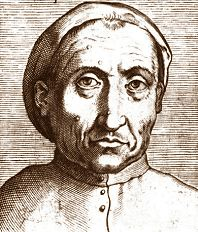
- Born: 16 September 1462; Mantua, Margravate of Mantua
- Died: 18 May 1525 (aged 62); Bologna, Papal States

Education
- Education: University of Padua
- Academic advisor: Nicoletto Vernia

Philosophical work
- Era: Renaissance
- Region: Western philosophy
- School: Aristotelianism
- Institutions: University of Padua; University of Ferrara; University of Bologna
- Notable students: Gaspare Contarini, Andrea Mocenigo, Domenico Grimani, Marcantonio Zimara, Lazzaro Bonamico, Paolo Giovio
- Main interests: Philosophy of mind, Natural philosophy, Ethics, Aristotelianism
- Notable works: Tractatus de immortalitate animae (Treatise on the Immortality of the Soul); De naturalium effectuum causis sive de incantationibus (On the Causes of Marvelous Natural Effects or On Incantations)
- Notable ideas: Mortalist interpretation of the soul, naturalism, separation of philosophy and theology

Pietro Pomponazzi (16 September 1462 – 18 May 1525) was an Italian philosopher. He is sometimes known by his Latin name, Petrus Pomponatius.

== Biography ==
Pietro Pomponazzi was born in Mantua on 16 September 1462 into a wealthy family with long-standing links to the House of Gonzaga. In January 1484, he enrolled at the University of Padua, obtained his doctorate in arts in 1487 and the following year began teaching as an extraordinary professor of philosophy. During his time in Padua, he studied metaphysics with Francesco Securo da Nardò and possibly Antonio Trombetta, natural philosophy with Nicoletto Vernia and Pietro Trapolino, and medicine with Pietro Roccabonella, who emphasised the interconnectedness of body and soul in the healing process.

In 1488 Pomponazzi was appointed as an extraordinary professor of philosophy at the University of Padua, where he taught alongside his former teacher and later rival, the Averroist Alessandro Achillini. By 1492 he had been promoted to an ordinary professor secundo loco and, in 1495, primo loco. Shortly thereafter, around early 1496, he received his medical doctorate, a standard step for those advancing in Northern Italian academia, as philosophical studies were often a prerequisite for the medical curriculum. After eight years of teaching at Padua, he resigned in 1496 to serve as a tutor in logic to Alberto III Pio, lord of Carpi. He later accompanied Alberto Pio into exile in Ferrara.

In 1499 Pomponazzi returned to the University of Padua to take up the chair of natural philosophy, succeeding his late teacher, the Averroist Nicoletto Vernia. He held this position until 1509, when teaching was suspended in Padua after the Republic of Venice recaptured the city from the League of Cambrai. Invited by Alfonso I d'Este, Pomponazzi briefly taught at the University of Ferrara before moving to Bologna in 1511, where he produced all his major works and remained until his death. During the siege of the city in 1512 – part of the War of the League of Cambrai – he temporarily suspended lectures "propter Hispanos" (because of the Spaniards) before resuming them later that year.

In 1514, Pomponazzi was accused of heresy due to the unguarded statements he had made during his lectures. In 1516, he published his major work, the De immortalitate animae (On the immortality of the soul), in which he put forward a mortalist interpretation of Aristotle's On the Soul, arguing that the human soul is entirely dependent on the body and is thus destroyed with it. Three years earlier, the Fifth Lateran Council had approved the papal bull Apostolici regiminis, reaffirming the Thomist doctrine of the soul's immortality and requiring professors to uphold it. The De immortalitate appeared to contradict this and therefore caused intense controversy. In 1517, Bishop Ambrogio Fiandino denounced the treatise from the pulpit in Mantua. In Venice, Dominican friars denounced Pomponazzi for heresy to Patriarch Antonio Contarini, a former student of his. Contarini condemned the work, and the Senate approved this condemnation by ordering the book's public burning and banning its sale. However, thanks to the protection of the influential Papal Secretary Pietro Bembo, Pomponazzi was never tried as a heretic or forced to recant. On 13 June 1518, Pope Leo X admonished him to conform to the bull Apostolici regiminis and to retract his statements, but the warning was revoked and the process cancelled due to Bembo's intervention. Despite the controversy, in December 1518 the University of Bologna confirmed him in his position, offering improved pay, exemption from a concurrens (competitor), and the privilege of choosing his own texts.

Pomponazzi defended his position on Aristotle and the mortality of the soul in the Apologia (1518), in response to objections made by Gaspare Contarini and other philosophers. He also wrote the Defensorium (1519), in reply to Agostino Nifo's De immortalitate animae adversus Pomponatium, which was published in Venice in October 1518. The Defensorium was only authorised for publication on the condition that it included a formal refutation of the arguments for the mortality of the soul, written by the Dominican theologian Crisostomo Javelli. Pomponazzi clarified that, as a philosopher arguing in naturalibus (based on natural philosophy), he interpreted Aristotle as implying the mortality of the soul, whereas as a Christian, he affirmed the doctrine of immortality.

Pomponazzi completed his last two major treatises, the De incantationibus (On incantations) and the De fato, de libero arbitrio, et de praedestinatione (On fate, free will, and predestination), in 1520. Both were published posthumously in Basel, possibly because Pomponazzi feared they might inflame the controversy surrounding the De immortalitate animae. His final work published during his lifetime was De nutritione et augmentatione (On nutrition and growth), which appeared in 1521.

Pomponazzi's health declined in 1524. On 20 May 1524 he dictated his will. According to a witness to his final days, he was in great suffering, refused food and, on his last night, said that he was departing happily "where all mortals go". He died in Bologna on 18 May 1525, and his remains were transferred to Mantua for burial in the Church of San Francesco. He was commemorated by a monument commissioned by Cardinal Ercole Gonzaga, his former pupil.

Pomponazzi was married three times. On 14 December 1500, he married Cornelia Dondi dall'Orologio, with whom he had two daughters, Lucia and Ippolita. After being widowed in 1504, he remarried in 1507 to Ludovica di Pietro da Montagnana, who died in 1511. Shortly before the spring of 1515, he married his third wife, Adriana della Scrofa, who outlived him.

== Philosophy and writings ==
=== Soul, immortality and ethics ===
Published in 1516, De immortalitate animae is the work upon which Pomponazzi's fame chiefly rests. The treatise addresses one of the most crucial debates in Renaissance Aristotelianism – the nature and destiny of the human soul as conceived in Aristotle's philosophy. Pomponazzi aimed to examine the question of the soul's immortality relying solely on reason and experience in order to ascertain Aristotle's true meaning without invoking "anything from faith or revelation".

Pomponazzi wrote at a time when scholastic formalism was losing its hold both inside and outside the Church. Since the 13th century, Christian doctrine had been closely linked to Thomas Aquinas's the interpretation of Aristotle, and any attempt to reopen the discussion on Aristotelian issues was viewed with suspicion as possible heresy. Pomponazzi, however, asserted the philosopher's right to interpret Aristotle independently, and in the De immortalitate animae he argued that Aquinas had misunderstood Aristotle's distinction between active and passive intellect. At the same time, Pomponazzi took a stand against the Averroist school. Averroes and his Christian followers had argued that the active intellect – the separate and universal power that actualises human understanding – is unique and immortal for all humankind (a doctrine known as monopsychism), interpreting immortality as a mystical absorption into a universal divine intellect rather than as personal survival. Rejecting both the Thomist and Averroist interpretations, Pomponazzi followed Alexander of Aphrodisias in maintaining that intellectual activity depends entirely on the bodily senses and imagination, and that a purely separate intellect is inconceivable. As the form of a corporeal substance, the human soul cannot exist apart from the body; body and soul perish together.

This conclusion brought Pomponazzi into open conflict with Christian orthodoxy. In order to avoid censure, he carefully distinguished between the domains of philosophy and faith. He insisted that his arguments were based exclusively on natural reason, and that he accepted the opposite conclusion – the immortality of the soul – as an article of faith according to the authority of the Church. In his view, the problem of immortality was a "neutral question" that could not be resolved by reason or natural philosophy and must therefore be left to revelation.

Even more significant than this cautious disclaimer were the ethical implications that Pomponazzi drew from his philosophy. He argued that denying personal immortality did not necessarily destroy the foundations of morality, and that virtue did not require any hope of reward or fear of punishment beyond the grave: "the essential reward of virtue is virtue itself, which makes a person happy". Whether the soul is mortal or immortal, the moral criterion remains unchanged: one must never stray from virtue, regardless of what may follow death. This idea, expressed in the Greek phrase τοῦ καλοῦ ἕνεκα ("for the sake of the good"), marks a clear departure from the moral theology of his time.

According to Guido Calogero, Pomponazzi's conception of virtue as self-sufficient foreshadows the later ethical philosophies of Spinoza and Kant. In this regard, Pomponazzi emerges as a representative figure of the Renaissance, embodying the transition from scholastic dogmatism to an independent, human-centred rational enquiry. Despite the materialistic implications of his conclusions, he professed his adherence to the Catholic faith, thus establishing the principle that religion and philosophy, faith and knowledge, can coexist in tension within the same thinker.

=== Nature, miracles, and religion ===
Pomponazzi's distinction between faith and reason reappears in his later work, De naturalium effectuum admirandorum causis sive de incantationibus (1520), also known as De incantatione. Here, he examined the alleged actions of demons and spirits through the lens of natural reason, concluding that they cannot operate within the natural order, even though he professed to believe in them as a Christian.

Applying his naturalistic philosophy to the realm of the preternatural, Pomponazzi maintained that the visible world follows a fixed and intelligible natural order. Consequently, all wonders should be explained by natural principles rather than demonic or supernatural intervention. Even if demons existed, he argued, they could neither know nor influence individual things, since every wonder could be traced to natural causes – manifest or occult qualities, vapors, or astral influences. Drawing examples from medicine and natural history – such as magnets, the torpedo fish's electric shock, and the remora's reputed supernatural power to halt ships – he illustrated his theory of hidden powers and imaginative causation. Many scriptural miracles may be "superficially reduced to natural causes", though others, like the resurrection of Lazarus, remain true miracles.

The De incantatione also presents a natural history of religion. Pomponazzi holds that lawgivers employ moral fables – "neither true nor false" – to instill virtue among the people, and that religions themselves rise and decline in accordance with celestial cycles and divine providence. He extends this cyclical view to "our own faith", noting the waning of miracles in Christianity. Ultimately, the entire cosmic order, including human institutions and religion, derives from divine power, and serves the moral purpose of guiding humanity toward virtue.

Pomponazzi ended the treatise by submitting it to the judgment of the Church; nevertheless, it was placed on the Index Librorum Prohibitorum by the 1570s.

Also the De nutritione et augmentatione (1521), dedicated to Cardinal Domenico Grimani, gives a naturalistic account of growth and nutrition, reaffirming that the operations of the intellect depend on the body and its organs, and proposing natural explanations for reputed miracles. His later Bologna lectures on De generatione et corruptione, De partibus animalium, and Meteorologica continued this naturalism, combining skepticism about complete human knowledge with discussion of prodigies and stellar causation.

=== Fate, free will and providence ===
In his Libri quinque de fato, de libero arbitrio et de praedestinatione (1520), also known as De fato, Pomponazzi argued that Aristotelian philosophy was incompatible not only with the immortality of the soul but also with the notion of free will. In this treatise he developed a deterministic account of the natural order, influenced by Stoic philosophy: God acts through the celestial spheres, and every sublunary event necessarily follows from higher causes. Contingency, therefore, is merely the product of human ignorance of this chain of necessity, and human will, conditioned by temperament and circumstance, is not entirely free. To preserve the notions of divine providence, omnipotence and omniscience, Pomponazzi favoured fate over human liberty, conceiving destiny in the first books of the De fato as the universal order established by God. However, in the later books he sought to reconcile philosophical determinism with Christian doctrine. He suggested that God voluntarily limits his foreknowledge in order to allow a form of conditional liberty, and he redefined predestination as a grace granted to the elect, which can be forfeited through sin. In the epilogue to the De fato, Pomponazzi evoked a Stoic image of the cosmos as a perfectly ordered living whole while once again professing submission to the authority of the Church.

Pomponazzi signed the De incantationibus on 16 August 1520 and the De fato on 25 November of the same year. Both works circulated in manuscript form before being printed at Basel in 1556 and 1567 by Guglielmo Gratarolo, a Calvinist who had been exiled from Bergamo. Some of their propositions were later condemned and the De fato was placed on the Index Librorum Prohibitorum in 1576.

== Reception and legacy ==
Pomponazzi's writings provoked accusations of heterodoxy and Protestant leanings, as well as of supporting atheism. However, they also earned him admiration for his intellectual independence, his fidelity to Aristotle, and his role in paving the way for materialism and modern science.

Critics such as Ambrogio Flandino drew parallels between the theories set out in De fato and the denial of free will by Luther and Jan Hus. This association was further reinforced by the publication of his later works in Bern by a Calvinist exile, as well as by his recognised influence on Giulio Cesare Vanini, who was executed as a heretic. Tommaso Campanella, François Garasse, Marin Mersenne, among others, portrayed Pomponazzi as sympathetic to atheism and associated his thought with Niccolò Machiavelli's view of religion as an instrument of politics. instrumental view of religion as a political tool.

Yet Pomponazzi also had his defenders. Gabriel Naudé praised his wit and rigorous interpretation of Aristotle, thereby contributing to the association of Pomponazzi with 17th-century libertinism. His influence persisted through figures such as 16th-century Simone Porzio, who adopted his mortalist reading of the intellect, and 17th-century Pierre Bayle, who absolved him of impiety and commended his moral teachings based on virtue rather than reward.

In the nineteenth century, Ernest Renan and Roberto Ardigò regarded Pomponazzi as a precursor of the modern scientific spirit opposed to religious obscurantism. In the twentieth-century, interpretations of Pomponazzi divided between those who considered him to be either an insincere sceptic or a hidden enemy of Christianity, and those who, like Paul Oskar Kristeller, considered him to be part of the secular tradition of medieval philosophical thought that supported the independence of reason from theology.

== Works ==
- 1514. Tractatus utilissimus in quo disputatur penes quid intensio et remissio formarum (On the intension and remission of forms), Bologna; reprinted in Tractatus acutissimi.
- 1515. Tractatus de reactione (On reaction), Bologna; reprinted in Tractatus acutissimi, 1525.
- 1516. Tractatus de immortalitate animae (Treatise on the immortality of the soul), Bologna; reprinted in Tractatus acutissimi, 1525.
  - On the Immortality of the Soul, translated (English) by William Henry Hay II and John Herman Randall Jr., in The Renaissance Philosophy of Man, edited by Ernst Cassirer, Paul Oskar Kristeller, and John Herman Randall Jr., Chicago: University of Chicago Press, 1948.
  - Abhandlung über die Unsterblichkeit der Seele, edited and translated (German) by Burkhard Mojsisch, Hamburg: Meiner, 1990.
  - Trattato sull'immortalità dell'anima, translated (Italian) by Vittoria Perrone Compagni, Florence: Olschki, 1999.
  - Traité de l'immortalité de l'âme. Tractatus de immortalitate animae, edited and translated (French) by Thierry Gontier, Paris: Les Belle Lettres, 2012.
- 1518. Apologia (Apology), Bologna; reprinted in Tractatus acutissimi, 1525.
  - Apologia, translated (Italian) by Vittoria Perrone Compagni, Florence: Olschki, 2011.
- 1519. Defensorium (Defense), Bologna; reprinted in Tractatus acutissimi, 1525.
- 1521. Tractatus de nutritione et augmentatione (On growth and nutrition), Bologna; reprinted in Tractatus acutissimi, 1525.
- 1525. Tractatus acutissimi, utillimi et mere peripatetici, Venice.
  - Tutti i trattati peripatetici, edited and translated (Italian) by Francesco Paolo Raimondi and José Manuel García Valverde, Milan: Bompiani, 2013.
- 1556. De naturalium effectuum causis sive de incantationibus (On the causes of marvelous natural effects or on incantations), Basel; in Opera, 1567.
  - De incantationibus, edited by Vittoria Perrone Compagni, Florence: Olschki, 2011.
  - Les causes des merveilles de la nature, ou Les enchantements, translated (French) by Henri Busson, Paris: Rieder, 1930 (partial).
  - Gli incantesimi, translated (Italian) by Cristiana Innocenti, Florence: La Nuova Italia, 1997.
- 1563. Dubitationes in quartum Meteorologicorum Aristotelis librum (Doubts on meteorologica IV), Venice.
- 1567. De fato, libero arbitrio, praedestinatione, providentia Dei libri V (On fate, free will, predestination); in Opera, 1567.
  - Libri quinque de fato, libero arbitrio et praedestinatione, edited by Richard Lemany, Lugano: Thesaurus Mundi, 1957.
  - Il fato, il libero arbitrio e la predestinazione, translated (Italian) by Vittoria Perrone Compagni, Turin: Nino Aragno, 2004.
- 1966–1970. Corsi inediti dell'insegnamento padovano, 2 volumes, edited by Antonino Poppi, Padua: Antenore, volume 1 (1966), volume 2 (1970).
- 2004. Expositio super primo et secundo de partibus animalium, edited by Stefano Perfetti, Florence: Olschki.
- 2018. Expositio super I De anima Aristotelis et Commentatoris 1503 riportata da Antonio Surian, edited by Massimiliano Chianese, Rome: Storia e Letteratura.
