= Livre de Politiques =

Translation by Nicole Oresme

The Livre de Politiques (commonly shortened to Politiques) is an extensively annotated Middle-French translation of Aristotle's Politics by 14th-century scientist and philosopher Nicole Oresme. It is the first extant translation of the Politics into a modern vernacular language.

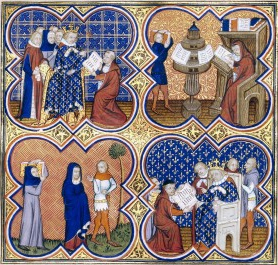
Miniature from the prologue of Aristote's Politics, Economics and Ethics (Bibliothèque nationale de France (BnF), Departement of manuscripts, RC-A-28551). 1st medallion: Charles V of France orders Oresme to translate the book. 2nd medallion: Translation by a canon (priest). 3rd medallion: Return to the king to present the translation. Accompanied by a bailiff and a clerc carrying the translation. 4th medallion: presentation of the book to Charles V.

== Historical background ==
There is no evidence for the reception or translation of Aristotle's Politics by Arabic philosophers during the Islamic Golden Age. It was introduced to the Latin West by William of Moerbeke's Latin translation from the Greek original in the 1260s. Soon after the translation was finished, Albert the Great and Thomas Aquinas wrote commentaries on it, trying to illuminate its sometimes obscure meaning and to reconcile it with Christian doctrine. Thomas' unfinished commentary was continued by Peter of Auvergne. The first known French translation of the Politics by Pierre de Paris is lost.

Before starting work on his own translation, Oresme was already a distinguished academic. Having probably studied the artes liberales with Jean Buridan at the University of Paris, he was admitted into the Collège de Navarre at the same university in 1348. In 1356, he acquired a master's degree in theology and become grand-maître of the Collège, before receiving a doctorate in theology in 1362. While studying and teaching there, he had contacts with Pierre Bersuire, Jean de Muris, Philippe de Vitry, and Guillaume Machaut. It is unclear whether Oresme was officially commissioned to come up with a solution for the financial crisis of the French monarchy in the 1350s, or whether he gained the royal family's attention by presenting said solution of his own accord. In 1355, he published his Tractatus de mutatione monetarum, followed a year later by a French translation (known as the Traictié de la Monnoie). In this work, he used Aristotelian thought to promote an end to the constant debasement of coinage practiced by King John II to pay for the Hundred Years' War.

In the turmoil following John II's capture at the Battle of Poitiers, Oresme appears to have supported the dauphin and newly appointed regent in the absence of the king, Charles (later King Charles V). Charles' and his father's right to rule was being challenged by several factions within the French kingdom: King Charles II of Navarre questioned the Valois' dynastic legitimacy and tried to mobilise the French nobility and the citizens of Paris and other bonnes villes in order to seize the French throne for himself. At the same time, the merchants of Paris, under their leader Etienne Marcel, tried to limit royal power, especially in financial matters, by having the Estates-General pass the Great Ordinance of 1357. Meanwhile, a peasants' rebellion in Northern France known as the Jacquerie challenged the nobility's right to rule. While the noblemen suppressed the peasants, Charles of Navarre discredited himself by joining ranks with the partly violent merchants of Paris who not long after murdered their leader Marcel. Thus the resistance against Valois rule collapsed mostly of its own accord.

After this major crisis and after ascending the throne in 1364, Charles V started a cultural programme of scientific writing and translations to support his dynasty's fragile legitimacy and to facilitate governing. The target audience of this programme were his councillors and courtiers whose Latin was mostly insufficient to easily read the original texts. Between 1370 and 1377, at the behest of Charles V, Oresme translated and annotated Aristotle's moral works, namely the Nicomachean Ethics, the Politics, and the pseudo-Aristotelian Economics, into French. Probably as a reward for this accomplishment, he was appointed bishop of Lisieux in 1378, where he died in 1382.

A printed version of the Politiques was published in 1489 by Antoine Vérard. Oresme's translation was later replaced by Louis Le Roy who in 1568 published his French translation from the Greek original.

== Methods of translation and annotation ==
Oresme justified his translation from Latin, the savant language of his time, to the more vulgar Middle French as part of the translatio studii. He coined numerous French neologisms still used today by giving originally Greek terms a French ending and sounding. In his glosses, he not only tried to explain Aristotle's thoughts, but also developed his own political ideas, especially concerning the political stability and durability of the relatively young Valois dynasty.

Oresme makes use of earlier commentaries written by Albert the Great, Thomas Aquinas and Peter of Auvergne, and also quotes Marsilius of Padua's Defensor pacis (1324). Oresme among others was accused of having written a French translation of this highly controversial work in 1375, but was acquitted of this charge.

== Content ==
Like his predecessors Albert the Great, Thomas Aquinas and Peter of Auvergne (and quite unlike Aristotle), Oresme favours monarchy as the best form of government. His criterion for good government is the common good. A king (by definition good) takes care of the common good, whereas a tyrant works for his own profit. A monarch can ensure the stability and durability of his reign by letting the people participate in government. This has rather confusingly and anachronistically been called popular sovereignty. Like Albert the Great, Thomas Aquinas, Peter of Auvergne and especially Marsilius of Padua, whom he occasionally quotes, Oresme conceives of this popular participation as rather restrictive: only the multitude of reasonable, wise and virtuous men should be allowed political participation by electing and correcting the prince, changing the law and passing judgement. Oresme, however, categorically denies the right of rebellion since it endangers the common good. This is possibly a consequence of his witnessing the crisis of 1356–1360 and its subsequent rebellions. Unlike earlier commentators, Oresme prescribes the law as superior to the king's will. It must be changed only in cases of extreme necessity. Oresme favours moderate kingship, thereby negating contemporary absolutist thought, usually promoted by adherents of Roman law. Furthermore, Oresme doesn't comply to contemporary conceptions of the French king as sacred, as promoted by Évrart de Trémaugon in his Songe du vergier or Jean Golein in his Traité du sacre. Although he heavily criticises the Church as corrupt, tyrannical and oligarchical, he never fundamentally questions its necessity for the spiritual well-being of the faithful.

== Extant manuscripts ==
There are 18 known manuscripts of the Politiques in three redactions. The individual copies usually contain Oresme's translation of the pseudo-Aristotelian Economics (Livre de Yconomique) and often form a set with Oresme's translation of the Nicomachean Ethics (Livre de Ethiques). Léopold Delisle considered Ms. 223 from Avranches, Bibliothèque municipale, to have been Oresme's personal copy as it contains the first redaction and subsequent changes as well as the Yconomiques, although a corresponding copy of the Ethiques is not extant. The richly illuminated library copy presented to King Charles V is currently in possession of the Comte de Waziers in Paris and therefore not available to the public. The equally lavishly illuminated private copy of Charles V is preserved at the Bibliothèque royale de Belgique in Brussels, Ms. 11201–02 (formerly Ms. 2904).

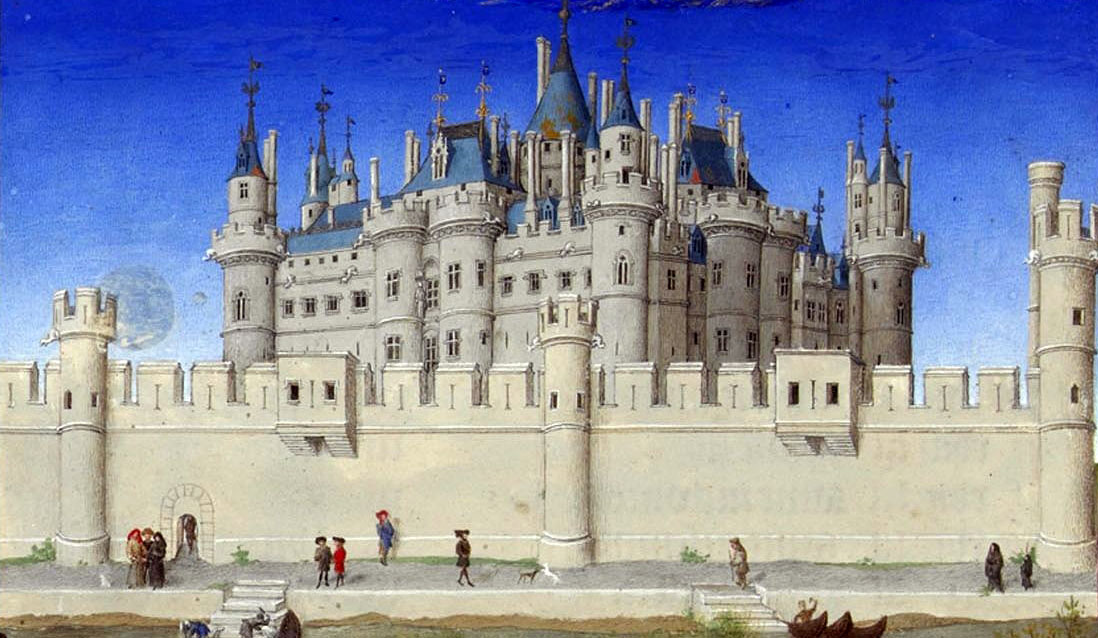
The Château du Louvre, where the illuminated library copies of the Livre de Politiques were kept, as depicted in the 15th-century Très riches heures du duc de Berry.

== Reception ==
Oresme's Aristotelian translations may have had a major influence on King Charles V's policies: Charles' laws concerning the line of succession and the possibility of a regency for an underage king have been accredited to Oresme, as has the election of several high-ranking officials by the king's council in the early 1370s. Oresme may have conveyed Marsilian and conciliarist thought to Jean Gerson and Christine de Pizan.

== Bibliography ==
=== Primary literature ===
- Le Livre de Politiques d'Aristote, ed. by Antoine Vérard, Paris 1489 (https://gallica.bnf.fr/ark:/12148/bpt6k1510586w).
- Le Livre de Politiques d'Aristote. Published from the Text of the Avranches Manuscript 223, ed. by Albert Douglas Menut, in: Transactions of the American Philosophical Society 60,6 (1970), 1–392 (http://www.jstor.org/stable/1006105).

=== Secondary literature ===
- Mario Grignaschi: Nicolas Oresme et son commentaire à la «Politique» d'Aristote, in: Album Helen Maud Cam, Louvain 1960 (Studies Presented to the International Commission for the History of Representative and Parliamentary Institutions, 23), 95–151.
- Shulamith Shahar: Nicolas Oresme, un penseur politique indépendant de l'entourage du roi Charles V, in: L'information historique 32 (1970), 203–209.
- Susan M. Babbitt: Oresme's Livre de Politiques and the France of Charles V., in: Transactions of the American Philosophical Society 75,1 (1985), 1–158 (https://www.jstor.org/stable/1006379).
- Pierre Souffrin; A. Ph. Segonds (eds.): Nicolas Oresme. Tradition et innovation chez un intellectuel du XIVe siècle, Paris 1988 (Science et humanisme).
- Jeannine Quillet (ed.): Autour de Nicole Oresme. Actes du Colloque Oresme organisé à l'Université de Paris XII, Paris 1990 (Bibliothèque d'histoire de la philosophie).
- Serge Lusignan: Lire, indexer et gloser. Nicole Oresme et la ›Politique‹ d'Aristote, in: Caroline Bourlet, Annie Dufour (eds.): L 'écrit dans la société medievale. Divers aspects de sa pratique du XIe au XVe siècle, Paris 1991, 167–181.
- James M. Blythe: Ideal Government and the Mixed Constitution in the Middle Ages, Princeton, New Jersey 1992, chapter 12: Nicole Oresme and the Synthesis of Aristotelian Political Thought.
- Jacques Krynen: Aristotélisme et réforme de l'Etat, en France, au XIVe siècle, in: Jürgen Miethke (ed.): Das Publikum politischer Theorie im 14. Jahrhundert, München 1992 (Schriften des Historischen Kollegs, 21), 225–236. (available at: http://www.historischeskolleg.de/fileadmin/pdf/kolloquien_pdf/Kolloquien21.pdf)
- Jacques Krynen: L'empire du roi. Ideés et croyances politiques en France. XIIIe–XVe siècle, Paris 1993 (Bibliothèque des histoires).
- Ulrich Meier: Mensch und Bürger. Die Stadt im Denken spätmittelalterlicher Theologen, Philosophen und Juristen, München 1994, chapter III.4: Citoyen oder bourgeois, Reichs- oder Stadtbürger? Themen und Tendenzen in den Politikkommentaren des 14. und 15. Jahrhunderts:
- Ulrich Meier: Molte revoluzioni, molte novità. Gesellschaftlicher Wandel im Spiegel der politischen Philosophie und im Urteil von städtischen Chronisten des späten Mittelalters, in: Jürgen Miethke, Klaus Schreiner (eds.): Sozialer Wandel im Mittelalter. Wahrnehmungsformen, Erklärungsmuster, Regelungsmechanismen, Sigmaringen 1994, 119–176. (available at: http://wwwhomes.uni-bielefeld.de/umeier/texte/Molte_rivoluzioni.pdf)
- Claire Richter Sherman: Imaging Aristotle. Verbal and Visual Representation in Fourteenth-Century France, Berkeley 1995.
- Joel Kaye: A History of Balance, 1250–1375. The Emergence of a New Model of Equilibrium and its Impact on Thought, Cambridge 2014, chapter 7: The new model of equilibrium in medieval political thought, part 2: The writings of Nicole Oresme.
- Vanina Kopp: Der König und die Bücher. Sammlung, Nutzung und Funktion der königlichen Bibliothek am spätmittelalterlichen Hof in Frankreich, Ostfildern 2016 (Beihefte der Fancia, 80).

=== External links ===
- http://jonas.irht.cnrs.fr/oeuvre/3747 (codicological information on the manuscripts, supplied by the Institut de Recherche et d’Histoire des Textes)

== See also ==
- List of medieval Latin commentators on Aristotle
