= Fifth Council of the Lateran =

1512–17 Catholic ecumenical council

- Date: 1512–1517
- Accepted by: Catholic Church; Old Catholic Church; Traditional Catholic Churches
- Previous council: Council of Florence
- Next council: Council of Trent
- Convoked by: Pope Julius II
- President: Pope Julius II; Pope Leo X
- Attendance: About 100 bishops, mostly Italians
- Topics: Church discipline
- Documents and statements: Five decrees, allowed pawn shops, permission required to print books

The Fifth Council of the Lateran, held between 1512 and 1517, was the eighteenth ecumenical council of the Catholic Church and was the last council before the Protestant Reformation and the Council of Trent. This was the first time since 1213 that the Papal States would host an ecumenical council. It is so far the last time that Rome’s Lateran Palace (which had hosted 4 ecumenical councils in the past) has been the venue for such an event.

It was convoked by Pope Julius II with a political motive of restoring peace between warring Catholic rulers and to re-assert the authority of the Pope.

After Pope Leo X took over in 1513, the Council attempted various institutional, dogmatic and social welfare reforms. Institutional reforms were intended to improve unity, reduce nepotism, absenteeism, disinterest, luxury and simony for high church officials, improve the training and regulation of priests, to strengthen the position of bishops over friars, and to assert the independence of the church and clergy from lay control. The social welfare reform allowed no-interest microfinance lending by monti di pietà.

These addressed some issues that had been raised by contemporary reformers, but were not the particular issues that the subsequent Protestant Reformation alighted on. As with the immediately previous Councils, its institutional reforms were ineffectively implemented at that time.

== Background ==
When elected pope in 1503, Pope Julius II promised under oath to convoke a general council, but his promise was not initially fulfilled.

=== Political background ===
The Republic of Venice had encroached on papal rights in Venetian territories by independently filling vacant episcopal sees, subjecting clergy to secular tribunals and generally disregarding the ecclesiastical jurisdiction of Julius II in other ways. In 1509, Julius II joined the League of Cambrai, a coalition formed to restore lands that had been recently conquered by Venice to their original owners. Julius II censured Venice with an interdict and deployed the armies of the Papal States, along with the combined forces of the League of Cambrai, to Venetian-occupied Romagna. There, Venice suffered a complete defeat at the Battle of Agnadello, on 14 May 1509. In 1510, Venice negotiated with Julius II, who withdrew from the League of Cambrai and removed the censure in exchange for terms that included Venice agreeing to return disputed towns in Romagna, to renounce claims to fill vacant benefices, to acknowledge jurisdiction of ecclesiastical tribunals over clergy and their immunity to secular tribunals including exemption from taxes, to revoke all unauthorised treaties made with towns in the Papal States, to abandon appeal to a future general council against the papal bans and to concede free navigation of the Adriatic Sea to Papal States subjects.

The first stages of conflict between the Papal States and France began in 1510. King Louis XII of France demanded that the Republic of Florence declare definitively its allegiance. However, declaring allegiance to France would expose Florence to an immediate attack, and alienate its citizens, who dreaded a conflict with the head of the Church. Additionally, Florence was full of antagonistic parties and irreconcilable interests. To gain time, Florence sent Niccolò Machiavelli on a diplomatic mission to France in July 1510, where he found Louis XII eager for war and inclined towards the idea of a general council to depose Julius II.

Julius II was a soldier, and his goal was to free the entire Italian Peninsula from subjection to foreign powers. However, only Venice and the Old Swiss Confederacy were ready to field armies against the French. Julius II began hostilities by deposing and excommunicating his vassal, Alfonso I d'Este, Duke of Ferrara, who supported France. Louis XII retaliated in September 1510 by convoking a synod of French bishops at Tours, which judged that the pope had no right to make war upon a foreign prince and if the pope undertook such a war, the foreign prince had the right to invade the Papal States and to withdraw his subjects' obedience to the pope. The synod also threatened Julius II with a general council. Julius II ignored the French synod and again assumed personal command of the army in Northern Italy. In August 1510, at Bologna, he became dangerously ill but then recovered. In October, he negotiated an anti-French alliance. In the beginning, the alliance included only the Papal States, Venice and Spain, but in November, England joined and was soon followed by the emperor and by Switzerland. The Papal States marched against Mirandola, which was captured on 20 January 1511. On 23 May 1511, contingents of the French army captured Bologna from the papal troops and reinstated Annibale II Bentivoglio.

Under the leadership of Gaston of Foix, Duke of Nemours, the French were at first successful, but after his death, they yielded to the superior forces of the League. After being defeated in the Battle of Ravenna in 1512, they retreated beyond the Alps. Bologna again submitted to Julius II, and the cities of Parma, Reggio and Piacenza became part of the Papal States.

=== Conciliabulum of Pisa ===
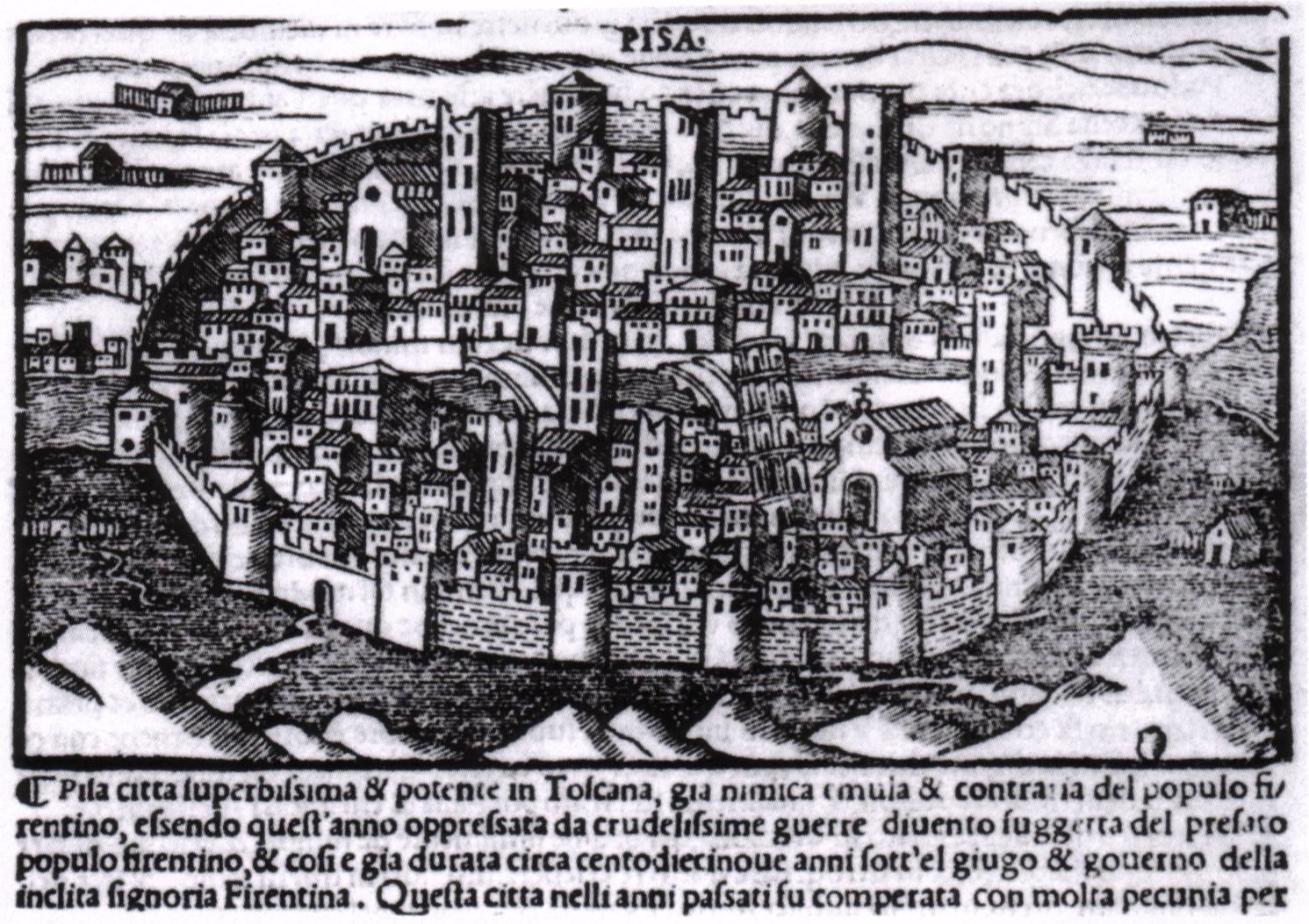
Contemporary engraving of the city of Pisa

The reforms of the Council of Constance (1414–1418) and the Council of Basel-Ferrara-Florence (1431–1449) failed. At the Synods of Orleans and Tours, in 1510, the French decided to convoke a general council. In view of the Council of Constance decree Frequens and the delay of Julius II to convoke a general council as he had sworn in the papal conclave, the schismatic conciliabulum convened at Pisa in 1511. Florence permitted the conciliabulum to use Pisa as the location; this estranged Julius II, and both Florence and Pisa were placed under an interdict. According to Marco Pellegrini, the Gallican conciliabulum "shows how some members of the Sacred College were ever open to schismatic solutions".

According to Kraus, it was intended by French politicians to restrain Julius II, and to recognize by general council of the principles of the 1438 Pragmatic Sanction of Bourges, drawn from the articles of the Council of Constance and the Council of Basel-Ferrara-Florence. The schismatic conciliabulum at Pisa was attended by only a few prelates including Cardinals Bernardino López de Carvajal, Guillaume Briçonnet, Francesco Borgia, Federico Sanseverino, and René de Prie. (Note: According to Leclercq, four cardinals met at Pisa and proxies representing three others, several bishops and abbots were also present. Ott set the number of cardinals at five. According to Schaff-Herzog, the schismatic conciliabulum was called by nine cardinals under Carvajal, three of whom, however, had not formally given assent, to convene Sept. 1, 1511. The handful of members held three sessions at Pisa.) They were encouraged by Maximilian I, Holy Roman Emperor, and Louis XII. According to Shahan, dissatisfaction with treatment by Julius II, as well as subserviency to the excommunicate Louis XII, led Carvajal to that rebellious attitude. The council was held first in the choir of the San Michele in Borgo and then in that of the Cathedral of Pisa.

Maximilian I, who had planned since 1507 to procure his own election to the papacy after Julius died, at first gave his protection to the schismatic conciliabulum at Pisa. Then, he withdrew it, and the German bishops also refused to have anything to do with the schismatic tendencies of the French. On 18 July 1511, Julius II summoned a general council, the Fifth Lateran Council, at Rome; it assembled there on 19 April 1512, with a very small attendance that had only Italian prelates.

Julius deprived the four leading schismatic cardinals of their dignities, deposed them from their offices and excommunicated the conciliabulum participants.

After the conciliabulum transferred from Pisa to Milan because of popular opposition, possibly elected Carvajal as Antipope Martin VI.

Soon afterward, in 1512, fearing the Swiss mercenaries invasion of the French occupied Duchy of Milan, the conciliabulum participants departed to Asti and then Lyon, France, where they abandoned the conciliabulum later that year.

The schismatic conciliabulum was a political step aimed at Julius II, who was involved in conflict with the Duchy of Ferrara and France. The whole matter was a futile attempt to revive 15th century conciliarism and to use it for political purposes.

=== Convocation of Lateran Council ===
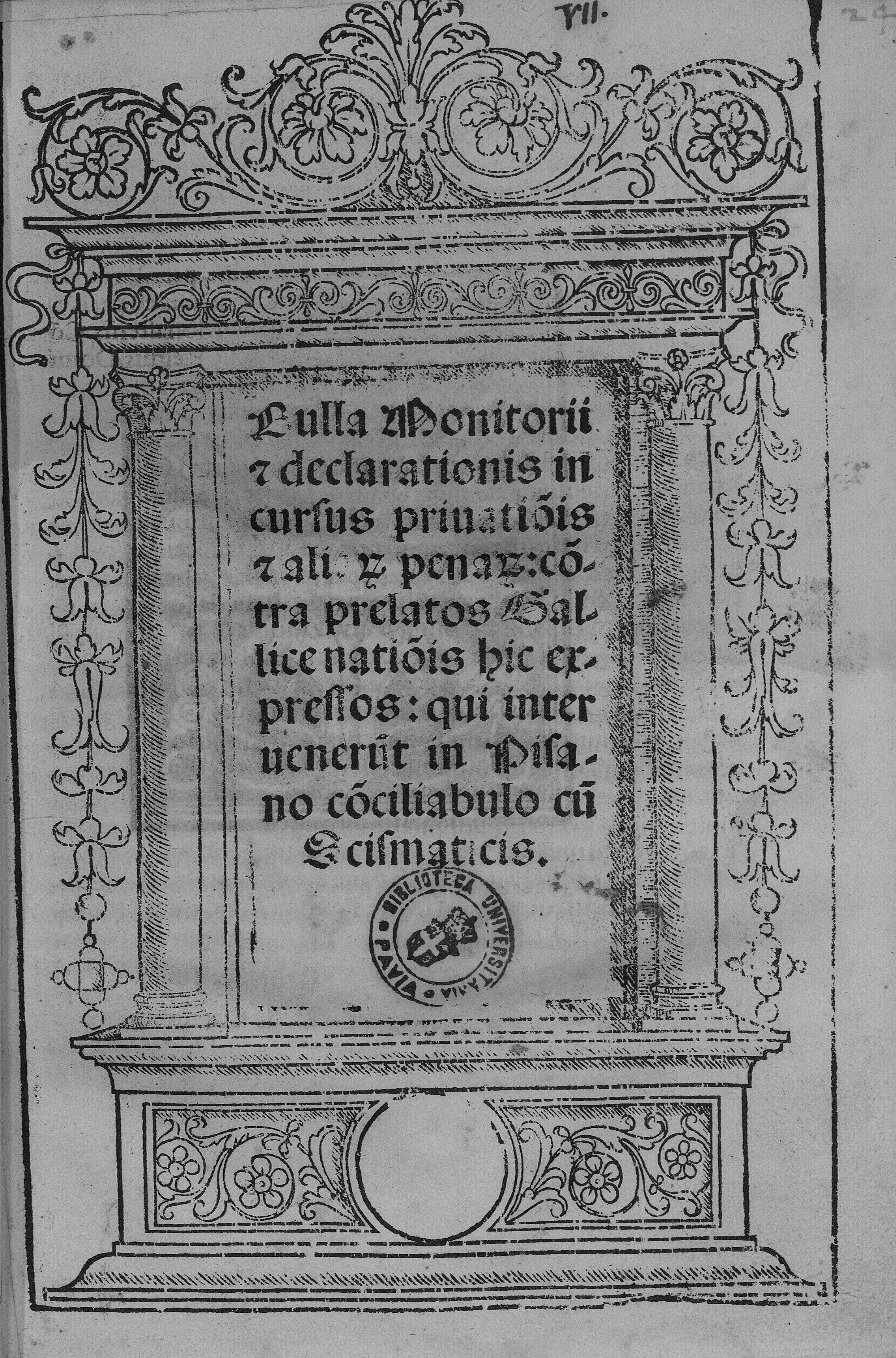
Pope Julius II, Bulla monitorii et declarationis, 1511

Julius II was quick to oppose the conciliabulum and convoked a general council by a papal bull of 18 July 1511, which was to meet on 19 April 1512 in the Archbasilica of St. John Lateran, in Rome. The bull not only was a canonical document but also was polemical in content. Julius refuted the allegation by the cardinals for their Pisa conciliabulum. He declared that his promise before his election as pope was sincere; that since he became pope, he had always sought to call a general council; that to prepare the general council, he had endeavored to bring an end to quarrels between rulers; that subsequent wars had made calling the council inopportune. Julius then reproached the participants at Pisa for their lack of respect by calling a council without the pope, who was supposed to lead. He also said that the three months of preparation for Pisa was not enough. Finally, he declared that no one should attach any significance to the statements made at Pisa.

A war of polemics was waged about the councils, pitting Thomas Cajetan, the Dominican Master General, on the papal side against the conciliarist arguments of Jacques Almain, the spokesman of the University of Paris.

France's victory over the Papal States and the Spanish Empire at the Battle of Ravenna (1512) hindered the opening of the council called by Julius II.

During the council, the ambassador of the Holy Roman Emperor announced that Maximilian had rejected the decisions made by the conciliabulum at Pisa, and a similar announcement was made by Louis XII's ambassador. At the seventh session, in 1513, Carvajal and Sanseverino separated from their French colleagues and formally renounced the schism, and they were restored by Leo X to their offices.

Alessandro Geraldini, the first Archbishop of Santo Domingo, attended the eleventh session, likely making him to first prelate from the Western Hemisphere to attend an Ecumenical Council.

== Location ==
The arrangements for the council were done by the papal master of ceremonies Paride de Grassi, who prepared by reaching out to several individuals who had knowledge of the proceeding and structures for previous councils, such as Constance and Florence. De Grassi constructed a main council chamber inside the nave of the Lateran Basilica. This chamber was surrounded by a wall to protect the privacy of the proceedings. Rooms for eating and latrines were constructed within it, as the participants could not leave the premises during the council. A second smaller room was constructed in the aula concilii in the Lateran Palace, and was designed for the purpose of having a smaller locations were the pope, cardinals, emperors, and other high-ranking members could enjoy more privacy. However, the aula concilii housed only one meeting and no formal sessions were conducted in it. The details of the room, measurements, structures, and facilities were reconstructed by scholar Nelson Minnich, who heavily relied on the diaries of Paride De Grassi himself.

== Meetings and decision ==
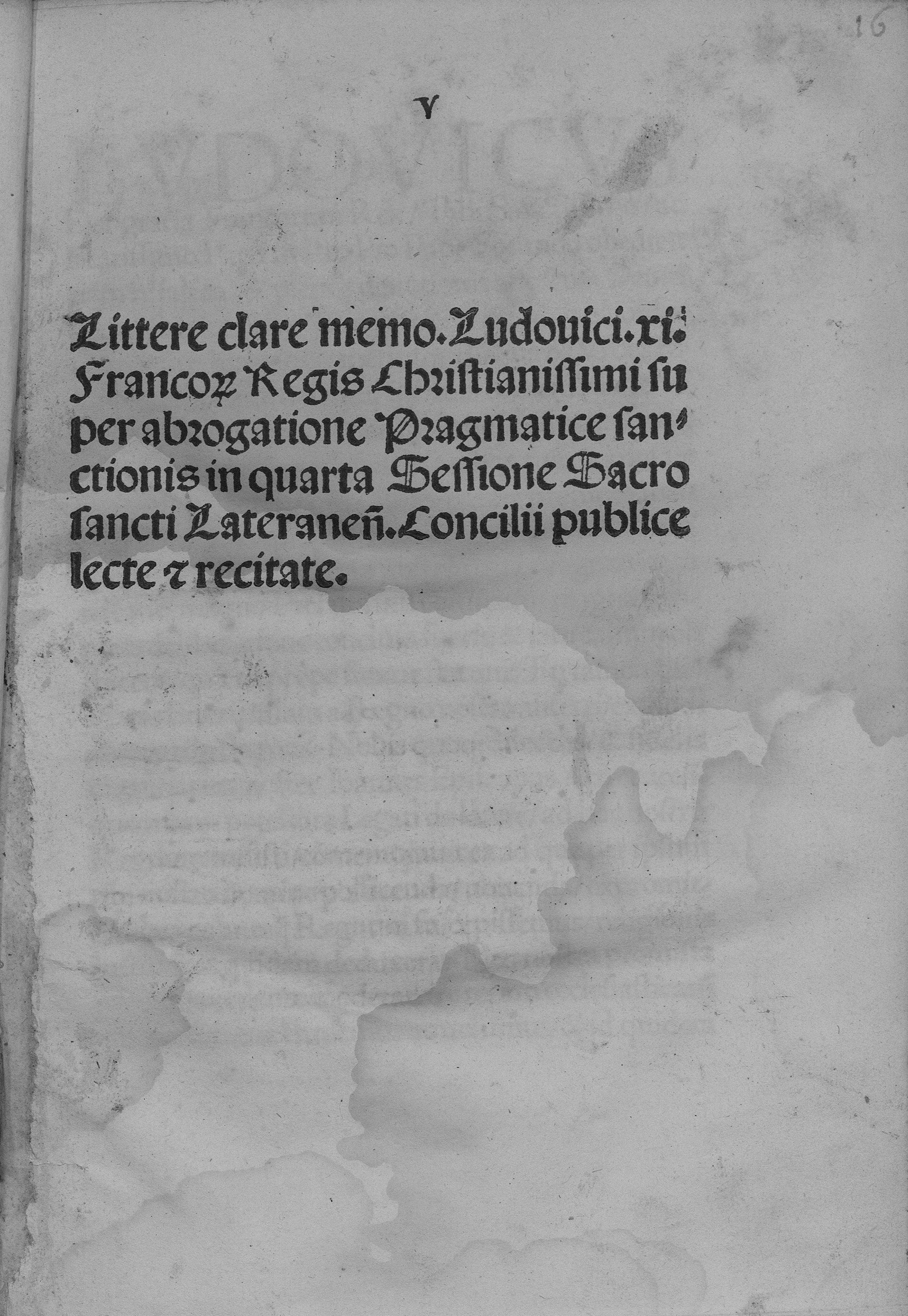
Louis XII of France, Litterae super abrogatione pragmatice sanctionis, 1512

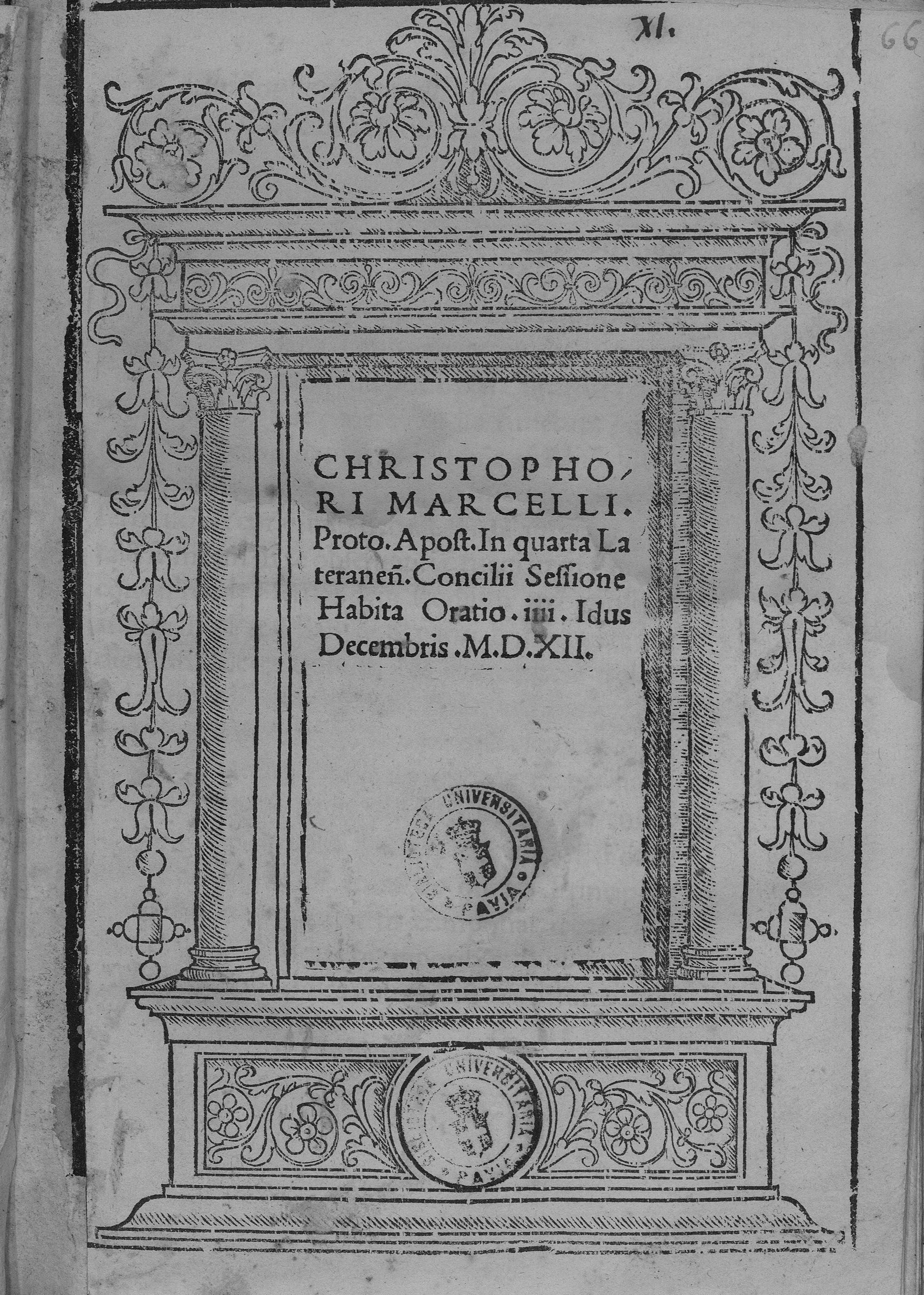
Cristoforo Marcello, In quarta Lateranensis Concilii sessione habita oratio, 1513

The Council finally met on 3 May 1512 at the Archbasilica of St. John Lateran. The scholar and preacher Cardinal Egidio da Viterbo (Giles of Viterbo) gave an inspiring opening address on the need for urgent reform, which was widely printed and puts many of the concerns of Catholic reformists and humanists, such as Ximenez, von Staupitz, John Colet and Erasmus.

Participants included fifteen cardinals, the Latin patriarchs of Alexandria and Antioch, ten archbishops, fifty-six bishops, some abbots and generals of religious orders, the ambassadors of Maximilian I, Holy Roman Emperor and those of Venice and of Florence. After Julius II died, his successor, Pope Leo X, continued the council, and the last session was held on 16 March 1517.

Several decrees were published, most for institutional reform and political peace rather than doctrinal clarification, including:

- A rejection and condemnation of the [[Council of Pisa|conciliabulum of Pisa]], quashing everything done by it.
- The nullification of a Papal election where simony is exposed.
- An invitation to Hussites to attend and negotiate re-integration, with better security guarantees.
- Establishing age limits (over 30) for bishops: this was aimed at reducing nepotism and absentee bishops. The Council encouraged cardinal-nephews.
- Establishing better criteria for abbots.
- Establishing peer review by cardinals of each other's visitation reports.
- Stricter regulation of the Roman curia.
- Sumptuory regulations for cardinals and bishops.
- A confirmation of the excommunications of cardinals by Julius II (1512).
- Inter multiplices, a Bull promulgated by Leo X on 4 May 1515, sanctioning the monti di pietà: financial institutions under strict ecclesiastical supervision, which provided loans to the needy in the manner of pawn shops and had attracted both support and opposition from within the church since their establishment in the previous century.
- Apostolici Regiminis, on the immortality of the soul, usually believed to have been directed against Pietro Pomponazzi
- One concerning the freedom of the Church and the dignity of bishops, that lay people have no power over clerics; also that bishops have authority over friars in their churches.
- A requirement that a local bishop give permission before the printing of a new book.
- Confirmation of the contemporaneous 1516 Concordat of Bologna between the Holy See and the Kingdom of France and abrogation of the 1438 Pragmatic Sanction of Bourges.
- A lengthy section calling for peace between princes, and that everyone with any influence must do so.
- Advocation of war against the Turks to reclaim the Holy Land, to be funded by three years of tax levies.
- Condemnation of all propositions contradicting "the truth of the enlightened Christian faith", restrictions on clergy teachings about the "nature of the rational soul" and regulation of university course sequences for clerics' studies in philosophy and poetry. A call to all philosophy teachers to complement any lesson that contradicts the Christian faith with "convincing arguments" from the Christian point of view.
- Requirement for documented competence in preaching.
- Apocalyptic preaching was forbidden: preachers must not "presume to preach or declare a fixed time for future evils, the coming of Antichrist or the precise Day of Judgment; for Truth says, it is not for us to know times or seasons which the Father has fixed by his own authority."

== Effect ==
Little was done to put the work of the council into practice. In the view of a Franciscan teacher:

Yet, for all its solemnity, five years' labors, and many sincere and earnest speakers, the Fifth Lateran was not to achieve reform. [...] Few if any of the Council's decrees ever left paper. A serious effort to put them into practice might have made an impression, but none was made.

The Vatican website introduction to the session reports of the Council notes that while reform of the curia failed, suppression of the Pisa pseudo-council succeeded, though the small number of attending bishops had raised questions about its status as a true "ecumenical" council.

The Pope's need for more money to finance military operations against the Turks in the Holy Lands and to re-establish Rome's prestige and centrality, which underpins several of the Council's discussions, was behind the so-called "sale of indulgences" scandal that precipitated Martin Luther's Ninety-five Theses, which were published just seven months after the close of the council. According to historian Nelson Minnich, Luther was shocked that the Lateran Council had in his view abrogated decisions of previous councils and he adopted sola scriptura in consequence.

Whether or not the Protestant Reformation could have been avoided if the reforms had been implemented is a matter of debate: Johann Eck thought so. Council recommendations were applied to an extent in Italy, Spain and parts of France, but blocked in England and not implemented at all in Germany.

== Sources ==
- One or more of the preceding sentences incorporates text from a publication now in the public domain: Benigni, Umberto (1912). "Montes Pietatis". In Herbermann, Charles (ed.). Catholic Encyclopedia. Vol. 15. New York: Robert Appleton Company.
- One or more of the preceding sentences incorporates text from this source, which is in the public domain: Burd, L. Arthur (1903) [1902]. "Florence (II) Machiavelli". In Ward, Adolphus W.; et al. (eds.). The Cambridge Modern History. Vol. 1. New York; London: Macmillan. OCLC 609661773.
- Burns, James H.; Izbicki, Thomas M., eds. (1997). Conciliarism and Papalism. Cambridge texts in the history of political thought. Cambridge [u.a.]: Cambridge University Press. ISBN 0-521-47089-7.
- Constant, Eric A. (2002). "A Reinterpretation of the Fifth Lateran Council Decree Apostolici regiminis (1513)". Sixteenth Century Journal. 33 (2): 353–379. doi:10.2307/4143912. ISSN 0361-0160. JSTOR 4143912. S2CID 159661929.
- This article incorporates text from a publication in the public domain: Jackson, Samuel Macauley, ed. (1911). "Councils of Pisa". New Schaff–Herzog Encyclopedia of Religious Knowledge. Vol. 9 (third ed.). London and New York: Funk and Wagnalls. p. 73.
- Catholic Church. Lateran Council V (2007) [Documents promulgated 1512–1517]. Fifth Lateran Council (IntraText ed.). Rome: Èulogos SpA – via The IntraText Digital Library. Introduction and translation taken from Tanner, Norman P, ed. (1990). Decrees of the Ecumenical Councils. London: Sheed & Ward. ISBN 0-87840-490-2.
- One or more of the preceding sentences incorporates text from this source, which is in the public domain: Kraus, Franz X. (1907) [1904]. "Medicean Rome". In Ward, Adolphus W.; et al. (eds.). The Cambridge Modern History. Vol. 2. New York; London: Macmillan. OCLC 609661773.
- One or more of the preceding sentences incorporates text from this source, which is in the public domain: Leathes, Stanley Mordaunt (1903) [1902]. "Italy and her invaders". In Ward, Adolphus W.; et al. (eds.). The Cambridge Modern History. Vol. 1. New York; London: Macmillan. OCLC 609661773.
- This article incorporates text from a publication now in the public domain: Leclercq, Henri (1910). "Fifth Lateran Council (1512-17)". In Herbermann, Charles (ed.). Catholic Encyclopedia. Vol. 9. New York: Robert Appleton Company.
- Minnich, Nelson H. (1974), "The Participants at the Fifth Lateran Council", Archivum Historiae Pontificiae 12 (1974), pp. 157–206.
- Minnich, Nelson H. (2007). "Julius II and Leo X as presidents of the Fifth Lateran Council (1512-1517)". In Alazard, Florence; La Branca, Frank (eds.). La papauté à la Renaissance. XLVIe Colloque international d'études humanistes, at the Centre d'études supérieures de la Renaissance, in Tours, 30 June to 4 July 2003. Savoir de Mantice. Vol. 12. Paris: Honoré Champion Éditeur. pp. 153–166. ISBN 9782745315717.
- One or more of the preceding sentences incorporates text from a publication now in the public domain: Ott, Michael (1910). "Pope Julius II". In Herbermann, Charles (ed.). Catholic Encyclopedia. Vol. 8. New York: Robert Appleton Company.
- Pellegrini, Marco (2004) [2002]. "A turning-point in the history of the factional system in the Sacred College : the power of the pope and cardinals in the age of Alexander VI". In Signorotto, Gianvittorio; Visceglia, Maria A. (eds.). Court and Politics in Papal Rome, 1492-1700. Cambridge studies in Italian history and culture. Cambridge: Cambridge University Press. p. 16. ISBN 9780521641463.
- One or more of the preceding sentences incorporates text from a publication now in the public domain: Shahan, Thomas (1908). "Bernardino Lopez de Carvajal". In Herbermann, Charles (ed.). Catholic Encyclopedia. Vol. 3. New York: Robert Appleton Company.
- Tanner, Norman P. (2001). The Councils of the Church : a short history. New York: Crossroad. ISBN 978-0-8245-1904-9.
