= Donato Acciaioli =

Italian scholar and statesman

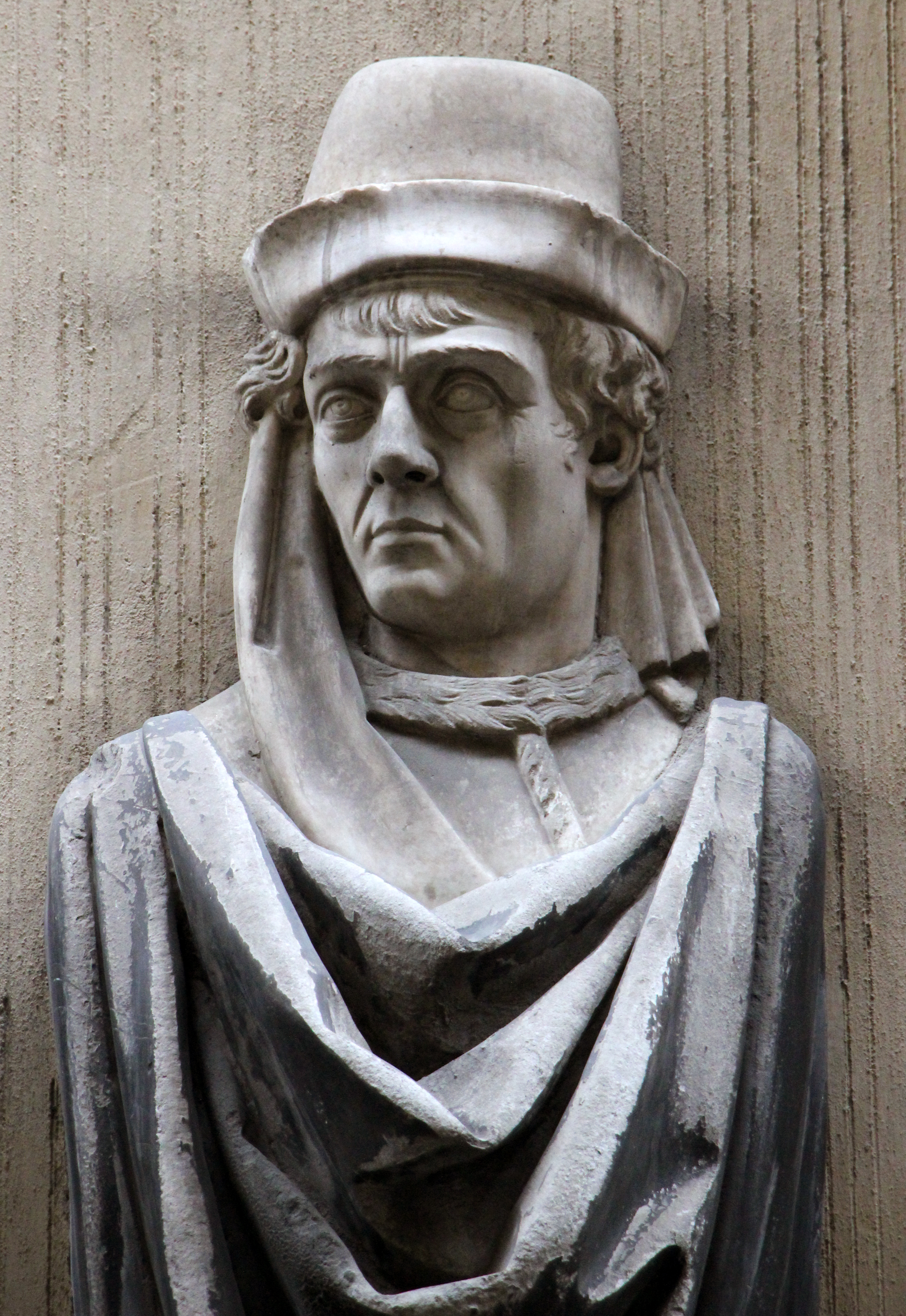

Donato Acciaioli (15 March 1428 – 28 August 1478) was an Italian scholar and statesman. He was known for his learning, especially in Greek and mathematics, and for his services to his native state, the Republic of Florence.

== Biography ==
He was born in Florence, Italy. He was educated under the patronage or guidance of Jacopo Piccolomini-Ammannati (1422–1479), who subsequently was named cardinal. He also putatively gained his knowledge of the classics from Lionardo and Carlo Marsuppini (1399–1453) and from the refugee scholar from Byzantium, Giovanni Argiropolo.

Having previously been entrusted with several important embassies, in 1473 he became Gonfalonier of Florence, one of the nine citizens selected by drawing lots every two months, who formed the government. He died at Milan in 1478, when on his way to Paris to ask the aid of Louis XI on behalf of the Florentines against Pope Sixtus IV. His body was taken back to Florence and buried in the church of the Carthusian order at the public expense, and his daughters were endowed by his fellow-citizens, since he had little in terms of wealth.

He wrote Latin translations of some of Plutarch's Lives (Florence, 1478); Commentaries on Aristotle's Ethics, Politics, Physics, and De anima; the lives of Hannibal, Scipio and Charlemagne as well as the biography of the grand seneschal of the Kingdom of Naples, Niccolò Acciaioli by Matteo Palmieri. In the work on Aristotle he had the cooperation of his master John Argyropulus.

== See also ==
- Zanobi Acciaioli, Librarian of the Vatican, of the same family
