= Crisostomo Javelli =

Italian Dominican philosopher, professor and inquisitor

Crisostomo Javelli (Note: His given name was Crisostomo (Chrysostom, Chrysostomus), not Giovanni Crisostomo (John Chrysostom, Johannes Chrysostomus). The family name was Javelli, also spelled Iavelli or Giavelli in Italian, sometimes Javellus in Latin. He often published using a toponymic surname, most often da Casale (de Casali, Casalensis), indicating a connection with Casale Monferrato, but also Canapicius, indicating a connection with the Canavese.) (c. 1470 (Note: Javelli's own statements regarding his age in his writings are inconsistent, yielding birth dates between 1470 and 1474. He must have been at least forty years old when he became an inquisitor in 1515.) – c. 1539) was an Italian Dominican philosopher, professor and inquisitor. He is best known for his involvement in the dispute over the immortality of the soul in 1519.

== Life ==
Javelli's exact place of birth is uncertain, but he was from the Piedmont. One tradition place his birth in the village of San Giorgio, usually identified with San Giorgio Canavese, but possibly San Giorgio Monferrato. He joined the Dominican Order in 1488 at the convent of San Domenico in Casale Monferrato, which belonged to the observant congregation. After his notitiate, he was probably sent to the convent of Santa Maria degli Angeli in Ferrara for further education. He probably took holy orders in the early 1490s.

In 1495, Javelli entered the order's studium generale at San Domenico in Bologna, which was attached to the faculty of theology of the university. Among his teachers were Giovanni Cagnazzo da Taggia and Giorgio Cacatossici. After completing his studies, he worked as a priest until 1507, when he was appointed master of studies at Bologna under the regent master Eustachio Piazzesi. In 1514–1516, he served as bachelor of the Sentences at Bologna, succeeding Agostino Giustiniani. He was granted the degree of master of sacred theology on 18 February 1516 at the same ceremony as Francesco Silvestri da Ferrara.

From 1516 to 1518, Javelli was the inquisitor of Piacenza, Cremona and Crema, succeeding Cacatossici. From 1518 to 1521, he served as regent master of the Dominican studium in Bologna. In 1521, he returned to Piacenza to continue as inquisitor, residing in the convent of San Giovanni in Canale. In 1523, he became a professor of theology at the University of Piacenza, although he probably mostly taught at San Giovanni, "whose conventual school was open to the public". He continued to serve as inquisitor until his death.

The inquisitorial archive covering Javelli's years is lost, so that a detailed account of his inquisitorial activities cannot be given. He is known to have regularly visited Cremona and Crema, although he also used vicars in those territories. There is no evidence of witch hunts during his tenure, so popular under his predecessor. Javelli was more concerned with the spread of Lutheranism. In 1530, Javelli was drawn into the debate over Henry VIII's divorce. He wrote an initial tract in support of the divorce and another responding to criticisms.

The colophon to Javelli's last work Philosophia economica divina atque christiana, is dated 1 August 1538. He died sometime after that and before the end of 1540, since a letter of Andrea Arrivabene published that year refers to him in the past tense.

== Works ==
=== Themes ===
Javelli's surviving writings are mostly philosophical. All the genres typical of a Dominican inquisitor are absent from his oeuvre. He wrote no biblical commentary, no handbook of inquisitorial procedure and no hagiography. He was a Thomist and an Aristotelian.

Only four of Javelli's works were pieces written for a particular occasion. His first published work was a prologue (prologus) and index (reportorium) to a 1519 edition of Burchard of Mount Sion's Descriptio Terre Sancte. That same year he was drawn into the controversy over the immortality of the soul when Pietro Pomponazzi invited him to contribute "solutions" (solutiones) to Pomponazzi's objections to the soul's immortality. Javelli's response as well as the authors' exchange of letters was published as part of Pomponazzi's Defensorium. Javelli's involvement was required to get the work published. In 1533, Javelli wrote his Tractatus de animae humane indeficientia at the request of Alessandro del Caccia. Published in 1536, it is a history of the controversy and a more refined restatement of his own position in favour of the soul's immortality against Pomponazzi. Javelli's fourth occasional piece, his defence of Henry VIII's divorce, was never published.

The majority of Javelli's works were philosophical in nature. The early works, perhaps all written around 1520 only to be revised for publication later, are dedicated to a student named Crescentius. The first work of this type is his Compendium logicae, a textbook of logic in eleven tracts "remarkable for the clarity and orderliness of its exposition". This was followed by a series of summaries (epitomata) on the nonlogical works of Aristotle, entitled Preclarissimum epitoma super totam naturalem philosophiam et metaphysicam Aristotelis. It comprised eleven volumes published in 1531. In 1534, Javelli published three separate commentaries on Aristotle in the quaestiones format. In 1536, he published three more summaries of works by Aristotle.

In 1536, Javelli published two summaries of Plato's moral and political philosophy in a single volume. He defends Plato against Aristotle's criticisms and declares him superior in moral and political matters. He is heavily reliant on Marsilio Ficino's interpretations of Plato. In 1538–1540, he published three works (the first in two volumes) on Christian philosophy, demonstrating its superiority to the ancient Greek.

=== List of works ===
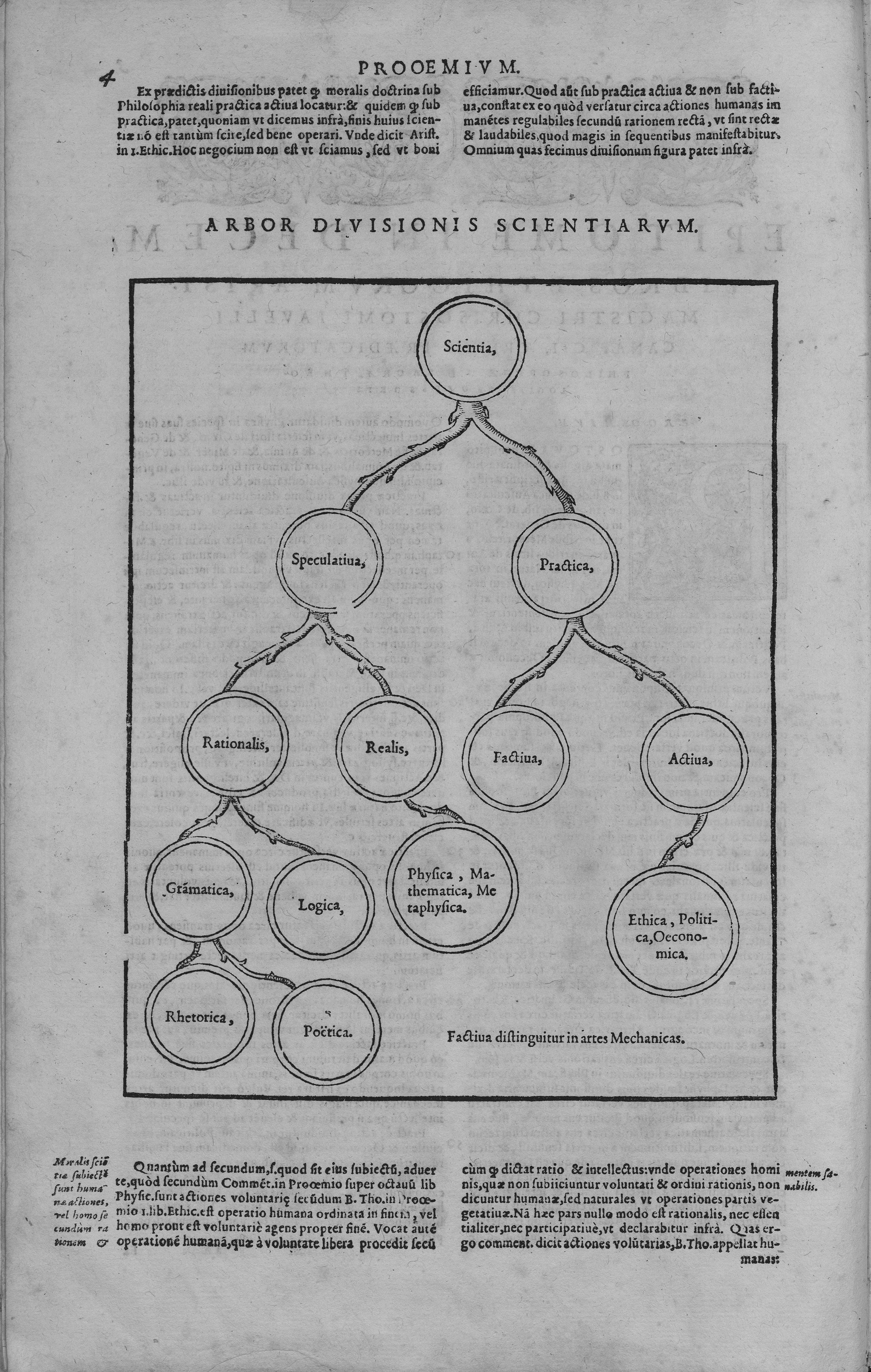
A page from the 1580 edition of Javelli's complete works

Almost all of Javelli's writings were collected into a single edition first published at Lyon in 1568 and subsequently at Venice in 1577 and again at Lyon in 1580. The following works are found in the opera omnia editions, with the initial date of publication (where applicable) followed by the date of completion (where known):

- Compendium logicae (1540)
- Preclarissimum epitoma super totam naturalem philosophiam et metaphysicam Aristotelis (1531)
  - Epitome in III De anima [1526]
  - Tractatus de primo et ultimo istanti [1526]
  - Epitome in III priores Meteorum [1527]
  - Commentarium in De Causis [1529]
  - Epitome in De bona fortuna [1529]
  - Epitome in Parva naturalia [1529]
  - Epitome in II De generatione et corruptione
  - Epitome in IV De coelo
  - Epitome in VIII Physicorum
  - Epitome in XII Metaphysicorum
  - Tractatus de transcendentibus
- Tractatus de Bona Fortuna (1531)
- Quaestiones in VIII Physicorum (1534 [1532])
- Quaestiones in XII Metaphysicorum (1534 [1532])
- Quaestiones in III De anima (1534 [1533])
- Tractatus de αnimae humanαe indeficientia (1536 [1533])
- Epitome in X Ethicorum (1536 [1534])
- Epitome in Oeconomicam (1536 [1535])
- Epitome in VIII Politicorum (1536 [1535])
- Epitome in Moralem Platonis philosophiam (1536 [1535])
- Epitome in Politicam Platonis (1536 [1535])
- De Christiana Philosophia I–II (1538 [1536])
- De Christiana Philosophia III–VIII (1539 [1537])
- Oeconomica Christiana (1540 [1538])
- Dispositio Politicae sive Christianae Philosophiae (1540)
- Epitome super Spheram
- Quaestio de conceptione B. Mariae V.
- Quaestio de Dei Praedestinatione et Reprobatione
- Quaestiones super Quartum Aristotelis Meteorum
- Quaestiones super De Sensu et Sensato
- Quaestiones super lib. De memoria et reminiscentia

== Bibliography ==
- Cappiello, Annalisa (2023). "Javelli, Pomponazzi and the Immortality of the Soul: From the Solutiones (1519) to the Tractatus de animae humanae indeficientia (1536)". In Tommaso De Robertis; Luca Burzelli (eds.). Chrysostomus Javelli: Pagan Philosophy and Christian Thought in the Renaissance. Springer. pp. 29–50. doi:10.1007/978-3-031-27673-6_2.
- De Robertis, Tommaso; Burzelli, Luca, eds. (2023). Chrysostomus Javelli: Pagan Philosophy and Christian Thought in the Renaissance. Springer.
- Tavuzzi, Michael (2023). "Chrysostomus Javelli OP (c. 1470–1540): A Biographical Introduction". In Tommaso De Robertis; Luca Burzelli (eds.). Chrysostomus Javelli: Pagan Philosophy and Christian Thought in the Renaissance. Springer. pp. 3–28. doi:10.1007/978-3-031-27673-6_1.
- Von Wille, Dagmar (2004). "Javelli, Giovanni Crisostomo". Dizionario Biografico degli Italiani (in Italian). Vol. 62: Iacobiti–Labriola. Rome: Istituto dell'Enciclopedia Italiana. ISBN 978-88-12-00032-6.
