= Camillo Porzio =

Italian historian (1526–1580)

Camillo Porzio (1526–1580) was an Italian historian.

== Life ==
He belonged to a wealthy and noble Neapolitan family, and was the son of the philosopher Simone Porzio. He studied law, first at Bologna and later at Pisa, and after graduating in utroque jure, practised as a lawyer in Naples.

His chief literary work is La Congiura dei baroni, a history of the unsuccessful conspiracy of the Neapolitan barons against King Ferdinand I of Naples in 1485; it is based on the authentic records of the state trials, but is prejudiced in favour of the royal power. It was first published by Manutius in Rome in 1565. Of Porzio's other works, the Storia d'Italia (from 1547 to 1552), of which only the first two books have survived, is the most important.
