= Simone Porzio =

Italian philosopher

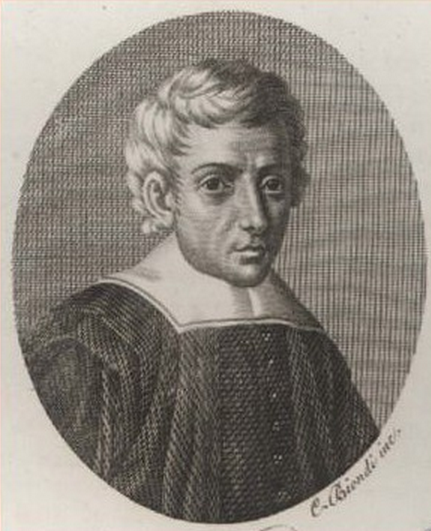
Simone Porzio

Simone Porzio (Simon Portius) (1496–1554) was an Italian philosopher, born and died in Naples.

== Life ==
Like his greater contemporary, Pomponazzi, he was a lecturer on medicine at Pisa (1546–1552), and in later life gave up purely scientific study for speculation on the nature of man. His philosophic theory was identical with that of Pomponazzi, whose De immortalitate animi he defended and amplified in a treatise De mente humana. There is told of him a story which illustrates the temper of the early humanistic revival in Italy. When he was beginning his first lecture at Pisa, he opened the meteorological treatises of Aristotle. The audience, composed of students and townspeople, interrupted him with the cry Quid de anima (We would hear about the soul), and Porzio was constrained to change the subject of his lecture. He professed the most open materialism, denied immortality in all forms and taught that the soul of man is homogeneous with the soul of animals and plants, material in origin and incapable of separate existence.

Simone Porzio was the father of Camillo Porzio.
