= Apostolici regiminis =

Papal bull on the immortality of the human soul

Coat of arms of pope Leo X

Apostolici Regiminis was a papal bull of Pope Leo X, issued by the Fifth Council of the Lateran on 19 December 1513, reaffirming the Roman Catholic doctrine of the immortality of the individual soul. Its object was to condemn a two-fold doctrine then current: that the soul of man is of its nature mortal, and that it is one and the same soul which animates all men. Others, prescinding from the teaching of revelation, held that doctrine to be true according to natural reason and philosophy. The bull is generally believed to have been motivated by opposition to the teachings of Pietro Pomponazzi and other secular Aristotelian philosophers of the time.

Leo X condemned the doctrine in itself and from every point of view. He refers to the definition of the Council of Vienne (1311) published by Pope Clement V (1305–14) which taught that the soul is "really, of itself, and essentially, the form of the body"; and then declares that it is of its own nature immortal, and that each body has a soul of its own.

This doctrine is said to be clear from those words of the Gospel, "But he cannot kill the soul", and "he who hates his soul in this world preserves it for eternal life". Moreover, if the condemned doctrine were true, the Incarnation would have been useless, and we should not need the Resurrection; and those who are the most holy would be the most wretched of all.

The Bull enjoins on all professors of philosophy in universities to expound for their pupils the true doctrine and refute the false one. To prevent such errors in future, the Bull makes it obligatory on all ecclesiastics, secular and regular, in holy orders, who devote their time to the study of philosophy and poetry for five years after the study of grammar and dialectic, to study also theology or canon law.
