= Marcantonio Zimara =

Italian philosopher

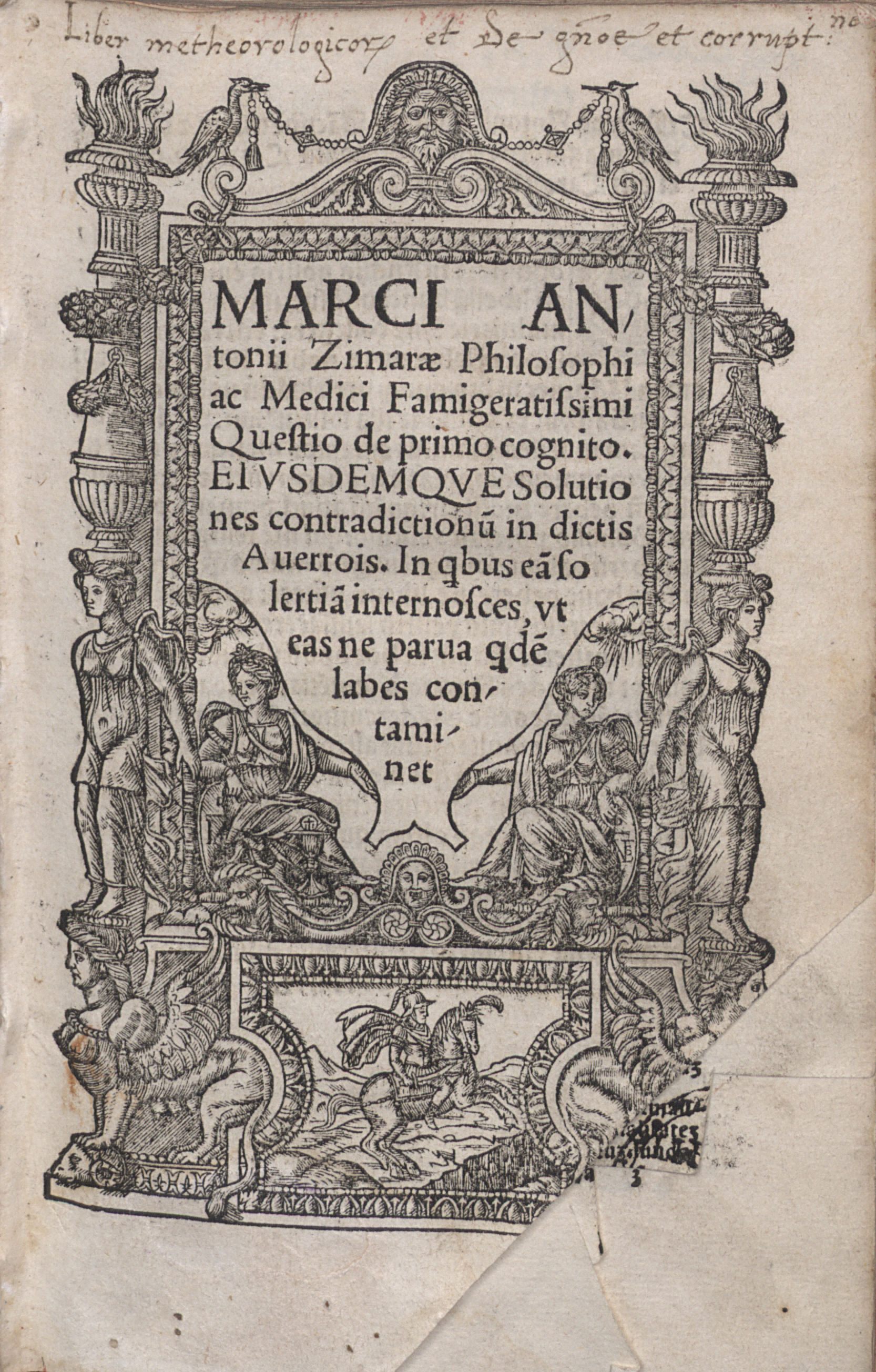
Questio de primo cognito

Marco Antonio Zimara (c. 1460 – 1532), was an Italian Renaissance philosopher.

== Life ==
He was born in Galatina (Lecce) and from 1497 studied philosophy at the University of Padua under Agostino Nifo and Pietro Pomponazzi. He subsequently taught logic while studying medicine at Padua (1501–1505), and in 1509 was appointed professor of natural philosophy. From 1509 to 1518 Zimara lived in San Pietro in Galatina, after which he taught in Salerno (1518–1522), Naples (1522–1523), and again at Padua (1525–1528).

Zimara edited works by medieval philosophers (notably Albertus Magnus) and is known for publishing Aristotle's and Averroës' works with commentaries during his lifetime. His Tabula dilucidationum in dictis Aristotelis et Averrois (1537), became the principal scholarly tool for searching the works of Aristotle and Averroës.

== Bibliography ==
- Blackwell, Constance (2004). "Thomas Aquinas against the Scotists and Platonists. The definition of ens: Cajetano, Zimara, Pererio, 1495-1576". Verbum. Acta Neolatina. 6: 179–188. doi:10.1556/verb.6.2004.1.14.
- Bianchi, Luca (1998). ""Rusticus mendax": Marcantonio Zimara e la fortuna di Alberto Magno nel Rinascimento italiano". Freiburger Zeitschrift für Philosophie und Theologie. 45: 264–278.
- Corvino, Francesco (1960). "Le lezioni di Marco Antonio Zimara "In Primum Posteriorum"". Aristotelismo padovano e filosofia aristotelica. Atti del Congresso internazionale di filosofia, Venezia, 12-18 settembre 1958. Florence: Sansoni. pp. 41–51.
- Antonaci, Antonio (1971). Ricerche sull'aristotelismo del rinascimento. Marcantonio Zimara. Lecce/Galatina: Editrice Salentina.
