= John Versor =

John Versor (Latin: Johannes Versoris, French: Jean Letourneur) (died c.1485) was a French Dominican, known as a Thomist philosopher and commentator on Aristotle.

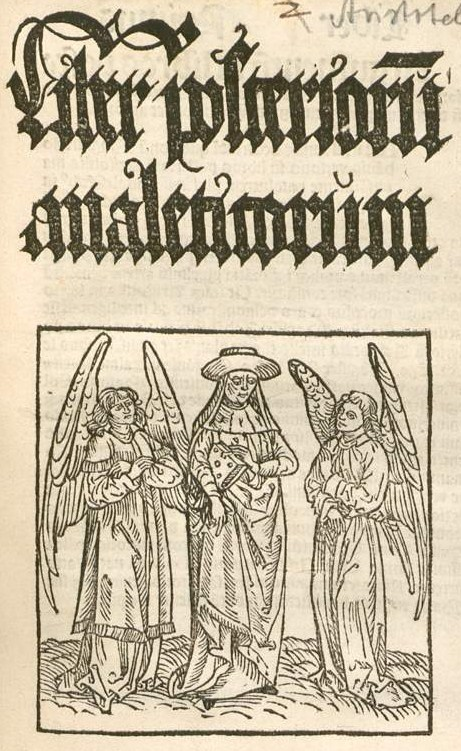
Title page from 1499 of a commentary by John Versor on the Posterior analytics of Aristotle

He was Rector of the University of Paris in 1458.

== Works ==
Though traditionally Versor has often been considered a Thomist, more recent studies show his dependence on both Thomas Aquinas and Albert the Great, and evidence suggests that, by his contemporaries, Versor was regarded as an authority of his own. Insofar as he can be regarded as a Thomist, his position represents an interesting, pre-Cajetan version of Thomism. His commentaries covered most of the works of Aristotle, and his textbooks were very widely circulated in the period 1470 to 1520.

A large part of his questions on Aristotle and Aquinas was translated into Hebrew by Elijah ben Joseph Habillo, during the 1470s. Questions on Aristotle were printed in a number of editions at Cologne, from 1485 onwards.

- Questiones magistri Johannis Versoris super Metaphysicam Aristotelis cum textu eiusdem, 1494 : exemplaire numérisé par les Facultés Loyola Paris accessible en ligne
