= Gaetano da Thiene (philosopher) =

Italian Renaissance philosopher (1387–1465)

Gaetano da Thiene (1387–1465) was an Italian Renaissance philosopher and physician who lived in Padua. He was born in Gaeta and died in Padua.

== Biography ==
A student of Paul of Venice, Gaetano, like his teacher, held an Averroist interpretation of Aristotle's teachings. He worked towards a compromise between that position and Christian doctrines on the personal immortality of the soul, and in later life he abandoned Averroism entirely.

He was one of Paul of Venice's successors as professor of natural philosophy at the University of Padua, and in turn, Nicoletto Vernia, who succeeded to the same position on Gaetano's death, was one of his pupils. Among his pupils was also Pietro Roccabonella, a well known professor of medicine in Padua.

He should not be confused with Saint Cajetan.
