= Paulus Vallius =

Italian Jesuit logician (1561-1622)

Paulus Vallius (Paolo Valla, Paulus Valla, Paulus de la Valle, Paulus de Valle) (1561-1622) was an Italian Jesuit logician.

== Life ==
He was born in Rome.

He was a lecturer at the Collegio Romano in the 1580s. He first taught De elementis, from 1585 to 1587, and then the three-year philosophy course from 1587 to 1590. After that he taught at Padua.

His notes on the Posterior Analytics, generally Thomist, were used by Galileo. This occurred around 1588-1590, and it was through Vallius that Galileo learned the work of Jacopo Zabarella. It is now accepted that Vallius is the source of two logical treatises by Galileo.

Vallius was plagiarized by Ludovico Carbone, in his 1597 Additamenta ad commentaria doctoris Francisci Toleti in logicam Aristotelis, which were Additions to the logic of Franciscus Toletus.

== Works ==
He published Logica, in two volumes, at Lyon in 1622. In it he sided with Benedictus Pereyra against Giuseppe Biancani. The issue was mathematical proof in physics, where Pereyra denied mathematics an essential status.
