= Petrus Martinez de Osma =

Spanish theologian and philosopher

Petrus Martinez de Osma (Spanish: Pedro Martínez de Osma) (died 1480) was a Spanish theologian and philosopher, known for his views on indulgences, which he retracted at the end of his life.

== Life ==
He graduated M.A. at the University of Salamanca in 1457. He was professor of theology there from 1463. A follower of Alonso el Madrigal (el Tostado), from 1476 he defended theses on indulgences and confession resembling those of John Wyclif and Jan Hus, and anticipating issues from the Protestant Reformation. Among his pupils was Antonio de Nebrija.

The views of Martinez encountered opposition, particularly from Juan López de Salamanca. In 1478, as the Spanish Inquisition was being instituted, the Inquisition of Saragossa passed judgement, Martinez was summoned in 1479 before Alfonso Carillo de Acuña, archbishop of Toledo, and other theologians. His ideas were declared heretical, a judgement backed by a papal bull of Pope Sixtus IV. After his views were condemned, the book De confessione, written by Martinez on the occasion of the plenary indulgence of 1475, was burned; and he submitted.

Martinez died at Alba de Tormes in April 1480.

== Works ==
In Martinez Thomism was combined with Renaissance humanism; he opposed the philosophical style of nominalism. He wrote commentaries on ethics and metaphysics. Martinez, through also his follower Diego de Deza, reformed the Salamanca syllabus to include Aristotelian physics and metaphysics, and influenced teaching at Seville.

- Ricardo García Villoslada - Bernardino Llorca, Historia de la Iglesia Católica, vol. III: Edad Nueva, BAC, Madrid 2005, ISBN 84-7914-394-0
- Santiago-Otero, Horacio y Reinhardt, Klaus, Pedro Martínez de Osma y el método teológico: edición de varios escritos inéditos, CSIC, Madrid-Soria 1987
- Santiago Galán, El tratado musical de Pedro Martínez de Osma, un testimonio recuperado del siglo XV, Cuadernos de música iberoamericana, 30, 2017, ISSN 1136-5536
