= John Argyropoulos =

15th-century Greek scholar

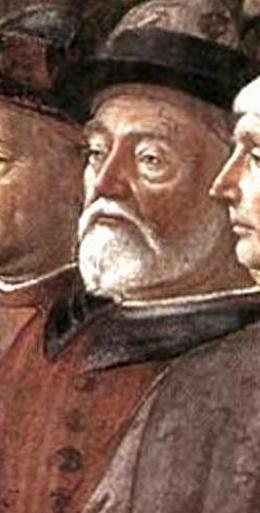
- John Argyropoulos as depicted by Domenico Ghirlandaio in 1481 in the Vocation of the Apostles fresco in the Sistine Chapel, Rome
- Born: Ioannis Argyropoulos c. 1415; Constantinople, Byzantine Empire (modern-day Istanbul, Turkey)
- Died: 26 June 1487; Florence, Republic of Florence (modern-day Italy)

Education
- Education: University of Padua (Theol. Dr., 1444)

Philosophical work
- Era: Renaissance philosophy
- Region: Western philosophy
- School: Renaissance philosophy Aristotelianism
- Institutions: University of Constantinople (1448–1452); Neoplatonic Florentine Academy (1456–70)
- Main interests: Rhetoric, theology

John Argyropoulos (/ɑːrdʒɪˈrɒpələs/; Greek: Ἰωάννης Ἀργυρόπουλος Ioannis Argyropoulos; Italian: Giovanni Argiropulo; surname also spelt Argyropulus, or Argyropulos, or Argyropulo; c. 1415 – 26 June 1487) was a lecturer, philosopher, and humanist, one of the émigré Greek scholars who pioneered the revival of classical Greek learning in 15th century Italy.

He translated Greek philosophical and theological works into Latin besides producing rhetorical and theological works of his own. He was in Italy for the Council of Florence during 1439–1444, and returned to Italy following the Fall of Constantinople, teaching in Florence (at the Florentine Studium) in 1456–1470 and in Rome in 1471–1487.

== Biography ==
John Argyropoulos was born c. 1415 in Constantinople where he studied theology and philosophy. As a teacher in Constantinople, Argyropoulos had amongst his pupils the scholar Constantine Lascaris. He was an official in the service of one of the rulers of the Byzantine Morea and in 1439 was a member of the Byzantine delegation to the Council of Florence, when they accepted Catholicism and abjured Greek Orthodoxy.

In 1443/4, he received a Doctor of Theology degree from the University of Padua before returning to Constantinople. When the city fell in 1453, he left for the still autonomous Despotate of the Morea in the Peloponnese. In 1456, he escaped as a fugitive from Ottoman justice in Italy, where he worked as a teacher in the revival of Greek philosophy as head of the Greek department at Florence's Florentine Studium.

In 1471, on the outbreak of the plague, he moved to Rome, where he continued to act as a teacher of Greek until his death. His students included Pietro de' Medici, Lorenzo de' Medici, Angelo Poliziano, Johann Reuchlin, Jacques Lefèvre d'Étaples and, allegedly, Leonardo da Vinci, although no primary source verifies this claim.

He also made efforts to transport Greek philosophy to Western Europe by leaving a number of Latin translations, including many of Aristotle's works. His principal works were translations of the following portions of Aristotle: Categoriae, De Interpretatione, Analytica Posteriora, Physica, De Caelo, De Anima, Metaphysica, Ethica Nicomachea, Politica; and an Expositio Ethicorum Aristotelis. Several of his writings still exist in manuscript.

He died on 26 June 1487 in Florence, supposedly of consuming too much watermelon.

== See also ==
- Greek scholars in the Renaissance
