= Blasius of Parma =

Italian mathematician and astrologer

Biagio Pelacani da Parma; c. 1350 – 1416), known in English as Blasius of Parma, was an Italian philosopher, mathematician and astrologer. He popularised English and French philosophical work in Italy, where he associated both with scholastics and with early Renaissance humanists.

He was professor of mathematics at the University of Padua, where he taught from 1382 to 1388; he taught also at the University of Pavia (1374? to 1378, and again 1389 to 1407), and the University of Bologna (1389 to 1382). His students included Vittorino da Feltre.

== Works ==
Blasius around 1390 wrote a work on perspective; it drew on Alhacen, John Pecham, and Witelo. Filippo Brunelleschi may have known of the work of Blasius through Giovanni dell'Abbaco.

His Tractatus de Ponderibus was based on Oxford theories on laws of motion taken up from the statics of Jordanus Nemorarius, and introduced them into Italy. He disagreed with the views of Thomas Bradwardine on proportion, and gave a proof of the mean speed theorem. He also wrote on the natural philosophy of Aristotle.

== Modern editions ==
- Questiones super tractatus logice magistri Petri Hispani, Paris: Vrin, 2001.
- Quaestiones circa tractatum proportionum magistri Thome Braduardini, Paris: Vrin, 2006.
- Questiones super perspectiva communi, Paris: Vrin, 2009.
