= Nicoletto Vernia =

Italian philosopher (c. 1420 - 1499)

Nicoletto Vernia (c. 1420, in Chieti – October 31, 1499, in Vicenza) was an Italian Averroist philosopher, at the University of Padua.

== Life ==
He studied at Pavia, under Paolo da Pergola in Venice, and with Gaetano da Thiene in Padua, graduating with a doctorate in 1458. His first work was on the unitas intellectus, the theory of Averroes on the unity of the soul and intellect.

In natural philosophy he posed the question of the scope of the subject. Following Averroes, he took “mobile being” as the topic, against the scholastic views of Antonius Andreas and John Canonicus. Pietro Barozzi, Bishop of Padua, in 1489 issued a decree limiting academic discussion, and Vernia had to withdraw from his position. He wrote against Averroes, in Contra perversam Averrois opinionem, attacking his views on the immortality of the soul and the unity of the intellect.

His students included Agostino Nifo and Pietro Pomponazzi. Both Vernia and Nifo changed allegiance from Averroes to the interpretations of Aristotle in certain Greek commentators, one of whom, Themistius, was being translated by Ermolao Barbaro, a colleague at Padua. As time went on, the commentary On the Soul by Alexander of Aphrodisias was translated into Latin, by Girolamo Donato, and a translation of the commentary attributed to Simplicius was also circulated. Vernia's views of the correct interpretation of Aristotle modified in the light of access to these fresh opinions.
