= David Cranston (philosopher) =

Scottish scholastic philosopher and theologian

David Cranston or Cranstoun (c. 1480–1512) was a Scottish scholastic philosopher and theologian in the circle of John Mair.

== Biography ==
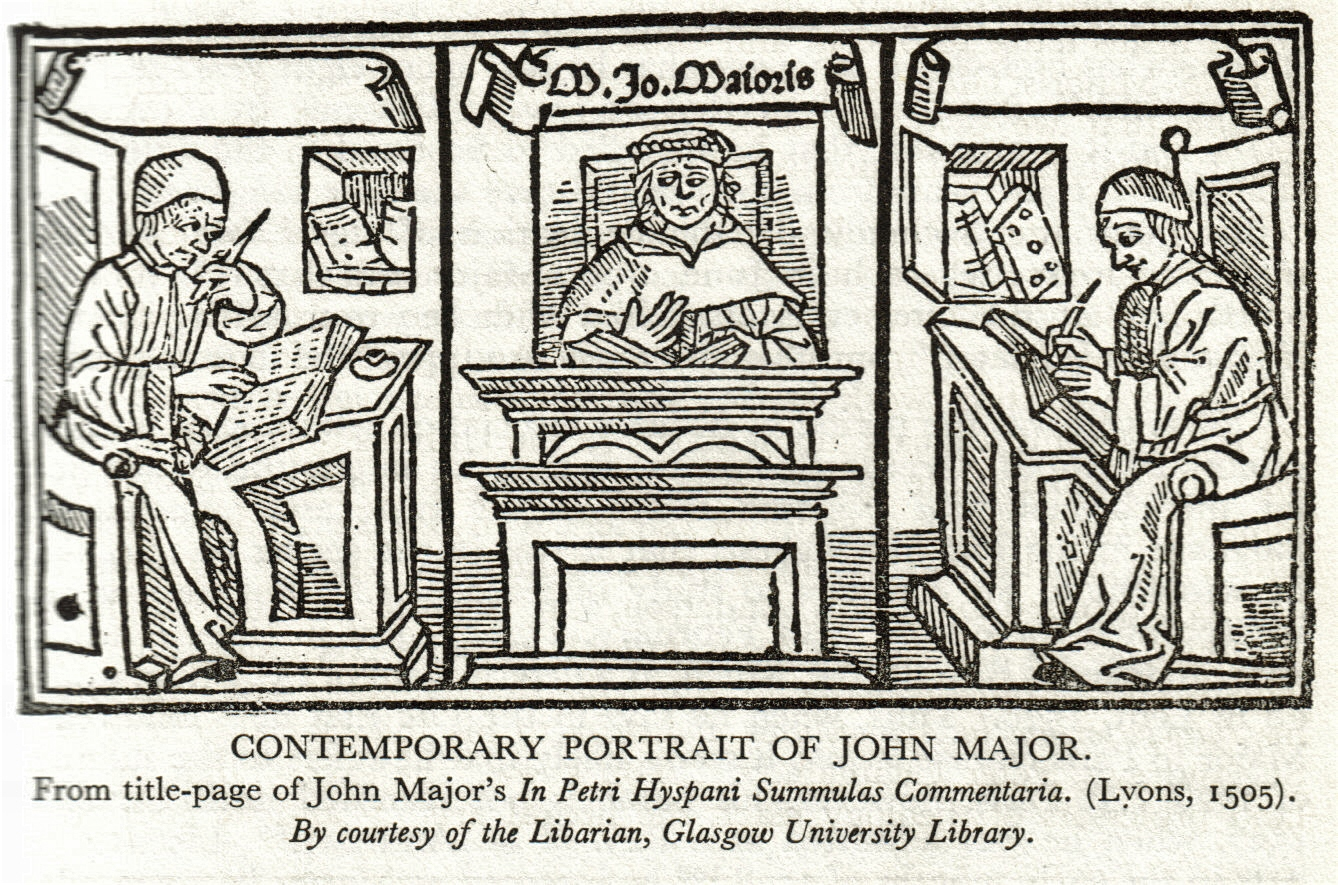
Cranston was a prominent member of the circle of John Mair, shown here in a contemporary woodcut.

Cranston was certainly born in Scotland, possibly in the diocese of Glasgow, c. 1480; nothing else is known of his early life. The first record of him comes when he matriculated from the University of Paris in 1495, attending the Collège de Montaigu. He had access to a healthy supply of money during his time at the university, though he indicates in his will he was a "poor student". At the college, Cranston was a student of Scottish philosopher John Mair.

Cranston graduated with an MA in 1499. He subsequently worked as an instructor in arts at the college; among his pupils was the fellow Scotsman and pupil of Mair, George Lokert. At this time, he also undertook a course in theology. The first fruit of this study was published in 1500 as Positiones phisicales. Cranston next published a set of Questiones on Aristotle's Prior Analytics in 1506, which he dedicated to the first Archbishop of Glasgow, Robert Blackadder. Cranston also edited Mair's Termini (1502) and the Quartus Sententiarum (1509), the second edition (1503) of the former containing his own additions. He was apparently among the pupils who urged Mair to issue the many textbooks in logic he did at the University of Paris, which were ultimately collated together in one volume in 1506.

According to biographer J. H. Burns, by 1506 Cranston was "a prominent member of the circle around Mair", who together played a large part in reviving scholastic philosophy in the early 16th century. As Alexander Broadie put it, "Cranston was in many ways close to Mair, particularly in respect to their deep commitment to the scholastic tradition in logic and theology." Cranston was a diligent defender of scholastic philosophy against the criticism of humanist philosophers. In 1510, Mair transcribed and published a dialogue between Cranston and the young aristocrat and poet Gavin Douglas, in which Cranston gives a potent defense of Mair's scholasticism against the humanist scepticism of Douglas. But, like his teacher, Cranston maintained an open mind around humanism. Both were happy to attend humanist scholar Girolamo Aleandro's lectures on Ancient Greek at the university, which introduced the language to the Paris; Aleandro later credited Cranston among his "most faithful auditors" and "illustrious friends" in France.

In 1506, Cranston published another theological work, the Tractatus noticiarum. According to Burns, this work demonstrates Cranston's lifelong "preponderant theological interest" in human activity. He thus analyses the truth of religious faith, which he judges to be decided upon by "inevident assent"—in which the truth of a proposition is not immediately obvious to the intellect, but must rather be accepted on God's authority. By May 1512, Cranston had finished his education in theology and took his doctorate. His subsequent works show a preoccupation with moral philosophy; he made major additions to the Questiones morales of Martin Le Maistre and minor ones to the Moralia of Jacques Almain, a peer at the university.

In August 1512, two versions of Cranston's Insolubilia were printed. This treatise concerned unsolvable problems and the logical rules of disputations. However, the second of these was published with an elegy De immatura magistri nostri Davidis Cranston Scoti morte [On the premature death of our master David Cranston the Scot], indicating Cranston had died during the treatise's publication. Thus, Cranston died between 7 and 14 August 1512, a premature death while he was only in his early to mid-thirties. Cranston had apparently suffered poor health through his course in theology. He left 450 livres tournois for a scholarship to the Collège de Montaigu. Cranston was buried in the chapel of the Collège de Montaigu, beside his former principal at the college Jan Standonck.

== Character ==
Cranston was apparently prone to anger, especially when defending his home nation. Mair's 1521 History of Greater Britain records an episode where the Continental theologians Almain and Pieter Crockaert teased Cranston in the Sorbonne over his nation's diet of oat bread, which he "strove to deny as an insult to his native country". In a similar bout of patriotic anger, a brief intermission between the dry philosophical discourse of the Questiones is afforded when Cranston attempts to discredit a passage in Jerome, which describes cannibalism among the Scots, as owing to a corrupted manuscript of the original.

== Sources ==
- Broadie, Alexander (1983). George Lokert, Late-Scholastic Logician. Edinburgh University Press. ISBN 9780852244692. OCLC 876518458.
- Broadie, Alexander (2009a). A History of Scottish Philosophy. Edinburgh University Press. ISBN 978-0-7486-1628-2.
- Broadie, Alexander (2009b). "The Context of John Mair's Dialogus de Materia Theologo Tractanda". In MacDonald, Alasdair A.; von Martels, Zeder R. W. M.; Veenstra, Jan R. (eds.). Christian Humanism: Essays in Honour of Arjo Vanderjagt. Brill Publishers. pp. 419–431. ISBN 978-90-47-42975-3.
- Burns, J. H. (23 September 2004). "Cranston, David (c. 1480–1512), philosopher and theologian". Oxford Dictionary of National Biography (online ed.). Oxford University Press. doi:10.1093/ref:odnb/6616. (Subscription or UK public library membership required.)
- Fitzpatrick, F. J. (Spring 1993). "Review: The Tradition of Scottish Philosophy: A New Perspective on the Enlightenment by Alexander Broadie". The Innes Review. XLIV (1): 100–104. doi:10.3366/inr.1993.44.1.100.
