= Petrus Sutor =

French theologian and Carthusian monk

Petrus Sutor (French: Pierre Cousturier; c. 1475–1480 – 18 June 1537) was a French theologian and Carthusian monk.

== Early life and education ==
Born in Chémeré-le-Roi, he studied arts at the Collège Sainte-Barbe in Paris from about 1490, earned his M.A. in 1495, and taught arts there while studying theology. In 1502 he became a fellow of the College of Sorbonne, where he served as proctor, librarian and prior. He received a licence in theology on 5 February 1510 and doctorate on 16 April 1510.

He was formed in the reform-minded Paris milieu of Jan Standonck and the Collège de Montaigu, and closely associated with the theologian Natalis Beda. In January 1511, he gave up the parish of Saint-Loyer in the diocese of Sées, a student benefice he had held since 1509, and entered the Carthusian house of Vauvert in Paris.

He was successively prior of four Carthusian houses: Val-Dieu (from 1514), Vauvert (from 1517), Preize near Troyes (c. 1519–1523), and Notre-Dame-du-Parc (by 1531). He died at Notre-Dame-du-Parc on 18 June 1537.

== Translation critic ==
Sutor is known for being an outspoken critic of Erasmus, Martin Luther, and Protestantism more generally. In his 1525 work De tralatione Bibliae ("On the Translation of the Bible"), he defended the sufficiency of St. Jerome's Latin Vulgate and attacked the new Latin translations of Erasmus and Lefèvre d'Étaples while also condemning the translation of the Bible into vernacular languages. He "considered it sufficient that the people could recite the Lord's Prayer, the Decalogue, the Creed and the Commandments of the Church."

Erasmus replied with Apologia adversus debacchationem Petri Sutoris (1525); Sutor answered with the Antapologia (1526), and Erasmus responded with an Appendix (1526). In 1526, Sutor urged the Parlement of Paris, which had just banned vernacular translations, to condemn new Latin translations as well, which he considered the greater danger.

== Works ==
- De vita cartusiana libri duo [On the Carthusian Life, in Two Books] (Paris, 1522; Louvain, 1572; Cologne, 1609)
- De triplici connubio divae Annae disceptatio [A Disputation on the Threefold Marriage of St. Anne] (Paris, 1523)
- De tralatione Bibliae et novarum reprobatione interpretationum [On the Translation of the Bible and the Rejection of New Interpretations] (Paris, 1525)
- Apologeticum in novos Anticomaritas, praeclaris beatissimae Virginis Mariae laudibus detrahentes [A Defense against the New Anticomarites, Who Detract from the Praises of the Most Blessed Virgin Mary] (Paris, 1526)
- Antapologia ... in quandam Erasmi apologiam [Counter-Apology against a Certain Apologia of Erasmus] (Paris, 1526)
- La manière de faire testament très salutaire [The Manner of Making a Very Beneficial Testament] (Paris, c. 1529)
- Apologia ... in damnatam Lutheri haeresim de votis monasticis [A Defense against the Condemned Heresy of Luther concerning Monastic Vows] (Paris, 1531)
- De potestate ecclesiae in occultis [On the Power of the Church in Hidden Matters] (Paris, 1534; 1546)

== See also ==
- Erasmus
- Jacques Lefèvre d'Étaples
- Translation of the Bible
- Humanism
- Scholasticism
