= Diogo de Gouveia =

Portuguese teacher and theologian

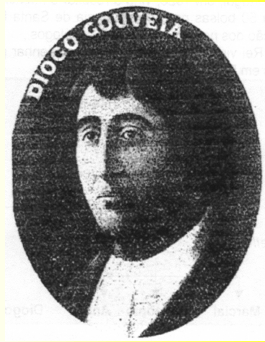
- Born: c. 1471; Beja, Kingdom of Portugal
- Died: 8 December 1557; Lisbon, Kingdom of Portugal
- Occupations: Teacher, theologian, diplomat and humanist

Diogo de Gouveia (c. 1471, Beja - 8 December 1557, Lisbon), known as Diogo de Gouveia, the Elder to distinguish him from contemporary homonyms such as his nephew, was a leading Portuguese teacher, theologian, diplomat and humanist during the Renaissance. With an extensive academic curriculum as rector at the University of Paris, he served King Manuel I and king John III of Portugal, whom he advised on the creation of captaincies in Brazil and the coming of the first Jesuit missionaries and notably Francis Xavier. First of a lineage of distinguished humanists and educators, he was the uncle of André de Gouveia, António de Gouveia, Diogo de Gouveia "the younger", and Marcial de Gouveia. During the Counter-Reformation he was a strong supporter of scholastic and Catholic orthodoxy, clashing with the liberal views of his nephew André de Gouveia.

== Biography ==
Diogo de Gouveia was born in Beja. He was the son of Antão de Gouveia, who had settled there. In 1499 Diogo became one of the first Portuguese to study in Paris, at the Collège de Montaigu, benefiting from two scholarships offered by Jan Standonck to King Manuel I as compensation for an attack by French privateers on a Portuguese ship. He studied at the University of Paris, where he became Master of Arts. Ordained priest, he completed the studies at the Sorbonne where, in 1507 he became librarian, having graduated as Doctor of Theology on April 29, 1510. From 1512 to 1521 he was a diplomatic agent of king Manuel I in France, attending complaints from owners of Portuguese ships targeted by privateers.

In 1520 he had the idea of buying the Parisian Collège Sainte-Barbe for the king. Faced with the difficulties posed by owner Robert Dugast, the college was rented and Diogo de Gouveia became its principal, transforming it into a real Portuguese college inside the University of Paris. When king John III was enthroned, he wanted to shape education to match the growing demands of the vast territories ruled by the Portuguese. In 1526, at suggestion of Diogo de Gouveia, he created more than 50 scholarships for Portuguese students in Paris, in order to prepare them in the liberal arts, to be followed by studies in theology. Among these students were André de Gouveia and Diogo de Teive, who came to Sainte-Barbe in 1527.

There studied mainly Portuguese but also the navarrese Francis Xavier in 1525, and Ignatius of Loyola, who listed in the college already at 33, on the grounds of not exerting his influence on his classmates. In 1529, having learned that Loyola had been monopolising attention over school, a furious Gouveia threatened to hit him, in an episode that became famous. That same year George Buchanan became teacher in Saint Barbe.

As an advisor to D. John III, Diogo de Gouveia reported the king in September 1527 about Giovanni da Verrazzano's moves in the Atlantic, of what his letters are a relevant testimony. In 1532 to counter the growing advances of French privateers in Brazilian shores, he suggested along with Cristóvão Jacques, the introduction of Captaincies in Brazil

Between 1529 and 1534, due to his frequent travels, he entrusted André de Gouveia with the direction of the College of Saint Barbe, who opened it to humanist reform ideas, inviting Nicolas Cop to teach there. After Cop's contested inaugural address November 1533, André went to the College of Guienne in Bordeaux and was replaced by Diogo de Gouveia the younger.

In 1537 Diogo de Gouveia held diplomatic missions in France on behalf of D. John III. A year later he wrote to the king enthusiastically endorsing the newly graduated clerics of Saint Barbe to the missions in Asia. After engaging in the papal approval of the Society of Jesus, he followed the evolution of the Jesuit missions abroad through the reports of Diogo de Gouveia, the younger.

From 1540 to 1548 he returned to the rectorship of Saint Barbe, as his nephews traveled to Portugal. He was then in a difficult position, as king John III threatened to end Portuguese scholarships abroad, while engaging in founding a college for liberal arts in Portugal, in order to prepare in Portugal prospective college students, sheltered from north European Protestant Reformation struggles. In 1542 the king founded the Royal College of Arts and Humanities at Coimbra. As he appointed André de Gouveia, who had excelled as principal of the College of Guienne, in Bordeaux. Diogo de Gouveia opposed it, accusing his nephew of Lutheranism, preferring Diogo de Gouveia, the younger with whose reports he had taken solace.

As the Royal College of Arts and Humanities at Coimbra surpassed Saint Barbe as the main Portuguese student's destination, in subsequent years Parisian and Bordalese factions of teachers fought within the university.

Diogo de Gouveia returned to Portugal in 1556, where he became Canon of Lisbon Cathedral, having died the following year. He was buried in the crossing of the cathedral, the now lost epitaph in his tombstone, can be translated as:

Here lies Diogo Gouvea Doctor in Theology and rector of the University of Paris, Canon in this Holy See, who served five kings of Portugal and four of France and attended and negotiated for the good of faith and honour of this Kingdom. He died the 8th day of December 1557.
