= George Buchanan =

Scottish historian and humanist scholar (1506–1582)

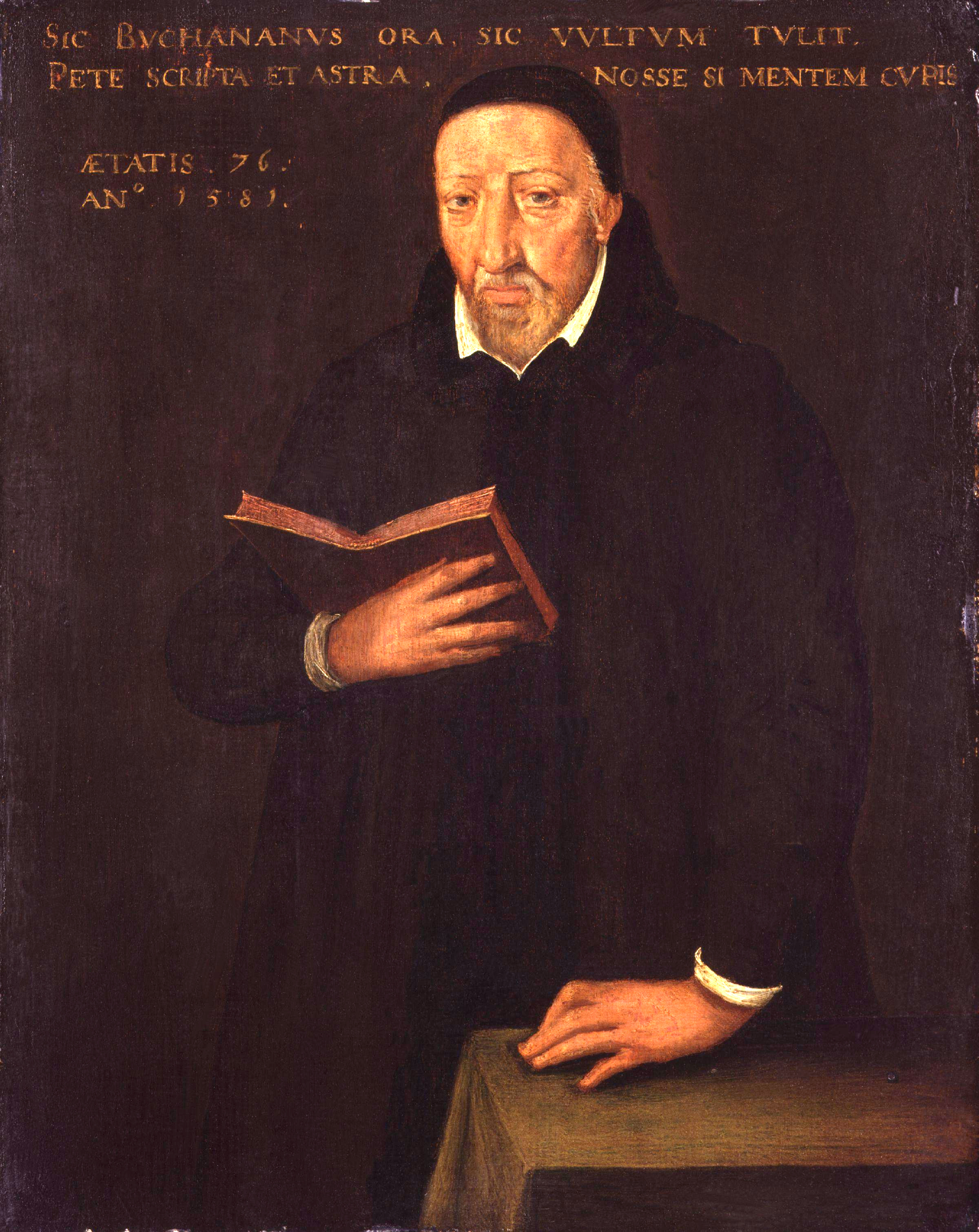
- George Buchanan by A Bronckorst, 1581 (National Gallery of Scotland)
- Born: February 1506; Killearn, Stirlingshire, Scotland
- Died: 28 September 1582 (aged 76); Edinburgh, Scotland
- Education: University of St Andrews (B.A.); University of Paris (M.A.)
- Occupations: historian, scholar

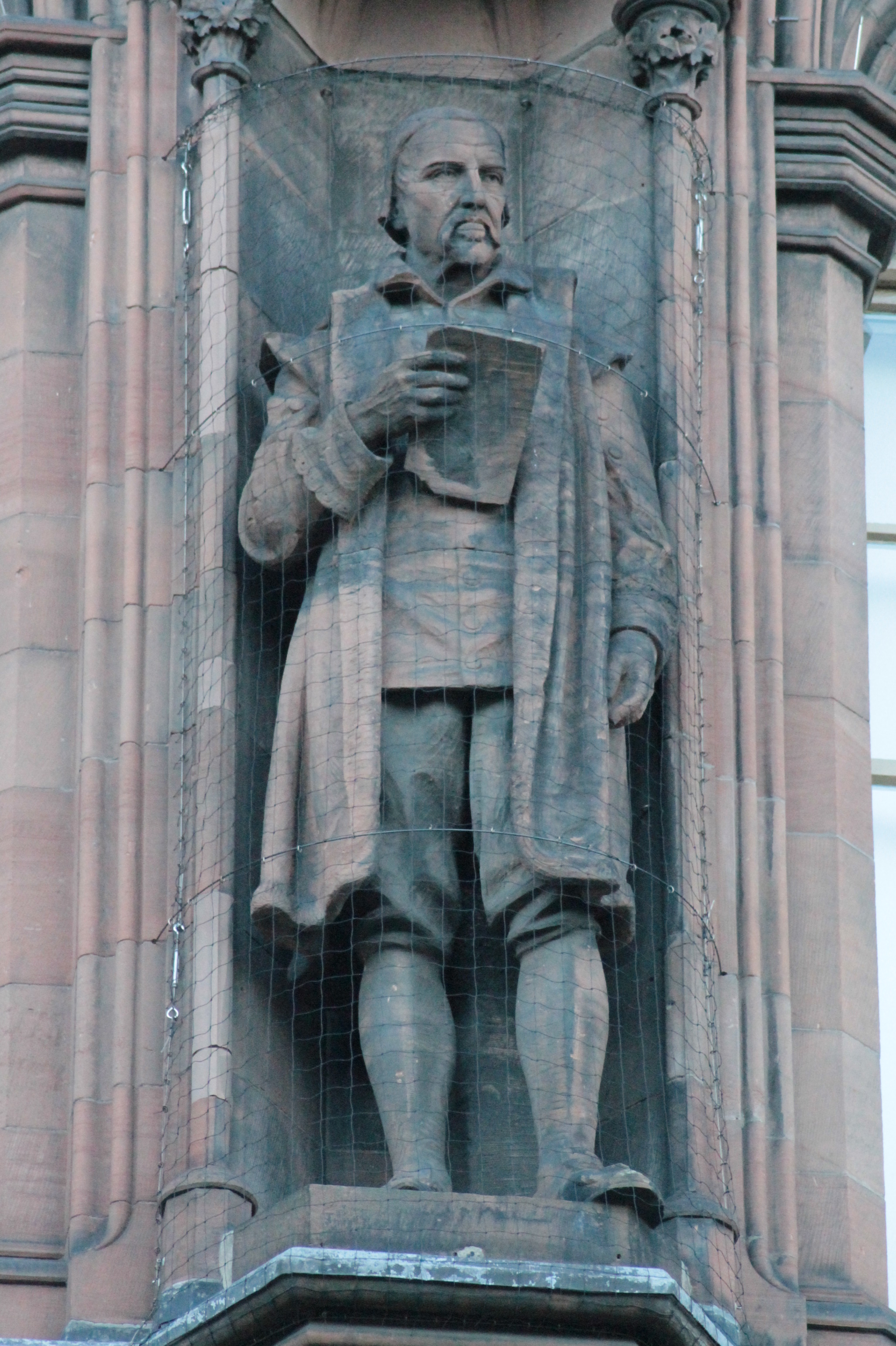
Statue of George Buchanan, Scottish National Portrait Gallery

George Buchanan (Scottish Gaelic: Seòras Bochanan; February 1506 – 28 September 1582) was a Scottish historian and humanist scholar. According to historian Keith Brown, Buchanan was "the most profound intellectual sixteenth-century Scotland produced." His ideology of resistance to royal usurpation gained widespread acceptance during the Scottish Reformation. Brown says the ease with which King James VII was deposed in 1689 shows the power of Buchananite ideas.

The 31-metre-high (101 ft 8 in) Buchanan Monument in Killearn commemorates his nearby birthplace.

His treatise De Jure Regni apud Scotos, published in 1579, discussed the doctrine that the source of all political power is the people, and that the king is bound by those conditions under which the supreme power was first committed to his hands, and that it is lawful to resist, even to punish, tyrants. The importance of Buchanan's writings is shown by the suppression of his work by James VI and the British legislatures in the century following their publication. It was condemned by an act of Parliament, the Treason (No. 2) Act 1584 (May c. 8 (S)), and burned by the University of Oxford in 1664 and 1683.

== Early life ==
=== Early upbringing and education in Paris ===
His father, a Highlander and a younger son of the old Buchanan family of Drumakill, owned the farm of Moss, in the parish of Killearn, Stirlingshire, but he died young, leaving his widow, five sons, and three daughters in poverty. George's mother, Agnes Heriot, was of the family of the Heriots of Trabroun, East Lothian, of which George Heriot, founder of Heriot's Hospital, was also a member. Buchanan, a native speaker of Scottish Gaelic, is said to have attended Killearn school, but not much is known of his early education. His brother, Patrick Buchanan, was also a scholar.

In 1520, he was sent by his uncle, James Heriot, to the University of Paris, where he first came in contact with the two great influences of the age, the Renaissance and the Reformation. There, according to him, he devoted himself to the writing of verses "partly by liking, partly by compulsion (that being then the one task prescribed to youth)".

=== Return to Scotland ===
In 1522 his uncle died, and George Buchanan, who was at that time severely ill, was unable to stay in Paris and returned to Scotland. After recovering from his illness, he joined the French auxiliaries who had been brought over to Scotland by John Stewart, Duke of Albany, and took part in an unsuccessful siege of Wark Castle on the border with England in late 1523. In the following year he entered the University of St Andrews, where he graduated B.A. in 1525. He had gone there mainly to attend the lectures of John Mair on logic; and when Mair moved to Paris, Buchanan followed him in 1526.

=== Professor and Procurator ===
In 1528 Buchanan graduated M.A. at Scots College, University of Paris. The next year he was appointed regent, or professor, in the College of Sainte-Barbe, and taught there for over three years. Sainte-Barbe was one of the most prestigious and advanced colleges at that time. George added to that prestige by creating new reforms in teaching Latin. In 1529 he was elected "Procurator of the German Nation" in the University of Paris, and was re-elected four times in four successive months. He resigned his regentship in 1531, and in 1532 became tutor to Gilbert Kennedy, 3rd Earl of Cassilis, with whom he returned to Scotland early in 1537 having acquired a great reputation for learning.

=== Theological stance ===
At this period Buchanan assumed the same attitude toward the Catholic Church as Erasmus: he did not repudiate its doctrines, but considered himself free to criticise its practice. Though he listened to the arguments of the Protestant Reformers, he did not join their ranks until 1553. His first literary production in Scotland, when he was in Lord Cassilis's household in the west country, was the poem Somnium, a satirical attack on the Franciscan friars and the monastic life generally. This assault on the monks was not displeasing to James V, who engaged Buchanan as tutor to one of his natural sons, James Stewart (not the son who was afterwards regent), and encouraged him in a more daring effort. The poems Palinodia and Franciscanus et Fratres remained unpublished for many years, but made the author hated by the Franciscan order.

== Humanist in exile ==
=== Arrest, escape and relocation ===
In 1539 there was persecution in Scotland of the Lutherans, and Buchanan among others was arrested. Although the King had withheld his protection, Buchanan managed to escape and made his way to London, and then Paris. In Paris, however, he found himself in danger when his main enemy, Cardinal David Beaton, arrived there as ambassador, and on the invitation of André de Gouveia, he moved to Bordeaux. Gouveia was then principal of the newly founded College of Guienne, and by his influence Buchanan was appointed professor of Latin. During his time there several of his major works, the translations of Medea and Alcestis, and the two dramas, Jephthes, sive Votum and Baptistes (sive Calumnia), were completed.

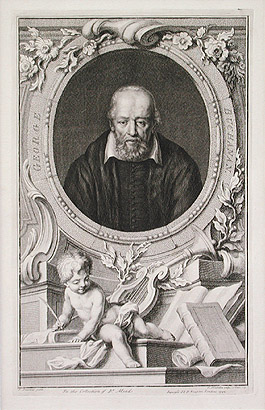
Buchanan, original engraving by Jacobus Houbraken

Michel de Montaigne was Buchanan's pupil at Bordeaux and acted in his tragedies. In the essay Of Presumption he classes Buchanan with Jean Dorat, Theodore Beza, Michel de l'Hôpital, Pierre de Montdoré and Adrianus Turnebus, as one of the foremost Latin poets of his time. Here also Buchanan formed a lasting friendship with Julius Caesar Scaliger; in later life he won the admiration of Joseph Scaliger, who wrote an epigram on Buchanan which contains the couplet, famous in its day: "Imperii fuerat Romani Scotia limes; Romani eloquii Scotia limes erit?" Austin Seal and Steve Philp translate this as: 'Just as Scotland was at the apex of the Roman Empire, so Scotland shall be at the apex of Roman eloquence'. (Not only is Buchanan's Latin scholarship extolled, a congratulatory reference to Scotland retaining Scottish law – quintessentially an improved version of Roman law – as the foundation of its legal system is also implied.)

=== Return to Paris ===
In 1542 or 1543 he returned to Paris, and in 1544 he was appointed regent in the Collège du cardinal Lemoine. Among his colleagues were Muretus and Turnebus. Although little is known about George during this time, we can gather that he probably once again fell ill according to an elegy he wrote to his comrades Tastaeus and Tevius.

=== Coimbra ===
In 1547 Buchanan joined the band of French and Portuguese humanists who had been invited by Gouveia to lecture in the Portuguese University of Coimbra. The French mathematician Elie Vinet, and the Portuguese historian, Jerónimo Osório, were among his colleagues; Gouveia, called by Montaigne le plus grand principal de France, was rector of the university, which had reached the summit of its prosperity under the patronage of King John III. But the rectorship had been coveted by Diogo de Gouveia, uncle of André and formerly head of Sainte-Barbe. It is probable that before André's death at the end of 1547 Diogo had urged the Inquisition to investigate him and his staff; up to 1906, when the records of the trial were first published in full, Buchanan's biographers generally attributed the attack to the influence of Cardinal Beaton, the Franciscans, or the Jesuits, and the whole history of Buchanan's residence in Portugal was extremely obscure.

=== Trial and imprisonment ===
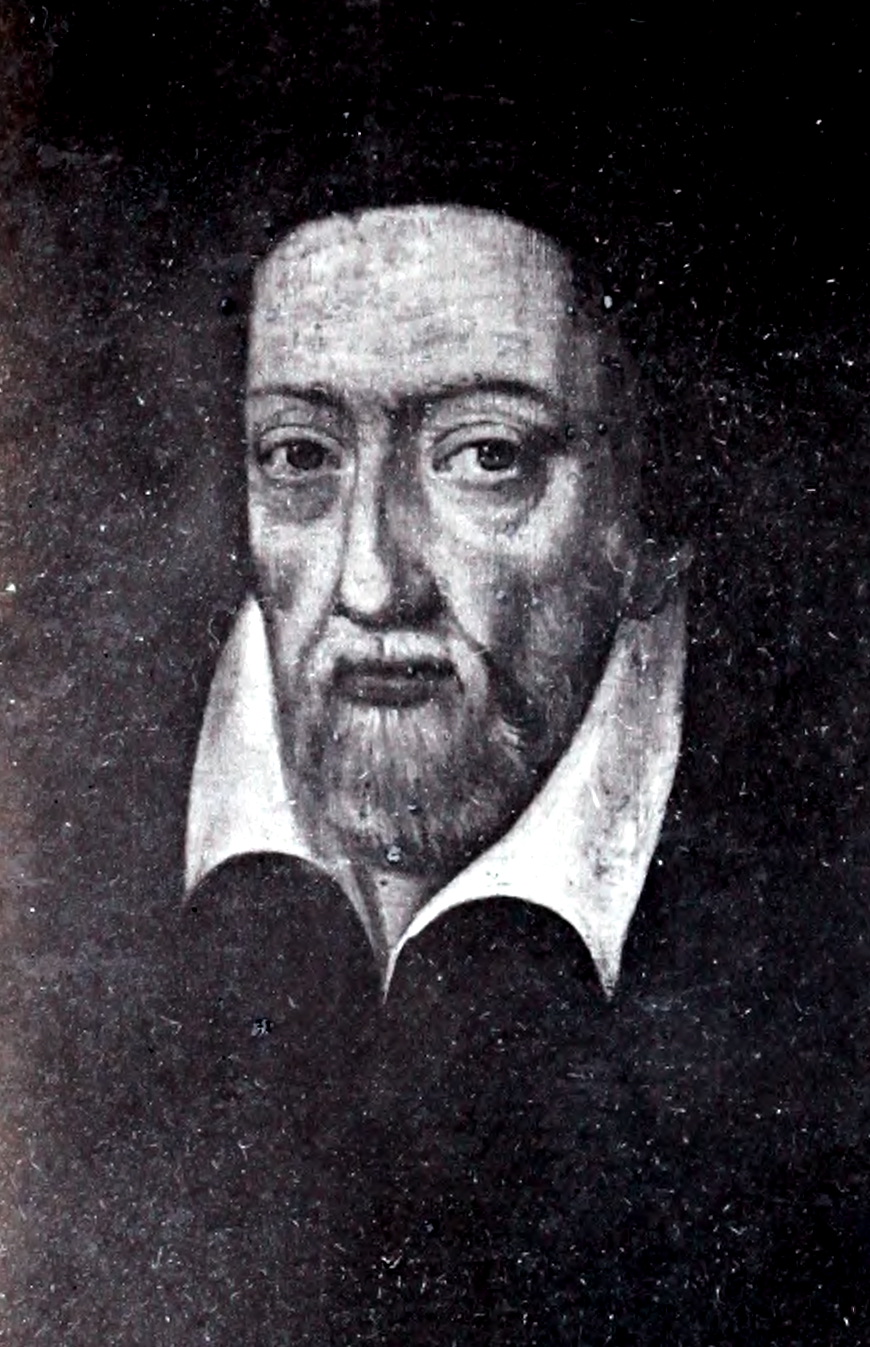
George Buchanan, painter unknown

A commission of inquiry was appointed in October 1549 and reported in June 1550. Buchanan and two Portuguese, Diogo de Teive and João da Costa (who had succeeded to the rectorship), were committed for trial. Teive and Costa were found guilty of various offences against public order, and the evidence shows that there was ample reason for a judicial inquiry. Buchanan was accused of Lutheran and Judaistic practices. He defended himself, admitting that some of the charges were true. About June 1551 he was sentenced to abjure his errors, and to be imprisoned in the monastery of São Bento in Lisbon. Here he listened to edifying discourses from the monks, whom he found "not unkind but ignorant". In his leisure he began to translate the Psalms into Latin verse, completing the greater part of the work.

=== Release ===
After seven months, Buchanan was released on condition that he remain in Lisbon; and on 28 February 1552 this restriction was lifted. Buchanan then sailed for England, but soon made his way to Paris, where in 1553 he was appointed regent in the College of Boncourt. He remained in that post for two years, and then accepted the office of tutor to the son of the Maréchal de Brissac. It was almost certainly during this last stay in France, where Protestantism was being repressed under King Henry II and his son Francis II, that Buchanan took the side of Calvinism.

== Return to Scotland ==
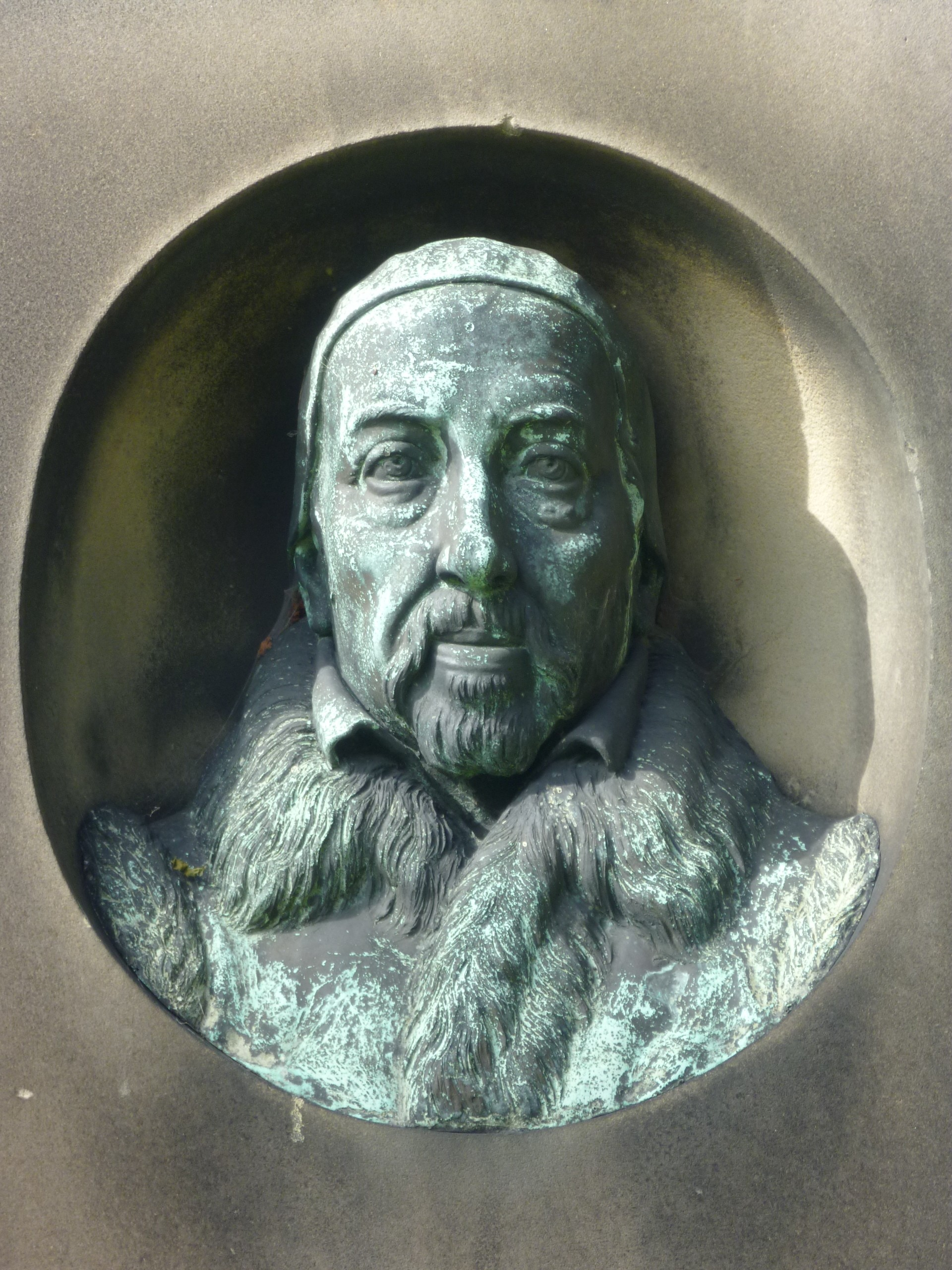
Detail on the Buchanan memorial in Greyfriars Kirkyard, Edinburgh

=== Espousal of Calvinism ===
George Buchanan returned to Scotland in 1560 or 1561. According to the English diplomat Thomas Randolph, in April 1562 Mary, Queen of Scots read Livy with him daily. She gave him a pension of £250 Scots yearly, and an income from the lands of Crossraguel Abbey. Buchanan wrote masques for performance at her wedding to Lord Darnley, known as the Pompae. Buchanan, throughout his support for Renaissance humanism and his strident criticism the vices of them, had always remained a member of the Catholic Church in Scotland, but he now openly joined the Protestant Reformed Church. Even though he had recently received from the Queen the gift of the revenues of Crossraguel Abbey, he sat in the General Assembly of the Church of Scotland from 1563 and in 1566 was appointed principal of St Leonard's College, St Andrews, by the Prince Regent, Earl of Moray. Though a layman, he was made Moderator of the General Assembly of the Church of Scotland in 1567. He was the last lay person to be elected Moderator until Alison Elliot in 2004, the first female Moderator.

=== Tutor and other offices ===
Buchanan accompanied the Regent Moray to England, and his famous Detectio Mariæ Reginæ—a scathing exposure of the Queen's relations to Darnley and the circumstances leading up to his death, published London: John Day, [1571]—was produced to the commissioners at Westminster.

In 1570, after the assassination of Moray, he was appointed one of the preceptors of the young king, and it was through his strict tuition that James VI acquired his scholarship. As the young king's senior tutor, Buchanan subjected James to regular beatings but also instilled in him a lifelong passion for literature and learning. Buchanan sought to turn James into a God-fearing, Protestant king who accepted the limitations of monarchy, as outlined in his treatise De Jure Regni apud Scotos.

While royal tutor he also held other offices: he was for a short time director of chancery, and then became Keeper of the Privy Seal of Scotland, a post which entitled him to a seat in the parliament. He appears to have continued in this office for some years, at least until 1579. John Geddie was his clerk and servant in this role, and copied some of Buchanan's manuscripts.

=== Final years ===
His last years were occupied with completion and publication of two of his major works, De Jure Regni apud Scotos (1579) and Rerum Scoticarum Historia (1582).

He died in his first floor flat on Kennedy's Close (destroyed to build the Tron Kirk in 1637 which was in turn curtailed by the building of modern Hunter Square) in Edinburgh on Friday 28 September 1582 and was buried in Greyfriars Kirkyard on the following day. The grave was originally marked by a through-stone but this had sunk into the ground by 1701. Currently, two memorials in Greyfriars each claim to mark his burial: one just north-west of the church and a second, more modest memorial near the eastmost path. The smaller (later) one is correct.

== Works ==
=== Latin scholar ===
According to the Encyclopædia Britannica Eleventh Edition, "For mastery of the Latin language, Buchanan has seldom been surpassed by any modern writer. His style is not rigidly modelled on that of any classical author, but has a freshness and elasticity of its own. He wrote Latin as if it were his mother tongue." Hugh Trevor-Roper called him "by universal consent, the greatest Latin writer, whether in prose or in verse, in sixteenth century Europe". Buchanan also had a rich vein of poetical feeling, and much originality of thought. His translations of the Psalms and of the Greek plays are more than mere versions; his two tragedies, Baptistes and Jephthes, enjoyed a European reputation for academic excellence. His Pompae verses were written for performance at the court entertainments of Mary, including the Offering of the Rustic Gods sung during a masque devised by Bastian Pagez for the baptism of King James.

=== Prose works ===
In addition to these works, Buchanan wrote in prose Chamaeleon, a satire in Scots against Maitland of Lethington, first printed in 1711; a Latin translation of Linacre's Grammar (Paris, 1533); Libellus de Prosodia (Edinburgh, 1640); and Vita ab ipso scripta biennio ante mortem (1608), edited by R. Sibbald (1702). His other poems are Fratres Fraterrimi, Elegiae, Silvae, two sets of verses entitled Hendecasyllabon Liber and Iambon Liber; three books of Epigrammata; a book of miscellaneous verse; De Sphaera (in five books), suggested by the poem De sphaera mundi of Joannes de Sacrobosco, and intended as a defence of the Ptolemaic theory against the new Copernican view.

There are two early editions of Buchanan's works: Thomas Ruddiman's and Pieter Burman's.

=== Late works ===
The first of his important late works was the treatise De Jure Regni apud Scotos, published in 1579. In this famous work, composed in the form of a dialogue, and evidently intended to instil sound political principles into the mind of his pupil, Buchanan lays down the doctrine that the source of all political power is the people, that the king is bound by those conditions under which the supreme power was first committed to his hands, and that it is lawful to resist, even to punish, tyrants. The importance of the work is proved by the persistent efforts of the legislature to suppress it during the century following its publication. It was condemned by act of parliament in 1584, and again in 1664; and in 1683 it was burned by the University of Oxford.

The second of his larger works is the History of Scotland, Rerum Scoticarum Historia, completed shortly before his death, and published in 1582. It is remarkable for the power and richness of its style, and of great value for the period personally known to the author, which occupies the greater portion of the book. The earlier part is based, to a considerable extent, on the legendary history of Boece. Buchanan's purpose was to "purge" the national history "of sum Inglis lyis and Scottis vanite" (Letter to Randolph). He said that it would "content few and displease many"; in fact, its matter gave so much offence that a proclamation was issued calling in all copies of it, as well as of the De Jure Regni, that they might be purged of the "offensive and extraordinary matters" which they contained.

=== Lasting legacy ===
Buchanan holds his great and unique place in literature not so much for his own writings as for his strong and lasting influence on subsequent writers. His influence was notable by 1726 when Andrew Millar, a prominent 18th-century bookseller, took over James McEuen's bookshop in London at the sign of 'Buchanan's Head, Temple Bar'. The sign for the shop depicted the face of George Buchanan, a testament to Buchanan's early place and reputation in Scottish letters. The island of Mainland, Orkney is sometimes referred to as Pomona (or Pomonia) from an attempted translation by Buchanan, though that name has rarely been used locally.

== Modern publications and influence ==
Polygon Books have published the poet Robert Crawford's selection of Buchanan's verse in Apollos of the North: Selected Poems of George Buchanan and Arthur Johnston (ISBN 1-904598-81-1) in 2006, the 500th anniversary of Buchanan's birth.

In the lead-up to the anniversary Professor Roger Mason of the University of St Andrews has published A Dialogue on the Law of Kingship among the Scots, a critical edition and translation of George Buchanan's 'De Iure Regni apud Scotos Dialogus (ISBN 1-85928-408-6).

The George Buchanan Forum is named after him, and seeks to "educate and equip people with a message of liberty and the gospel through integrating theology, natural law, and history."

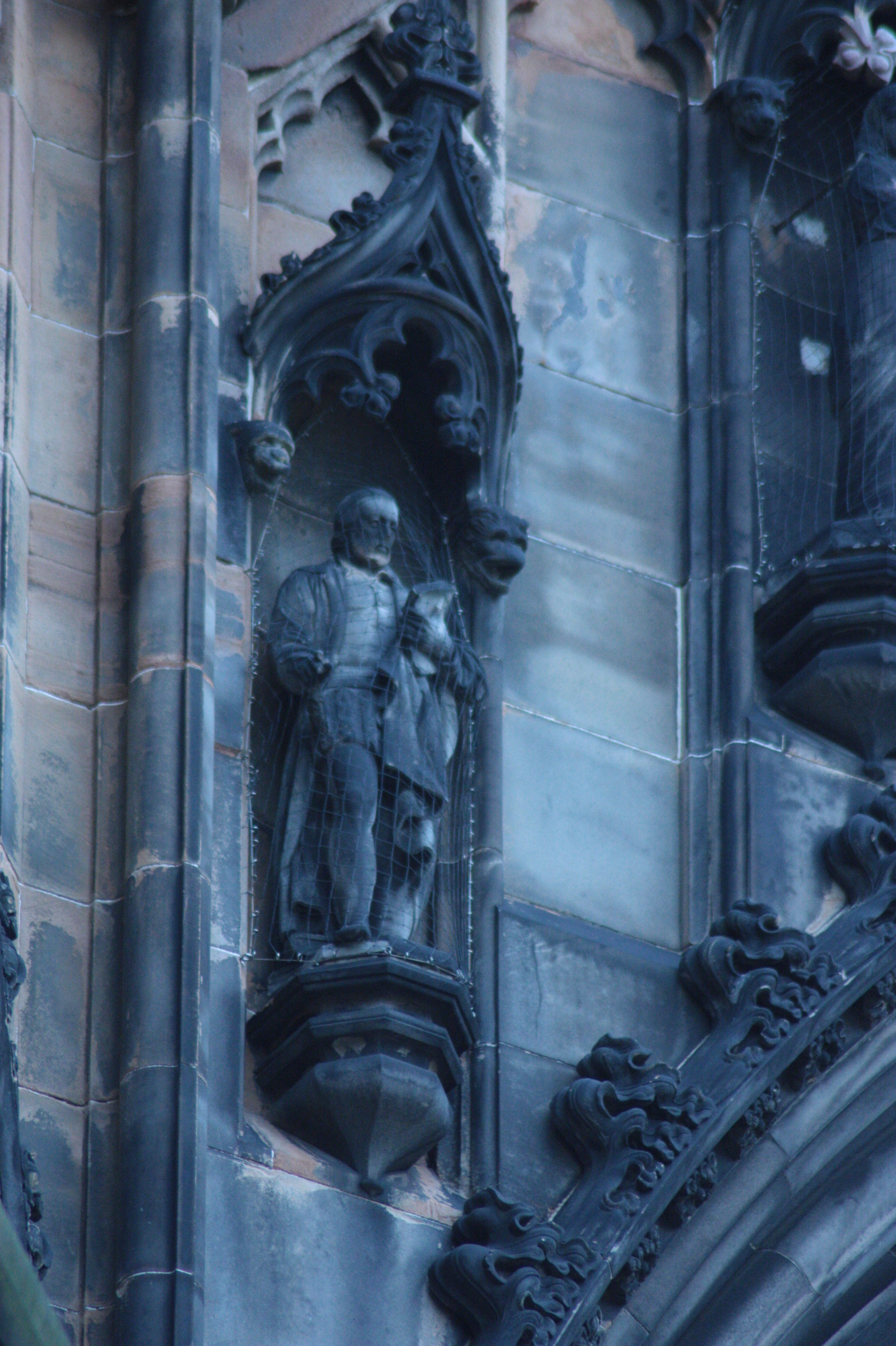
George Buchanan's statue on the Scott Monument

== Memorials ==
A statue of Buchanan stands on the west-facing side of the Scott Monument on Princes Street, Edinburgh. It was sculpted by John Rhind.

A memorial stained glass window stands in the south wall of Greyfriars Kirk.

A bust of Buchanan is in the Hall of Heroes of the National Wallace Monument in Stirling.

A monument was erected by public subscription in 1789 in the place of his birth, Killearn, Stirlingshire. It is attributed to the architect James Craig.

== See also ==
- Scottish literature
- British Latin Literature

Political offices
Preceded by John Maitland	Keeper of the Privy Seal of Scotland; 1571–1583	Succeeded by Walter Stewart
