= Natalis Beda =

Natalis Beda (French: Noël Beda; c. 1470 – 18 January 1537, Mont-Saint-Michel) was a French civil magistrate (syndic) and Catholic theologian best known for his staunch opposition to humanism and the Protestant Reformation, including the Meaux group.

He was professor of theology, principal of the Collège de Montaigu from 1504 to 1513, and dean of the Sorbonne's Faculty of Theology.

Charged by the Sorbonne with examining the doctrinal conformity of Erasmus' paraphrase of the Gospel of Luke, he identified some fifty condemnable propositions.

Beda was satirized by François Rabelais in Gargantua and Pantagruel.

== Works ==
- Annotations (1526)
- Adversus clandestinos Lutheranos (1529)

== See also ==
- Erasmus
- Petrus Sutor
- Jan Standonck
- Louis de Berquin
- Gérard Roussel
- Pierre Lizet
