= António de Gouveia =

Portuguese humanist and educator

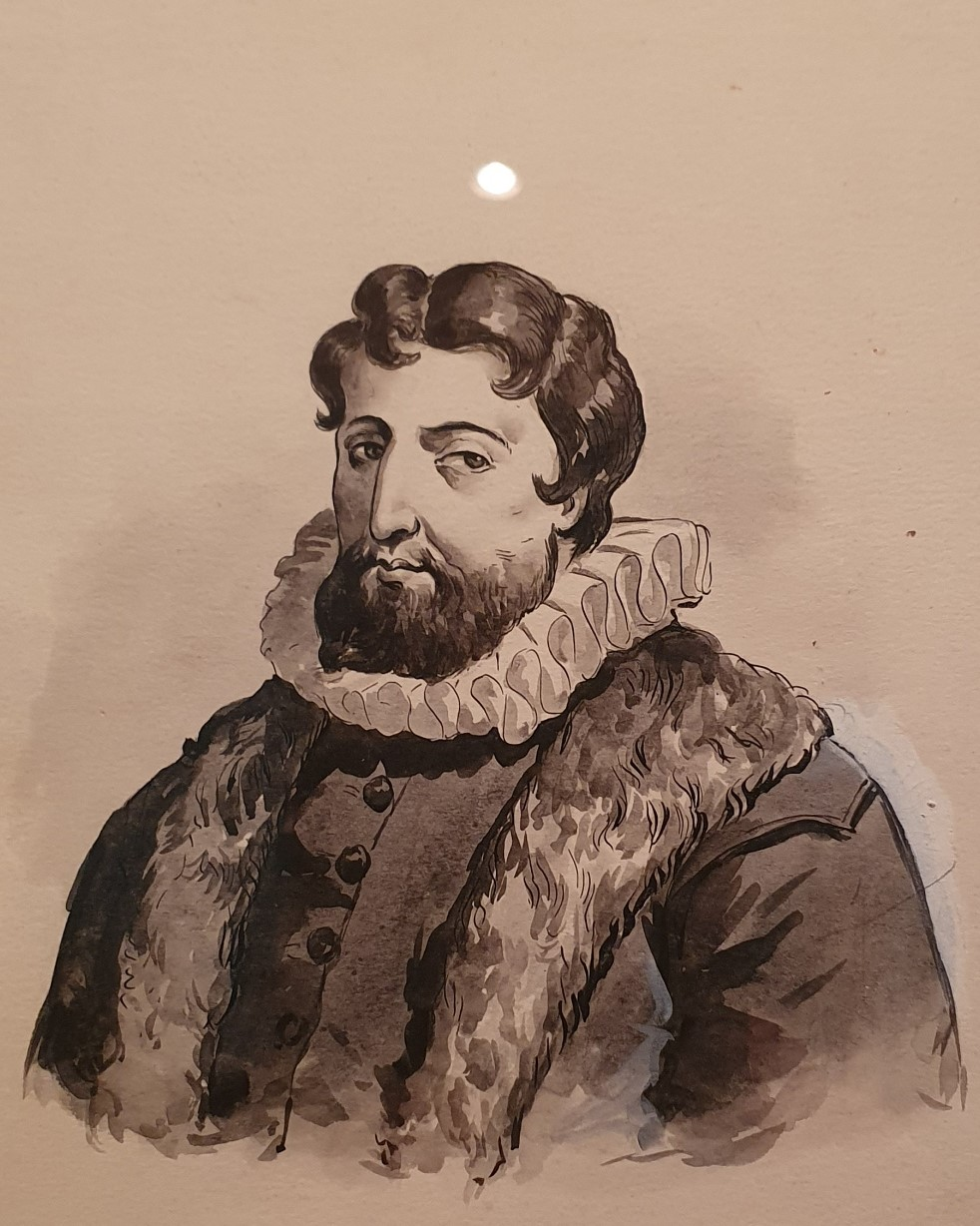
- Born: c. 1505; Beja, Kingdom of Portugal
- Died: March 1566; Turin, Duchy of Savoy
- Occupations: Humanist, educator

António de Gouveia (c.1505 – March 1566) was a Portuguese humanist and educator during the Renaissance.

Gouveia was born in Beja. After graduating in Paris he taught at the Collège de Guyenne in Bordeaux, and then at Toulouse, Avignon, Lyon, Cahors, Valence, Grenoble, Turin and Mondovi. His controversy with Pierre de la Ramée about Aristotle became famous. He wrote literary and philosophical works, having correspondeded with most of the writers of his time. He was brother to André de Gouveia and nephew of Diogo de Gouveia the elder.

== Biography ==
He was the seventh child of Inês de Gouveia and Afonso Lopes de Ayala. In 1527 he went to study at the University of Paris along with 28 other Portuguese students, who were granted scholarships by King John III of Portugal advised by his uncle Diogo, then rector of Collège Sainte-Barbe. Circa 1534, he moved with his brother André to the College of Guienne in Bordeaux. Shortly after he departed to Toulouse, then Avignon and Lyon, where he studied law, having published several works. After returning to the College of Guienne in 1543 he engaged in a defense of Aristoteles against the views of Pierre de la Ramée (Ramus), having published Pro Aristotele responsio aduersus Petri Rami calumnias, which gained him the approval of Francis I of France. He died in Turin.

His works dealt mainly with law, but also poetry, fruit of time he spent editing and translating classical sources in search of the original meaning. Although sympathetic to Lutheranism and once accused of being an atheist by John Calvin, he returned to Catholic orthodoxy.
