= Charles Perrot (minister) =

French Reformed minister

Charles Perrot (1541–1608) was a French Reformed minister who served in the Republic of Geneva.

Perrot came from a French family who were Nobles of the Robe and was born in Paris. He studied at the Genevan Academy and in 1564 became a minister. He married Sarah Cop (daughter of Michel Cop) in 1566, and became a citizen of Geneva in 1567. Perrot served as a minister in the city from 1568 until his death. He acted as rector at the Academy from 1570–1572 and 1588–1592.

Scott Manetsch describes Perrot as "an idealist prone to discouragement, a man of deep piety who valued Christian charity as much a theological precision." Perrot's "pulpit jeremiads against social injustice and his advocacy for the poor sometimes put him at odds with Geneva's magistrates."
