= André de Gouveia =

Portuguese humanist

- Born: 1497; Beja, Kingdom of Portugal
- Died: 9 June 1548 (aged 50–51); Coimbra, Kingdom of Portugal
- Occupations: Humanist, pedagogue

André de Gouveia (1497 – 9 June 1548) was a Portuguese humanist and pedagogue during the Renaissance.

== Biography ==
André de Gouveia became one of the first Portuguese to study in the Collège Sainte-Barbe, in Paris, which was then directed by his uncle Diogo de Gouveia. After attending six years in Maîtrise des Arts he earned a degree as doctor in theology, and simultaneously, began teaching at the college.

Starting in 1530, due to the many diplomatic missions that kept his uncle away, André was entrusted by him with the direction of the Collège. As an adept of the most advanced religious ideas, André de Gouveia bent Saint Barbe into the Humanist ideals. There in 1531 he appointed regent Nicolas Cop. After Cop's contested inaugural address as rector of the university in 1533, he was appointed rector of the University of Paris for the college of arts (liberal arts), introducing new rules for transparency and fairness among all disciplines, but soon departed.

He left to take charge as principal of the College of Guienne, in Bordeaux. He had been invited by the municipal authorities, and was given full freedom to modernize the old college. On arrival, Gouveia proclaimed that he would not recognize differences of creed in staff and pupils, many of whom showed sympathy to the new doctrines of the Reform. There, in 1539, Gouveia welcomed George Buchanan, appointing him professor of Latin.

Gouveia's stay at the College of Guienne lasted until 1547, attracting students like Étienne de La Boétie and Michel de Montaigne, who later in his Essays described Gouveia as " ...behind comparison the greatest principal in France." The fame of the teaching -mainly grammar, classical literature, history and philosophy - was such that, in 1552, Italian scholar and physician Julius Caesar Scaliger sent his sons to the college, including Joseph Justus Scaliger.

André de Gouveia returned to Portugal at the invitation of King John III, accompanied by a group of foreign teachers, to head the new College of the Arts at the University of Coimbra. In this group were Diogo de Teive, George Buchanan, Jerónimo Osório, Nicolas de Grouchy, Guillaume Guérante and Élie Vinet, who came to be decisive for the disclosure of contemporary research of Pedro Nunes. However, Gouveia did not remain for long in office as president of the college, as he died in June 1548.

Rivalry between the secular trends of the new "Bordeaux" teachers, and the more orthodox method of the "Parisian" school headed by Diogo de Gouveia led several teachers, including George Buchanan, to face the Inquisition: Gouveia kept numerous contacts with European scholars and Portuguese businesses when he was in France. At odds with his uncle Diogo, André was suspected of Lutheranism.

He left a few written texts. In particular, his views are represented in regulations of the College of Guienne, published by Elie Vinet in 1583 under the title Schola Aquitanica. André de Gouveia was brother to humanist and teacher António de Gouveia.
