= Robert Balfour (philosopher) =

Scottish philosopher

Robert Balfour (c. 1553–1621; known also as Balforeus) was a Scottish philosopher.

He was educated at the University of St Andrews and the University of Paris. He was for many years principal of the College of Guienne at Bordeaux.

== Works ==
His great work is his Commentarii in Organum Logicum Aristotelis (Bordeaux, 1618); the copy in the British Museum contains a number of highly eulogistic poems in honour of Balfour, who is described as Graium aemulus acer. Balfour was one of the scholars who contributed to spread over Europe the fame of the praefervidum ingenium Scotorum. His contemporary, Thomas Dempster, called him the "phoenix of his age, a philosopher profoundly skilled in the Greek and Latin languages, and a mathematician worthy of being compared with the ancients."

His Cleomedis meteora, with notes and Latin translation, was reprinted at Leiden as late as 1820.
