= Francisco Sanches =

Portuguese philosopher

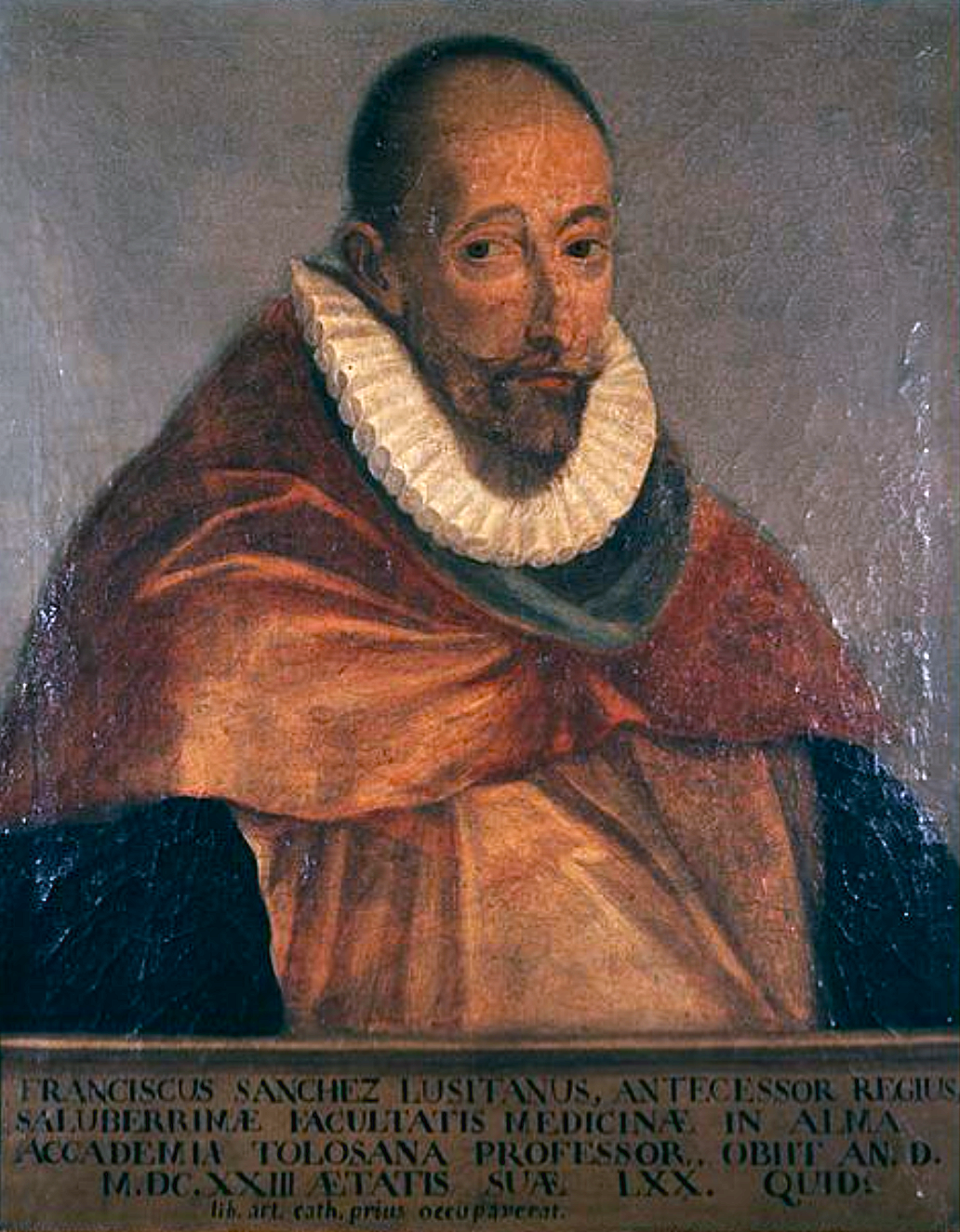
- Francisco Sanches
- Born: c. 1550; Braga, Kingdom of Portugal or Tui, Kingdom of Spain
- Died: November 16, 1623; Toulouse, Kingdom of France

Education
- Education: College of Guienne

Philosophical work
- Era: Renaissance philosophy
- Region: Western philosophy
- School: Renaissance skepticism (Note: It is disputed whether Sanches belonged to les nouveaux pyrrhoniens of the Renaissance. Paganini argues that contrary to what has been conjectured, there is no evidence that his skepticism was the result of the then-new influence of Sextus Empiricus; however, Damian Caluori argues that Sanches does belong to the Pyrrhonist tradition.)
- Institutions: University of Toulouse
- Main interests: Epistemology, natural philosophy
- Notable ideas: "Nothing is known"

Francisco Sanches (/ˈsɑːntʃɛs/; Spanish: [ˈsantʃes]; c. 1550 – November 16, 1623) was a Hispano-Portuguese skeptic, philosopher and physician of Sephardi Jewish origin, born possibly in Tui, Spain or probably in Braga, Portugal (where he was baptized and grew up).

== Early life and academic career ==
In the auditorium of the University of Toulouse there is a portrait of Francisco Sánchez, which bears the following inscription: "Francisco Sanchez Lusitanus". His father was the Spaniard Antonio Sanches, also a physician; his mother Filipa de Sousa was Portuguese. Being of Jewish origin, even if converted, he was legally considered a New Christian.

He studied in Braga until the age of 12, when he moved to Bordeaux with his parents, fleeing the surveillance of the Portuguese Inquisition. There he resumed his studies at the College de Guyenne. He went on to study medicine in Rome in 1569, and, back in France, in Montpellier and Toulouse. He ended up, after 1575, as a professor of philosophy and medicine at the University of Toulouse.

== Thought ==
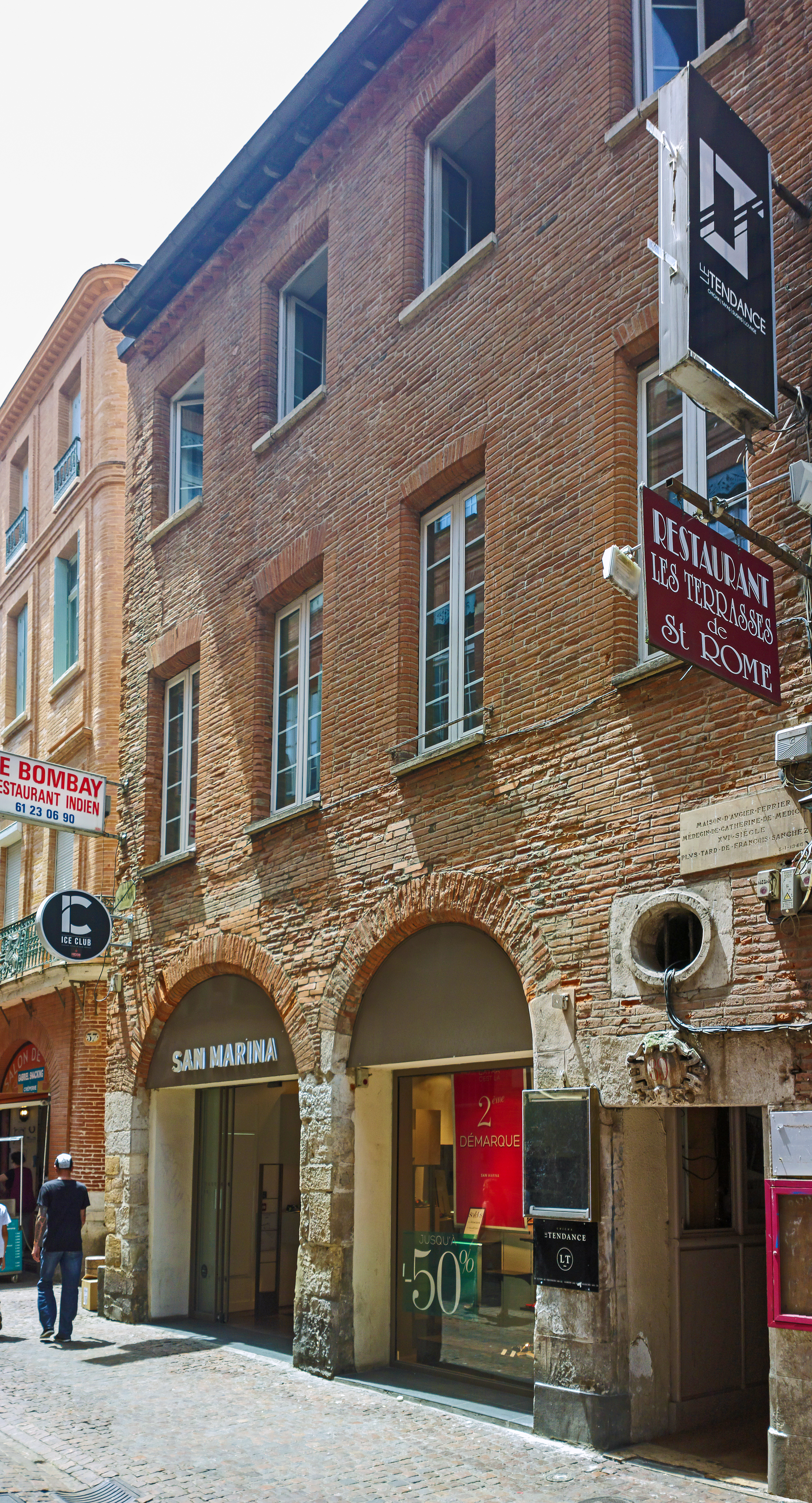
His house in Toulouse

In his Quod nihil scitur (That Nothing Is Known), written in 1576 and published in 1581, he used the classical skeptical arguments to show that science, in the Aristotelian sense of giving necessary reasons or causes for the behavior of nature, cannot be attained: the search for causes quickly descends into an infinite regress and so cannot give certitude. He also attacked demonstrations in the forms of syllogisms, arguing that the particular (the conclusion) is needed to have a conception of the general (the premises) and thus that syllogisms were circular and did not add to knowledge.

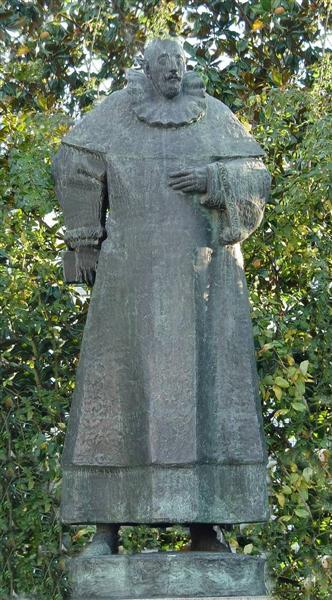
Statue of Francisco Sanches, by Salvador Barata Feyo in Braga.

Perfect knowledge, if attainable, is the intuitive apprehension of each individual thing. But, he then argued, even his own notion of science (perfect knowledge of an individual thing) is beyond human capabilities because of the nature of objects and the nature of man. The interrelation of objects, their unlimited number, and their ever-changing character prevent their being known. The limitations and variability of man's senses restrict him to knowledge of appearances — the real substances cannot be known. In forming this last argument he drew on his experience of Medicine to show how unreliable our sense experience is.

Sanches' first conclusion was the usual fideistic one of the time, that truth can be gained by faith. His second conclusion was to play an important role in later thought: just because nothing can be known in an ultimate sense, we should not abandon all attempts at knowledge but should try to gain what knowledge we can, namely, limited, imperfect knowledge of some of those things with which we become acquainted through observation, experience, and judgment. The realization that nihil scitur ("nothing is known") thus can yield some constructive results. This early formulation of "constructive" or "mitigated" skepticism was to be developed into an important explication of the new science by Marin Mersenne, Pierre Gassendi, and the leaders of the Royal Society.

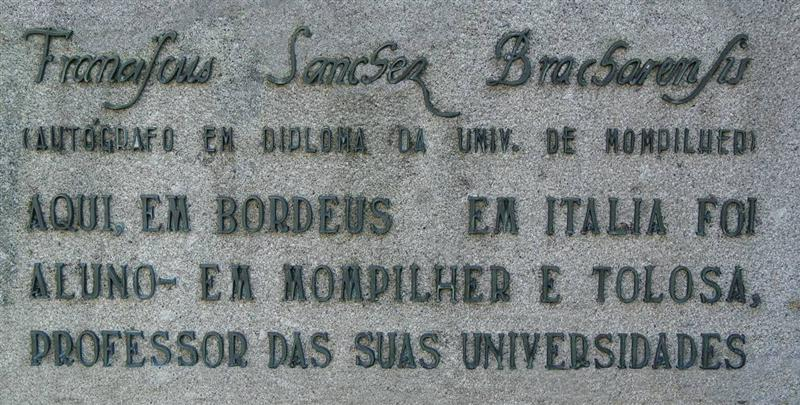
Reproduction of Francisco Sanches' signature as found in his diploma from the University of Montpellier. It reads, in Latin, Franciscus Sanches Bracharensis, or Francisco Sanches of Braga. From the statue by Salvador Barata Feyo.

== Works ==
- Carmen de Cometa, 1577.
- Quod nihil scitur, 1581.
- De divinatione per somnum, ad Aristotelem, 1585.
- Opera Medica, 1636, which includes:
  - De Longitudine et Brevitate vitae, liber
  - In lib. Aristotelis Physiognomicon, Commentarius
  - De Divinatione per Somnum
  - Quod Nihil Scitur, liber
- Tractatus Philosophici, 1649.

=== Translations ===
- Sanchez, Franciscus (2007), Daß nichts gewußt wird – Quod nihil scitur, Hamburg: Meiner Verlag, ISBN 978-3-7873-1815-5 – Latin-German. Introduction and Notes by Kaspar Howald. Translated by Damian Caluori and Kaspar Howald. Latin Text by Sergei Mariev. PhB 586. 2007.
- Sanchez, Francisco; Limbrick, Elaine. Introduction, Notes, and Bibliography; Thomson, Douglas F.S. Latin text established, annotated, and translated. (1988), That Nothing is Known, Cambridge: Cambridge University Press, ISBN 0-521-35077-8 – Critical edition of Quod nihil scitur.
- Sanchez, Francisco; Buccolini, C., Lojacono, E. Latin text and Italian translation, with Introduction, Notes, and Bibliography (2011), Tutte le opere filosofiche, Milano: Bompiani, ISBN 9788845267246.
- Sánchez, Francisco. 1991, Que nada se sabe. Introduction: Palacios, Fernando A. Spanish translation, Espasa-Calpe, Madrid. ISBN 9788423972357
