= Mark Alexander Boyd =

Scottish poet and soldier of fortune (1562–1601)

- Born: 13 January 1562; Ayrshire, Scotland
- Died: 10 April 1601 (aged 39)

Mark Alexander Boyd (13 January 1562 – 10 April 1601) was a Scottish poet and soldier of fortune. He was born in Ayrshire, Scotland. His father was from Penkill, Carrick, in Ayrshire. He was educated under the care of his uncle, the Archbishop of Glasgow, James Boyd of Trochrig. As a young man, he left Scotland for France, where he studied civil law. He took part in the French Wars of Religion, serving in the army of Henri III.

He had two collections of Latin poems published, in 1590 and 1592, at a time when he was teaching at the College of Guienne in Bordeaux. He returned to Scotland in 1596, and died back in Ayrshire on 10 April 1601. He is now remembered for one poem in Scots, the Sonnet of Venus and Cupid, which was attributed to him by Arthur Quiller-Couch in 1900, and which Ezra Pound called "the most beautiful sonnet in the language". The first two lines of this poem appear on the Royal Bank of Scotland £20 note.

== Works ==
- Marci Alexandri Bodii Scoti Epistolae quindecim, quibus totidem Ovidii respondet. Accedent & ejusdem elegiae, epigrammata, illustriumque mulierum elogia. Bordeaux: Simon Millanges. 1590. p. 122.
- Epistolae Heroides et Hymni (1592)
- Sonnet of Venus and Cupid

== Bibliography ==
- Pound, Ezra. ABC of Reading (1934) New Directions (reprint). ISBN 0-8112-1893-7
