= Alexander Broadie =

Scottish philosopher

Alexander Broadie FRSE (born 18 October 1942) is a Scottish philosopher who is emeritus professor of logic and rhetoric at Glasgow University. He writes on the Scottish philosophical tradition, chiefly the philosophy of the pre-Reformation period, the 17th century, and the Enlightenment.

== Life ==
Broadie was born in Edinburgh and attended the Royal High School, Edinburgh, the University of Edinburgh (MA), Balliol College, Oxford (MLitt), and the University of Glasgow (PhD, DLitt). He was Henry Duncan prize lecturer in Scottish Studies, Royal Society of Edinburgh (1990–1993), and has been a Fellow of the Royal Society of Edinburgh since 1991. As Gifford Lecturer in Natural Theology at Aberdeen University in 1994, he delivered a series of Lectures published under the title The Shadow of Scotus: Philosophy and Faith in Pre-Reformation Scotland (1995). Since demitting his professorship of logic and rhetoric at Glasgow University (held from 1994 to 2009) he has been honorary professorial research fellow there, mainly researching 17th-century Scottish philosophy.

In 2007 Broadie was awarded the degree of DUniv honoris causa by Blaise Pascal University at Clermont-Ferrand in recognition of his contribution to Franco-Scottish collaboration in the field of the history of philosophy.

Broadie's A History of Scottish Philosophy (2009) was named Saltire Society Scottish History Book of the Year. In July 2018 he received a Lifetime Achievement Award from the Eighteenth-Century Scottish Studies Society, and in 2020 was appointed honorary president of the Saltire Society in recognition of his contribution to Scottish philosophy.

During the past decade Broadie has been active in several international networks. His roles have included: Principal Investigator, International Network: 'Scottish philosophy and philosophers in seventeenth-century Scotland and France' (2010-2014), funded by the Leverhulme Trust; and Co-Investigator (with Dr Ramona Fotiade), International Research Network: 'Existential Philosophy and Literature: The Franco-Scottish Connection - Past and Present' (2017-2019), funded by the Royal Society of Edinburgh. He is presently working on two books relating to Scottish philosophy of the seventeenth century.

== Works ==
- A Samaritan Philosophy (Leiden 1981)
- George Lokert: Late-Scholastic Logician (EUP 1983)
- The Circle of John Mair: Logic and Logicians in Pre-Reformation Scotland (OUP 1985)
- Introduction to Medieval Logic (OUP 1987), 2nd edn 1993
- Notion and Object: Aspects of Late-Medieval Epistemology (OUP 1989)
- Paul of Venice: Logica Magna, Pt.2, Fasc.3, De hypotheticis (OUP for the British Academy 1990)
- The Tradition of Scottish Philosophy (Edinburgh 1990)
- Robert Kilwardby, O.P., On Time and Imagination, Introduction and Translation (OUP for the British Academy 1993)
- The Shadow of the Scotus: Philosophy and Faith in Pre-Reformation Scotland (Edinburgh 1995)
- The Scottish Enlightenment: An Anthology (Edinburgh 1997)
- Why Scottish Philosophy Matters (Edinburgh 2000)
- The Scottish Enlightenment: The Historical Age of the Historical Nation, Edinburgh (Edinburgh 2001), new edn 2007
- The Cambridge Companion to the Scottish Enlightenment, sole editor (CUP 2003), Chinese edn 2011; 2nd English language edn (co-editor Craig Smith, 2019)
- Thomas Reid on Logic, Rhetoric and the Fine Arts, vol. 5 in the Edinburgh Edition of Thomas Reid. (EUP 2005)
- George Turnbull's Principles of Moral and Christian Philosophy, 2 vols., edited, annotated and with an introduction (Liberty Fund 2005)
- A History of Scottish Philosophy (2009), pb edn 2010 (Saltire Society Scottish History Book of the Year 2009)
- Agreeable Connexions: Scottish Enlightenment Links with France (Edinburgh 2012)
- Studies in Seventeenth-Century Scottish Philosophers and their Philosophy, guest editor, special issue of History of Universities, vol. 29, no. 2 (OUP 2017)
- Scottish Philosophy in the Seventeenth Century, editor and contributor (OUP 2020)
- Philosophical Discourse in Seventeenth-Century Scotland: Key Texts, editor and contributor (The Boydell Press, forthcoming)
