= Henry of Oyta =

German theologian and philosopher

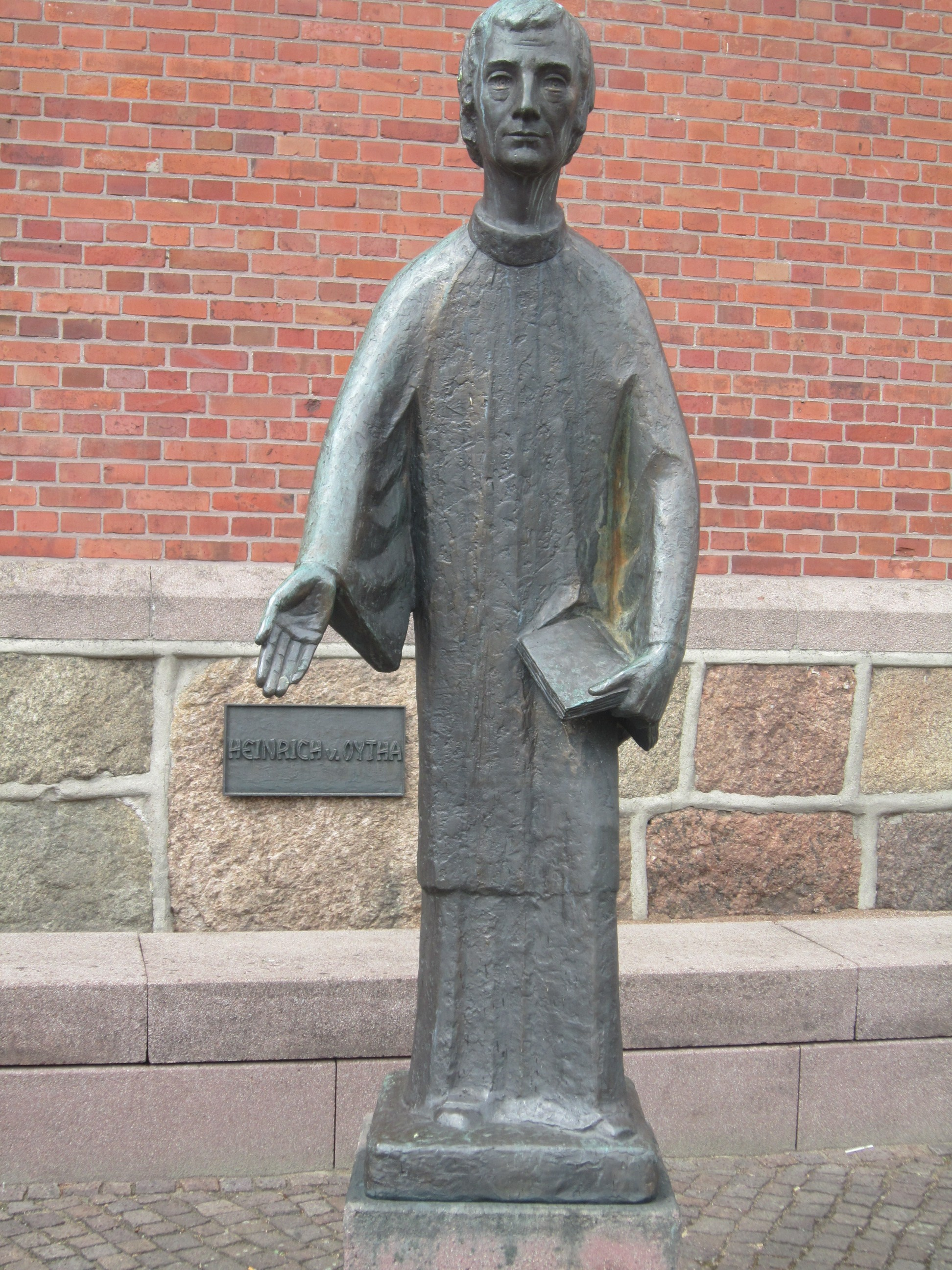
Bronze sculpture showing Heinrich Totting von Oytha in Friesoythe

Henry of Oyta (German: Heinrich Totting von Oyta; c. 1330 – 1397) was a German theologian and nominalist philosopher.

== Life ==
He was born at Friesoythe in present-day Lower Saxony. Henry graduated M.A. at the University of Prague in 1355. He was then rector of a school in Erfurt, and returned to Prague in 1366. In the course of a long-running dispute, Adalbert Ranconis accused him of heresy in 1369–70. He began teaching at the University of Paris in 1377. For reasons connected with the Western Schism, he left Paris in 1381; he then taught at Prague, 1381 to 1381, lecturing there on the Psalms and Gospel of John. He was at the University of Vienna from 1384(?) to 1390; he drew up the statutes there in 1389, with Henry of Langenstein.

He died in Vienna.

== Works ==
- Tractatus de contractibus

Around 1374 he abridged the Sentences commentary of Adam Wodeham.

== See also ==
- Gabriel Biel
- John Mair
- Adam de Wodeham
