= Peter Crockaert =

Flemish philosopher

Peter Crockaert OP (c. 1465–1514), known as Peter of Brussels, was a Flemish scholastic philosopher. Initially he was a pupil of John Mair and a follower of William of Ockham. Later he joined the Dominican Order, and became a supporter of orthodox Thomism. He taught at the University of Paris, and is known for a number of commentaries, on Aristotle and Peter of Spain as well as on Aquinas.
