= John Major (philosopher) =

Scottish philosopher (1467–1550)

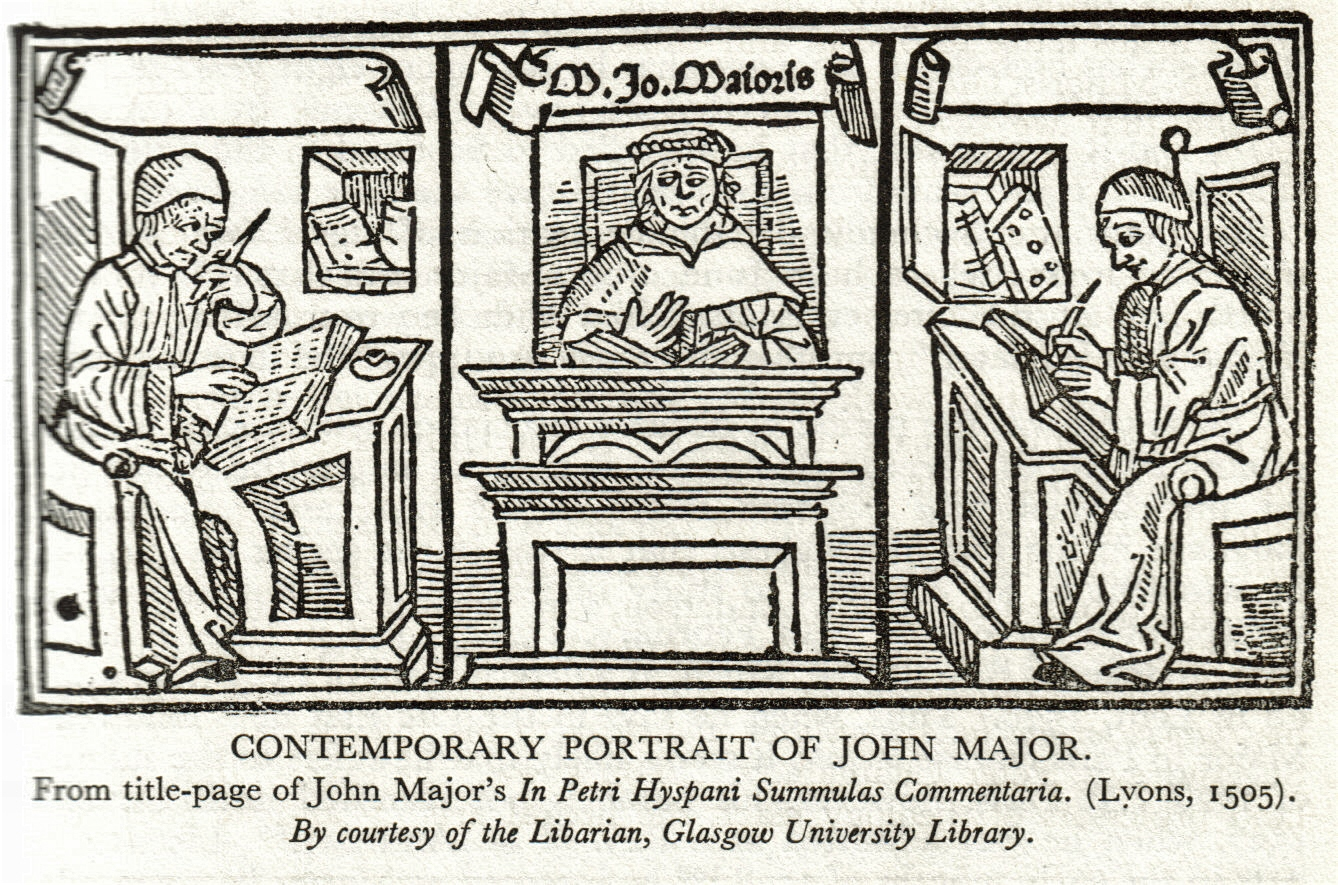
Major in a contemporary woodcut

John Major (or Mair; also known in Latin as Joannes Majoris and Haddingtonus Scotus; 1467–1550) was a Scottish philosopher, theologian, and historian who was admired and influential. As a renowned teacher, his works were collected and republished across Europe. His "sane conservatism" and his sceptical, logical approach to the study of texts such as Aristotle or the Bible went out of fashion in the subsequent age of humanism.

Mair's influence extended to logic (especially the analysis of terms), natural philosophy (impetus and infinitesimals), politics (placing the people over kings), Church (councils over Popes), and international law (human rights of indigenous peoples conquered by the Spanish). His Latin style lacked elegance; but he was observant, and used his experiences – of earthquakes in Paisley, thunder in Glasgow, storms at sea, eating oatcakes in northern England – to illustrate his logical writings.

== Life ==
=== School ===
John Major (or 'Mair') was born about 1467 at Gleghornie, East Lothian near North Berwick where he received his early education. It was at nearby Haddington, East Lothian, Scotland, where he attended grammar school. He was probably taught by the town schoolmaster, who was, according to Major "although a circumspect man in other ways, more severe than was just in beating boys". If it had not been for the influence of his mother, Major says he would have left, but he and his brother stayed on and were successful. According to him, Haddington was "the town which fostered the beginning of my studies, and in whose kindly embrace I was nourished as a novice with the sweetest milk of the art of grammar". He says he stayed in Haddington "to a pretty advanced age" and he remembers the sound of the King James III's bombardment of the nearby castle of Dunbar, which was in 1479. He also remembers the comet which was supposed to have foretold the King's defeat at Sauchieburn which was in 1488.

However, it was in 1490, he reports, that he "first left the paternal hearth". In 1490, probably under the influence of Robert Cockburn, another Haddington man, destined to be an influential bishop (of Ross and later of Dunkeld), he decided to go to Paris to study among the great numbers of Scots there at the time.

=== University ===
It is not known whether he attended university in Scotland as a student – there are no matriculation records of him and he claimed never to have seen the university town of St Andrews, Fife as a young man (though he did complain later of its bad beer). He seems to have decided to prepare for Paris at Cambridge in England. He says that in 1492 he attended "Gods House", which later became Christ's College. He remembers the bells – "on great feast days, I spent half the night listening to them" – but was obviously well-prepared, as he left for Paris after three terms.

In 1493 he matriculated in the University of Paris, France, then the foremost university in Europe. He studied at the Collège Sainte-Barbe and took his Bachelor of Arts degree there in 1495 followed by his master's degree in 1496. There were many currents of thought in Paris but he was heavily influenced, as were fellow Scots such as Lawrence of Lindores by the nominalist and empiricist approach of John Buridan. (The latter's influence on Copernicus and Galileo can be traced through Major's published works). He became a student master ('regent') in Arts in the Collège de Montaigu in 1496 and began the study of theology under the formidable Jan Standonck. He consorted with scholars of later renown, some from his hometown, Robert Walterston, and his home country (David Cranston of Glasgow, who died in 1512), but mostly they were the luminaries of the age, including Erasmus, whose reforming enthusiasms he shared, Rabelais and Reginald Pole. In the winter of 1497 he had a serious illness, from which he never completely recovered. He had never had dreams before, but ever afterwards he was troubled by dreams, migraine, colic and "excessive sleepiness" (he was always hard to awaken). In 1499, he moved to the College of Navarre. In 1501, he received his degree of Bachelor of Sacred Theology and in 1505 his logical writings were collected and published for the first time. In 1506 he was licensed to teach theology and was awarded the degree of Doctor of Sacred Theology on 11 November that year (coming 3rd in the listings). He taught at the Collège de Montaigu (where he was, temporarily joint Director) and also the prestigious Sorbonne, where he served on many commissions.

=== Later career ===
In 1510 he discussed the moral and legal questions arising from the Spanish discovery of America. He claimed that the natives had political and property rights that could not be invaded, at least not without compensation. He also uses the new discoveries to argue for the possibility of innovation in all knowledge saying "Has not Amerigo Vespucci discovered lands unknown to Ptolemy, Pliny and other geographers up to the present? Why cannot the same happen in other spheres?" At the same time, he was impatient of humanist criticism of the logical analysis of texts (including the Bible). "...these questions which the humanists think futile, are like a ladder for the intelligence to rise towards the Bible" (which he elsewhere, perhaps unwisely called "the easier parts of theology"). Nevertheless, in 1512, like a good humanist, he learned Greek from Girolamo Aleandro (who re-introduced the study of Greek to Paris) who wrote "Many scholastics are to be found in France who are keen students in different kinds of knowledge and several of these are among my faithful hearers, such as John Mair, Doctor of Philosophy..."

In 1518 he returned to Scotland to become Principal of the University of Glasgow (and also canon of the cathedral, vicar of Dunlop and Treasurer of the Chapel Royal). He returned to Paris several times – by sea one time, getting delayed in Dieppe for three weeks by a storm; and by land another time, having dinner en route through England with his friend, Cardinal Wolsey. He offered Major a post, which he declined, in his new college at the University of Oxford, to be called Cardinal's College, (later Christ Church, Oxford). In 1528, King Francis I of France issued Major with a patent of naturalisation, making him a naturalised subject of France.

In 1533 he was made Provost of St Salvator's College in the University of St Andrews – to which thronged many of the most significant men in Scotland, including John Knox and George Buchanan. He missed Paris – "When I was in Scotland, I often thought how I would go back to Paris and give lectures as I used to and hear disputations". He died in 1550 (perhaps on 1 May), his works read throughout Europe, his name honoured everywhere, just as the storms of the Reformation were about to sweep away, at least in his own country, any respect for his centuries-old methodology.

=== Some publications by John Major ===
- Heinrich Totting von Oytha's abbreviation of Adam de Wodeham's Oxford Lectures, edited by Major, Paris 1512.
- Lectures in logic (Lyons 1516)
- Reportata Parisiensia by Duns Scotus co-edited by Major, Paris 1517–18
- Commentary on the Sentences of Peter Lombard (In Libros Sententiarum primum et secundum commentarium) Paris 1519
- History of Greater Britain (Historia majoris Britanniae, tam Angliae quam Scotiae) Paris 1521
- Commentary on Aristotle's physical and ethical writings Paris 1526
- Quaestiones logicales Paris 1528
- Commentary on the Four Gospels Paris 1528
- Disputationes de Potestate Papae et Concilii (Paris)
- Commentary on Aristotle's Nicomachean Ethics (his last book)

== Influence ==
=== Historians ===
His De Gestis Scotorum (Paris, 1521) was partly a patriotic attempt to raise the profile of his native country, but was also an attempt to clear away myth and fable, basing his history on evidence. In this, he was following in the footsteps of his predecessor, the Chronicler Andrew of Wyntoun, though writing in Latin for a European audience as opposed to the Scots Andrew wrote for his aristocratic Scots patrons. Although the documentary evidence available to Major was limited, his scholarly approach was adopted and improved by later historians of Scotland, including his pupil Hector Boece, and John Lesley.

=== Calvin and Loyola ===
In 1506 he was awarded a doctorate in theology by Paris where he began to teach and progress through the hierarchy, becoming for a brief period Rector. (Some 18 of his fellow Scots had held or were to hold this prestigious position). He was a renowned logician and philosopher. He is reported to have been a very clear and forceful lecturer, attracting students from all over Europe. In contrast, he had a rather dry, some said 'barbaric', written Latin style. He was referred to by Pierre Bayle as writing "in stylo Sorbonico", not meaning this as a compliment. His interests ranged across the burning issues of the day. His approach largely followed Nominalism which was in tune with the growing emphasis on the absolutely unconstrained nature of God, which in turn emphasised his grace and the importance of individual belief and submission. His humanist approach was in tune with the return to the texts in the original languages of the Scriptures and classical authors. He emphasised that authority lay with the whole church and not with the Pope. Similarly, he asserted that authority in a kingdom lay not with the king but with the people, who could retake their power from a delinquent king (a striking echo of the ringing Declaration of Arbroath 1320 confirming to the Pope the independence of the Scottish crown from that of England). It is not surprising that he emphasised the natural freedom of human beings.

His influence extended through enthusiastic pupils to the leading thinkers of the day but most obviously to a group of Spanish thinkers, including Antonio Coronel, who taught John Calvin and very probably Ignatius of Loyola.

In 1522, at Salamanca, Domingo de San Juan referred to him as "the revered master, John Mair, a man celebrated the world over". The Salamanca school of (largely Thomist) philosophers was a brilliant flowering of thought until the early parts of the seventeenth century. It included Francisco de Vitoria, Cano, de Domingo de Soto and Bartolomé de Medina, each one thorough soaked in Mairian enthusiasms.

=== Knox ===
Major wrote in his Commentary on the Sentences of Peter Lombard "Our native soil attracts us with a secret and inexpressible sweetness and does not permit us to forget it". He returned to Scotland in 1518. Given his success and experience in Paris, it is no surprise that he became the Principal of the University of Glasgow. In 1523 left for the University of St Andrews where he was assessor to the Dean of Arts. In 1525 he went again to Paris from where he returned in 1531 eventually to become Provost of St Salvator's College, St Andrews until his death in 1550, aged about eighty three.

One of his most notable students was John Knox (coincidentally, another native of Haddington) who said of Major that he was such as "whose work was then held as an oracle on the matters of religion" If this is not exactly a ringing endorsement, it is not hard to see in Knox's preaching an intense version of Major's enthusiasms – the utter freedom of God, the importance of the Bible, scepticism of earthly authority. It might be more surprising that Major preferred to follow his friend Erasmus's example and remain within the Roman Catholic Church (though he did envisage a national church for Scotland). Major also filled with enthusiasm other Scottish Reformers including the Protestant martyr Patrick Hamilton and the Latin stylist George Buchanan, whose enthusiasm for witty Latinisms had him waspishly suggesting that the only thing major about his ex-teacher was his surname – typical Renaissance disdain for the Schoolmen.

=== Empiricism ===
Major and his circle were interested in the structures of language – spoken, written and 'mental'. This latter was the language which underlies the thoughts that are expressed in natural languages, like Scots, English or Latin. He attacks a whole range of questions from a generally 'nominalist' perspective – a form of philosophical discourse whose tradition derives from the high Middle Ages and was to continue into that of the Scottish and other European empiricists. According to Alexander Broadie, Major's influence on this latter tradition reached as far as the 18th and 19th century Scottish School of Common Sense initiated by Thomas Reid. The highly logical and technical approach of Medieval philosophy – perhaps added to by Major's poor written style as well as his adherence to the Catholic party at the time of the Reformation – explain in some part why this influence is still somewhat occluded.

=== Human rights ===
More obviously influential was his moral philosophy, not primarily because of his casuistry – an approach acknowledging the complexity of individual cases. This was later so strong in Jesuit teaching, possibly related to the Major's renown in Spain mentioned above. His legal views were also influential. His Commentaries on the Sentences of Peter Lombard was most certainly studied and quoted in the debates at Burgos in 1512, by Frày Anton Montesino, a graduate of Salamanca. This "debate unique in the history of empires", as Hugh Thomas calls it, resulted in the recognition in Spanish law of the indigenous populations of America as being free human beings with all the rights (to liberty and property, for example) attached to them. This pronouncement was hedged in with many subtle qualifications, and the Spanish crown was never efficient at enforcing it, but it can be regarded as the fount of human rights law.

== See also ==
- Jean Buridan
- John Cantius
- Empiricism
- Henry of Oyta
- Scottish School of Common Sense
- Thomas Reid
- Adam de Wodeham
- David Cranston (philosopher)
