= Nicolas Cop =

Swiss Protestant reformer

Nicolas Cop (born circa 1501 in Paris and died 1540), rector of the University of Paris in late 1533, from 10 October 1533, was a Swiss Protestant Reformer and friend of John Calvin. Nicolas Cop and his brother Michel Cop, sons of the king's physician, had become Calvin's friends during their shared time at the Collège de Montaigu. They were sons of Guillaume Cop, a native of Basel who became physician to the king of France, Francis I.

Around 1533, when Calvin had returned to Paris, tensions were rising between the humanistic and religious reformers of the Collège Royal and the conservative senior faculty members. The Collège Royal was later to become the Collège de France. Nicolas Cop, one of the reformers, had been elected rector of the University of Paris although the institution generally condemned Martin Luther. On All Saints Day, November 1, 1533, Nicolas Cop as rector delivered his inaugural address, in which he revealed himself as being in sympathy with Luther. Cop discussed the need for reform and renewal in the Roman Catholic Church and highlighted differences between the Beatitudes of the Gospels and the theology and practices of the Roman Catholic Church pre-Counter Reformation. Calvin certainly influenced but did not write Cop's address, which defended the doctrine of justification by faith alone. Calvin is thought to have been complicit because he had fled from Paris just before Cop's delivery of the inaugural address.

Nicolas Cop's inaugural address as rector of the University of Paris provoked a strong reaction from the faculty, many of whom denounced it as heretical. Within just two days, on 3 November 1533, two Franciscans filed a complaint in the Parlement de Paris against Cop for heresy. Cop appeared before the parlement and, upon failing to obtain the support of the king or the university, was forced to flee. He fled in secret, arriving in time at Basel. Cop traveled until reaching Basel in February 1534 and then went to Freiburg with Erasmus and Ludwig Baer. He made contact with the reformers in Strassburg and Ludovicus Carinus or Ludwig Carinus, whom he had known well in Paris. King Francis I during the furor created by Cop's brief tenure as rector referred to "the cursed Lutherans." Calvin, implicated in Cop's offense, was himself forced into hiding for the next year.

Nicolas Cop was befriended by the King's sister Marguerite de Navarre. He used his post to rehabilitate her work "Le miroir de l'âme pécheresse" (The mirror of the sinful soul). In January 1535, Calvin joined Cop in Basel, a city that had come under the influence of the reformer Johannes Oecolampadius. Cop traveled again to Paris where he earned his medical licence in May 1536. In the following year he was called to Scotland, where illness had struck the newly married Madeleine of France. Nicolas Cop also taught medicine at the university of Paris, but died suddenly in the winter of 1539/1540. Protestant relatives of Nicolas Cop eventually took refuge in the Rheinland where his surname became Germanized to "Kob," before soon being anglicized in the American colonies as Cope.
