= Michel Cop =

Swiss Protestant reformer

Michel Cop (1501 – 18 September 1566) was a Swiss Protestant Reformer. He was brother of Nicolas Cop and friend of John Calvin.

Cop was the second son of Guillaume Cop, a native of Basel who had become physician to the king of France, Francis I. Michel served as a cathedral canon for several years before he became evangelical in his thinking. He and his brother Nicolas became part of the humanist–evangelical circle which flourished in Paris in the early 1530s. They were both forced to flee the city in 1534 after Nicolas preached a sermon in favour of the Reformation, which created a Catholic backlash. Michel went to Basel, and remained there until 1545, at which time he moved to Geneva, where he served as a minister until his death. He was created a bourgeois in 1554.

Scott Manetsch notes that "throughout the 1540s, Calvin worked tirelessly to construct a pastoral company of men who were committed to the reformed faith, competent in their pastoral duties, and loyal to him – and no one satisfied these requirements any better than Michel Cop." Calvin described Cop as "a man of exceptional piety and doctrine" with an intelligence "more profound than his appearance suggests."

== Publications ==
- Exposition sur les proverbes de Salomon (1556; published in English as An Exposition upon the Fyrste Chap. of the Proverbis of Salomon, 1564)
- Le livre de l'Ecclésiaste, autrement dit le Prescheur (1557; published in English as A Faithful and Familiar Exposition of Ecclesiastes)
