= George Lokert =

Scottish philosopher and theologian

George Lokert of Ayr (c. 1485 – 1547) was a Scottish philosopher and theologian who made significant contributions to the study of logic. A pupil of John Mair, he also studied and taught at the University of Paris, and eventually served as prior of the Sorbonne. Returning to Scotland in 1521, he served as Rector of the University of St Andrews (1522-5).

Returning to Paris, he was closely associated with Noël Béda.

After his second period in Paris, Lokert served as the provost of Crichton, and dean of the University of Glasgow.
