= Élie Vinet =

French humanist

Élie Vinet (1509–1587) was a French Renaissance humanist, known as a classical scholar, translator and antiquary.

== Life ==
Vinet was born at Vinets, in the commune of Saint Médard, near Barbezieux in what is now Charente. Brought up at Barbezieux, he studied at Angoulême, then at Poitiers, where he graduated M.A. At the court of Cognac he associated with Louise de Savoie, and also Marguerite d'Angoulême, princess of France and future Queen of Navarre. He then went to Paris to master Greek and mathematics.

In 1539 André de Gouveia invited Vinet to become regent at the Collège de Guyenne, founded in 1533 in Bordeaux. Leaving aside some travels to Coimbra and Paris, he taught there until his death; during much of his time he was principal of the college. He formed its teaching and discipline. Joseph Juste Scaliger was one of his pupils, and he kept up a correspondence with numerous scholars which survives through letters exchanged with Pierre Daniel of Orléans.

== Works ==
In 1546, he published the first translation into French of the Life of Charlemagne of Eginhard. He worked on the Roman remains at Bordeaux, making attempts at reconstruction. He wrote

- L'Antiquité de Bordeaux et celle d'Angoulême (1567);
- L'Antiquité de Saintes et de Barbezieux (1568); and
- L'Antiquité de Bourdeaus et de Bourg présentée au Roi Charles neufiesme (1574).

His many translations included Ausonius and Catullus. He commented on the De die natali of Censorinus. His other interests covered science, in particular sundials, and he wrote a work La Manière de faire le solaire que communément on appelle cadrans.
