= Diogo de Teive (humanist) =

Portuguese humanist (c.1514 - after 1569)

- Born: c. 1514; Braga, Portugal
- Died: after 1569; Portugal
- Occupation: Humanist

Diogo de Teive (c. 1514 in Braga – after 1569) was a Portuguese humanist during the Renaissance.

Diogo de Teive was a humanist, a latinist and a typical scholar of his day: a traveller, who spent most of his formative years abroad, in Europe. He would return to Portugal with André de Gouveia, George Buchanan and João da Costa, thanks to the initiative of King John III of Portugal.

Buchanan, João da Costa and Diogo de Teive were accused of Protestantism by the Portuguese Inquisition, and sentenced to imprisonment in 1550. Nonetheless, Teive did not leave the country, and he remained close to the Portuguese royal family and to the court, as a scholar and a clergyman. He died after 1569.

Diogo de Teive wrote tragedies and diverse tests of historical and philosophical interpretation, always in Latin.
