= College of Guienne =

The College of Guienne (French: Collège de Guyenne) was a school founded in 1533 in Bordeaux. The collège became renowned for the teaching of liberal arts between the years 1537 and 1571, attracting students such as Michel de Montaigne.

== History ==
In 1533, the Jurade of Bordeaux (roughly equivalent to the city council) called teachers from Flanders and from Paris to create the Collège de Guyenne. On 15 July 1534 André de Gouveia, then rector of the University of Paris for the college of arts (liberal arts), was invited to be principal and was given full freedom to modernize the old college according to the Renaissance humanism ideals.

The College of Guienne had Latin studies, and introduction to Ancient Greek and Hebrew - like the contemporary Collège de France - On arrival, Gouveia proclaimed that he would not recognize differences of creed in staff and pupils, many of whom showed sympathy to the new doctrines of the Protestant Reformation.

There, in 1539, Gouveia welcomed George Buchanan, appointing him professor of Latin. Gouveia's stay at the College de Guyenne lasted until 1547, attracting students like Michel de Montaigne, who later in his Essays described Gouveia as " ...behind comparison the greatest principal in France." The fame of the teaching -mainly grammar, classical literature, history and philosophy - was such that, in 1552, Italian scholar and physician Julius Caesar Scaliger sent his sons to the college, including Joseph Justus Scaliger.

The regulations of the Collège de Guyenne were published by Elie Vinet in 1583 under the title Schola Aquitanica.

== Teachers ==
- André de Gouveia
- Mathurin Cordier
- Élie Vinet
- Guillaume Guérante
- George Buchanan
- Jean Visagier
- Jacques Peletier du Mans
- Robert Balfour
- Marc-Antoine Muret
- Nicolas de Grouchy
- Mark Alexander Boyd

== Alumni ==
- Michel de Montaigne
- Étienne de La Boétie
- Louis William Valentine DuBourg
- Joseph Justus Scaliger
- Francisco Sanches

== See also ==
- Collège de France
