= Jan Standonck =

Flemish priest

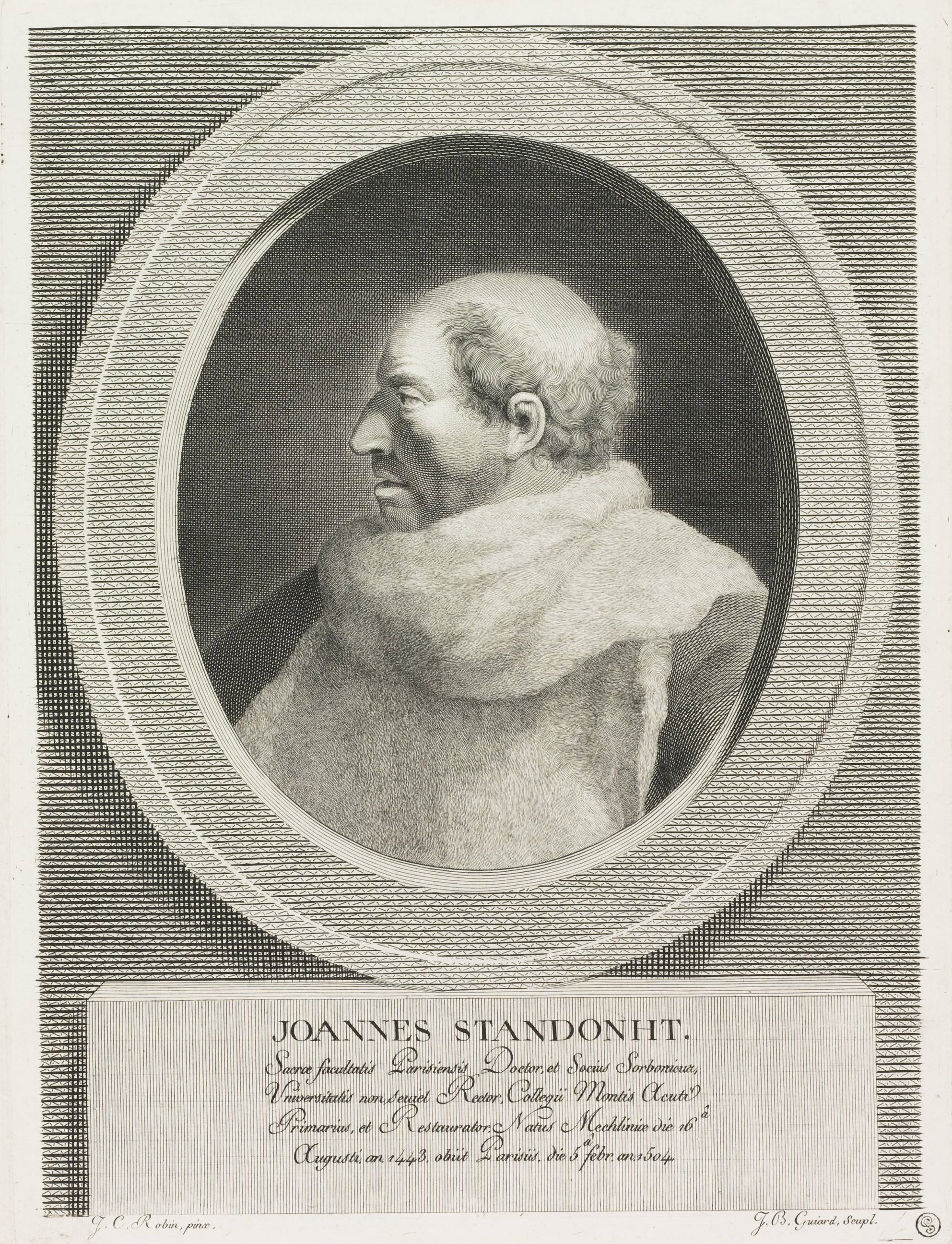

Jan Standonck (or Jean Standonk; 16 August 1453 – 5 February 1504) was a Flemish priest, Scholastic, and reformer.

He was part of the great movement for reform in the 15th-century French church. His approach was to reform the recruitment and education of the clergy, along very ascetic lines, heavily influenced by the hermit saint Francis of Paola. To this end he founded many colleges, all of them strictly controlled and dedicated to poor students with real vocations. Chief amongst them was the Collège de Montaigu, latterly part of the University of Paris. He lived at a time when this model of reform was under increasing pressure from more thoroughgoing critiques—including that of one of his most famous students, Erasmus.

== Early years ==
He was born in Mechelen (at that time part of the Burgundian Netherlands) into extremely humble circumstances, the son of a poor cobbler. He received his early education there but quickly transferred to Gouda, where the Brothers of the Common Life ran a famous school along monastic lines. Here Jan developed his preference for a mystical, as opposed to an intellectual, approach to religion, together with a determinedly ascetic approach to religious life. The education he received from the Brothers was a traditional Medieval one, including Grammar and Logic, conducted during long days, interrupted by religious devotions, and accompanied by frugal meals, cold beds and many punishments. However, the ancient writers were not neglected—Virgil, Ovid, Horace, Cicero and Cato were much studied with a view to producing a good Latin style and many moral messages. But he was warned against the views of these pagan authors, to counterbalance which he studied the Bible and the Church Fathers. In particular, he studied the Devotio Moderna; a mystical approach based on Thomas a Kempis's Imitation of Christ—in particular, imitation of his sufferings. Jan paid for his studies, as many poor boys did, by serving in the kitchen, or attending to richer students, and performing menial tasks, such as ringing the bell. According to the anonymous monk who was his first biographer (1519), he could not afford candles, so he read, after a hard day, high up in the bell tower by the light of the moon. He never managed to develop a good Latin style—it was apparently always rough and full of mistakes—and he knew nothing of the Greek that was kindling the enthusiasm of so many of his contemporaries, but he never lost his love of the severe religious life learned at Gouda.

On 22 November 1469 he enrolled at Leuven University but seems to have moved on to Paris very soon afterwards. Here he again performed menial services—this time for the monks of Sainte Genevieve—in return for his education. He got his degree in 1475. He was immediately asked to become Regent—that is, student-master—in the Collège de Montaigu, where he also began his (more advanced) studies in Theology. Soon afterwards, he visited a renowned Italian hermit who had been invited to France by the King, Charles VIII. This was St Francis of Paola, founder of the Minims, who had given up all possessions, (he had walked to France from Italy), including the personal use of money, and subjected himself to severe privations in terms of food, clothing, cleanliness, heat and bedding. Jan was tremendously struck by Francis's air of saintliness.

== Collège de Montaigu ==
On 30 May 1483, he became Master of the Collège de Montaigu, a home for poor students from far away. The College had been founded in 1314 by Gilles Aycelin, in Normandy, France—who was the Archbishop of Rouen from 1311 to 1319). Later that year, he was also made the librarian for the Sorbonne, the famous Theology Faculty of the University of Paris.

The College was in great disrepair when Jan Standonck took over—some of the walls were falling down. It had become known as the Collège de Montaigu, after the Archbishop's brother, and Jan was to make it famous. He imposed a very severe regime on the students. They could leave only with his permission and had to return before nightfall—he took the key from the porter every night. They wore only a single cloth gown and were given only a piece of bread each day to eat. They had to go to the door of a nearby monastery at eleven o'clock each morning to receive a hand-out of food. They were punished for the slightest fault, and were encouraged—out of pure charity—to inform of any misdemeanours, and to criticise each other's conduct. Erasmus, one of the students, later said he did not think anyone could forget—or even survive unscathed—their time at the College.

On 16 December 1485, Standonck was elected Rector of the University. The students rose up in violent protest, such was his reputation for severity and strictness. (On 10 April 1490 he made a formal complaint to the authorities that students were not attending his lectures).

== Reform of the clergy ==
In 1490 he received his Doctorate in Theology, though he never made any original contribution to Theology. He just was not interested in this abstract speculation. Indeed, in the disputations that he is recorded as having carried out, with other University Doctors, he always comes off second best. He was more interested in the practical means of salvation—in his terms, a return to poverty and complete self-denial—and these he preached, in a Flemish accent, but in powerful French. He followed the rule of Francis of Paola very strictly and preached that all priests and monks should do so too. By 1493, there were 80 students at the College. They only left when they went to a monastery or to become a parish priest. Standonck hoped by this means to reform the church. In the same year, the King had set up a Commission to examine abuses in the church and he was asked to give a lecture to them, which he did on 12 November at Tours. In this he set out a long list of demands. Most of these were familiar to church reformers—only fit and proper persons should be priests, there should be no money charged for their services, or for accepting a post. There should be free election (by fit and proper priests) of their bishops, or monks of their abbots, and all other religious positions (including teachers at the University). He added demands that the priests and monks should lead exemplary lives. This meant his by now well known strictly ascetic life—including enforcing celibacy among the clergy.

Meanwhile, his reputation for saintliness was growing. He was made a Canon of Beauvais on 11 November 1493. In the following year, he asked the monks of Chartreux to oversee the spiritual welfare of his college, which he had set on a firmer footing, with regular rules, approved by the Chapter of Notre Dame Cathedral. The Admiral of France, Louis Malet de Graville gave him a property which brought in 120 livres a year, which he used for the College. The Admiral also paid for a new building. He got another gift to the same value the following year from Jean de Rochechouart, which he dedicated to the college. When he preached at St Georges at Abbéville during Lent in 1496, the only payment he asked for was some black and grey cloth to clothe his students.

In 1498, king Manuel I of Portugal complained officially to France for the sale of Portuguese merchandise taken by French corsairs via Admiral Graville. To appease the king, Standonck offered two scholarships for worthy Portuguese students in the college. The king accepted, becoming a benefactor of Collège de Montaigu, sending Diogo de Gouveia to study there in 1499.

== Reform spreads ==
His message of a reformed clergy was in great demand (though he had to call for armed help from the Admiral's men to evict an Augustinian friar from the pulpit at Abbéville). Later that year he tried to bring a heretic to see the error of his ways. Jean Langlois was a priest who had travelled widely—in Spain, Provence, Italy and Bohemia where he had picked up some dangerous ideas. On 3 June 1496 he pushed the priest serving Mass at Notre Dame Cathedral and scattered the Hosts from the chalice before stamping all over them and declaring the idea of the real presence of Christ in them to be a superstition. He was also a brother of one of Standonck's students, so Jan visited him in prison to try to get him to repent, which he did. However, when he learned he was to be handed over to the civil authorities—to be put to death—he retracted his repentance. He was ceremoniously stripped of his priesthood in front of Notre Dame, and the public executioner chopped off the hand that had offensively touched the sacred chalice. He was then put backwards on a donkey and led to the pig market to be burned. Standonck followed him all the way, preaching and imploring him to repent until he was so exhausted he could not speak. Langlois repented just as he was being burned. Standonck declared that from henceforth he would maintain a strict Lenten fast.

The demands for his services were so much that he had to go for help to the Brothers of the Common Life of Windesheim in the Netherlands, who agreed to send him six priests, led by Jean de Bruxelles, and including an interpreter. These, along with Montaigu graduates, he sent to monasteries and bishops who asked for help in reforming their priests. They would work by setting an example of a strict ascetic life of prayer and devotion. Many monks began to suspect some order of take-over. Still others began resenting the suggestion they did not know how to live a holy life, while still others felt that Standonck's approach was too extreme. He had mixed success, and the Dutch brothers returned home. He won some powerful enemies in several prestigious convents, including St Victor.

== Opposition grows ==
On 27 October 1496, the Chapter of Notre Dame Cathedral ordered all the priests in the diocese to give up any women they were living with. There was violent opposition to this. The following year he got one vote in the election for Archbishop of Rheims and Jan was persuaded to use this as a challenge to the dubious methods used by the winner, the candidate of the King. Charles VIII had died and the new king, Louis XII was crowned by the new archbishop at Rheims Cathedral on 17 December 1498. To consolidate his position, Louis divorced his wife, Jeanne, and married the widow, Queen Anne, of the late King, who had been his nephew. Jan unwisely advised the Queen against the marriage and preached against divorce (except in cases of adultery). Early the following year, he, along with the other Doctors in the University went on strike in protest against what they saw as unlawful interference in their affairs by the King. He was prominent in setting out their case. He also helped one of the more forceful opponents of the divorce escape. The King got his divorce and set about punishing his opponents. Standonck was lucky to get only two years exile. He handed over direction of the College to Noël Béda and John Mair and set off to Cambrai in his native Flanders, where he was welcomed by the Bishop.

== Last years ==
He used the time in exile to continue preaching and he founded schools, based on the rule of the Collège de Montaigu in various towns, including his hometown of Mechlin, Breda and his old University of Leuven. Later he founded one at Beauvais, where he was canon of the Cathedral. In Brussels he preached to the Archduke Philip of Austria and he visited the Brothers at Windesheim and Gouda. Louis XII, under pressure, relented in 1500, signing very fulsome testimonial on 17 April. On 21 August that year, Pope Alexander VI formally agreed to the rules Standonck had set out for his colleges and the following year, he set out to visit new ones at Valenciennes, Leyden and Haarlem, as well as re-Mechlin. In 1502, he received one vote for the Bishopric of Paris, but wisely did not follow this up. He tried to convert another heretic, but this time he failed, but he had not lost his typically medieval taste for litigation. In 1503, he took one of the College masters (Jacques Almain) to court for leaving, taking some students with him. They were ordered to return. He later fell ill with a fever, so bad that the doctors insisted he take some meat, which he did. He echoed St Francis of Assis in welcoming the fever bouts with "Welcome, Sister Fever!". He recovered a little but had a relapse in early 1504. He died during the night of 4 and 5 February, aged 50, and was immediately buried without ceremony at the door of the chapel, so that people could walk over his grave. The inscription was "Souvenez-vous du pauvre homme Standonck"—remember the poor man, Standonck.

== Influence ==
There is no doubting the tremendous influence of Standonck at the time and the college founded was for centuries one of the most prestigious in the world, producing scholars and ardent reformers of all camps, including Béda, John Mair, Erasmus and later Calvin and Loyola. His form of reform—the education of exemplary clergy—was taken over in the Catholic Reformation but was rejected by the more radical reform demanded by Luther, Calvin and Knox, for whom personal mortification rather missed the point. The Catholic reformer Erasmus agreed. His judgement on Jan Standonk was that his intentions were good, but he lacked judgement. Erasmus's own judgement on the Collège de Montaigu was brutal indeed. Others—John Mair, for example—looked back on it with immense gratitude and respect.
