= Collège de Montaigu =

College of the University of Paris

Coordinates: 48°50′49″N 2°20′47″E

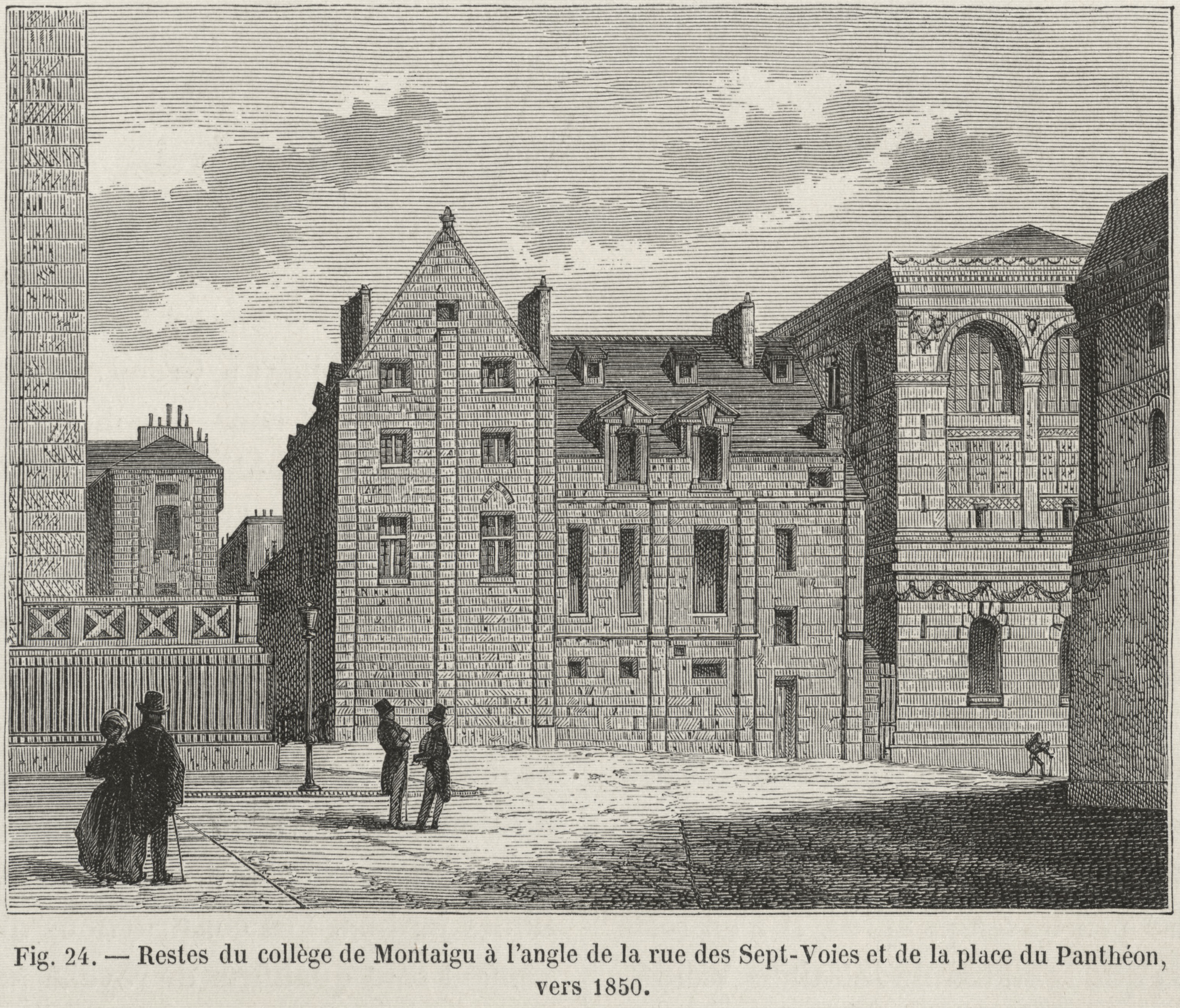
Collège de Montaigu, c. 1850

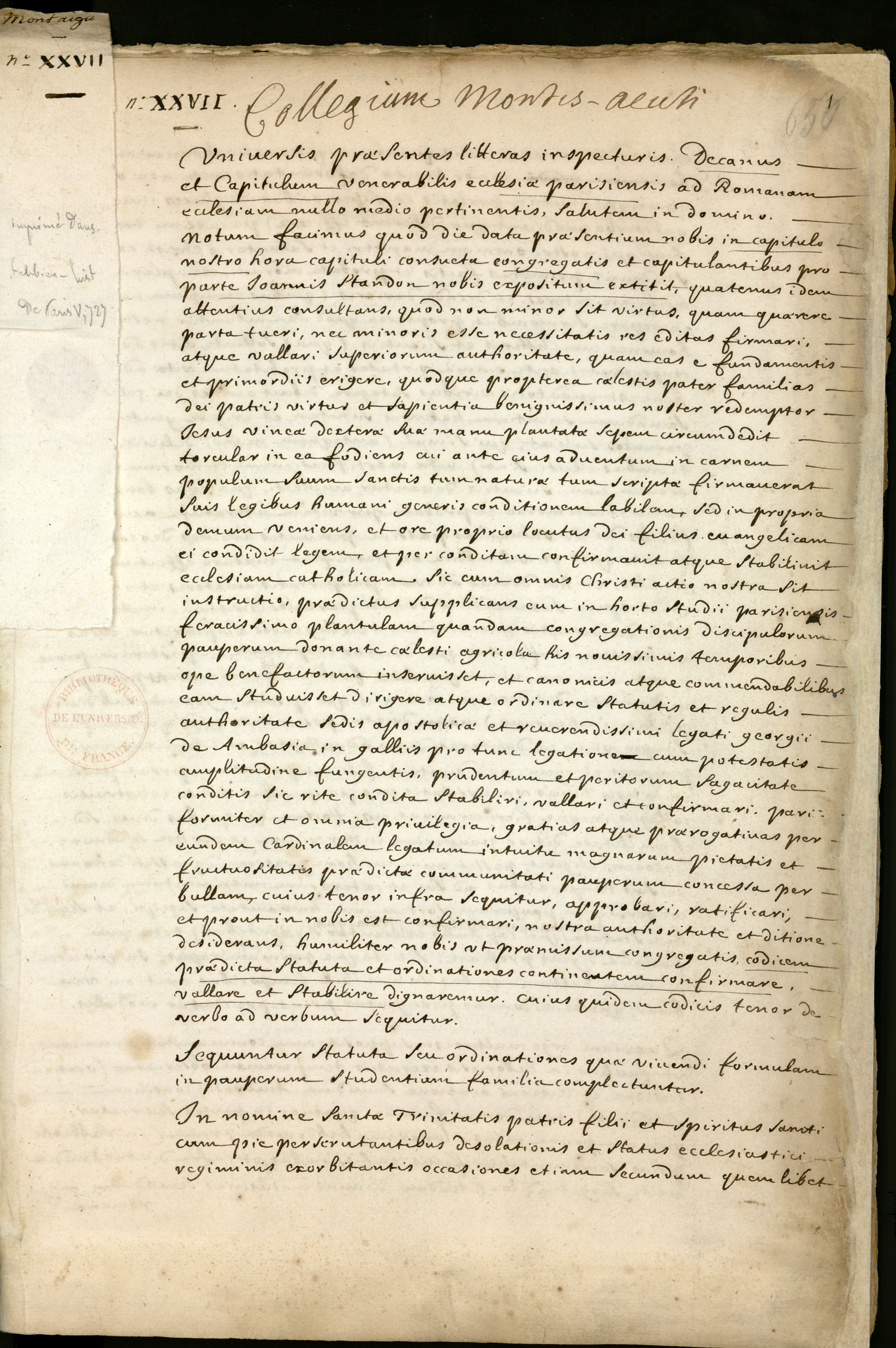
Collège de Montaigu: foundation and statutes. Latin manuscript, 17th century (Bibliothèque de la Sorbonne, NuBIS)

The Collège de Montaigu was one of the constituent colleges of the Faculty of Arts of the University of Paris.

== History ==
The college, originally called Collège des Aicelins, was founded in 1314 by Gilles I Aycelin de Montaigu, Archbishop of Narbonne and Archbishop of Rouen. It changed its name after it had been restored in 1388 by his relative Pierre Aycelin de Montaigut, Bishop of Nevers and Laon.

In 1483, Jan Standonck became Master of the College and made it prosper. Under his leadership and that of his disciple Noël Béda, Montaigu was one of the leading theological colleges of Paris. Students at the college included Erasmus of Rotterdam, John Calvin, and Ignatius of Loyola (before moving to Collège de Sainte-Barbe). Other notable students were the influential Portuguese teacher and diplomat Diogo de Gouveia. At least four Scots also attended: philosopher John Mair (who went on to teach theology there), historian Hector Boece, royal advocate Patrick Paniter and Reformer John Knox. Another Scot, George Dundas, may have also attended. Architect and educator Jean-Nicolas-Louis Durand attended before turning to architecture.

In his Colloquies Erasmus left a memoire of his time at the College under Standonck. Erasmus was a privileged paying student, but his memories were not pleasant.

During the French Revolution, In 1792, the college was closed and some of the buildings were converted into a hospital and a military prison. The prison was closed in 1836, and pulled down in 1842. In 1844–1850, the Sainte-Geneviève Library was constructed on the site.
