= Collège Sainte-Barbe =

Former college in Paris

Coordinates: 48°50′51″N 2°20′48″E

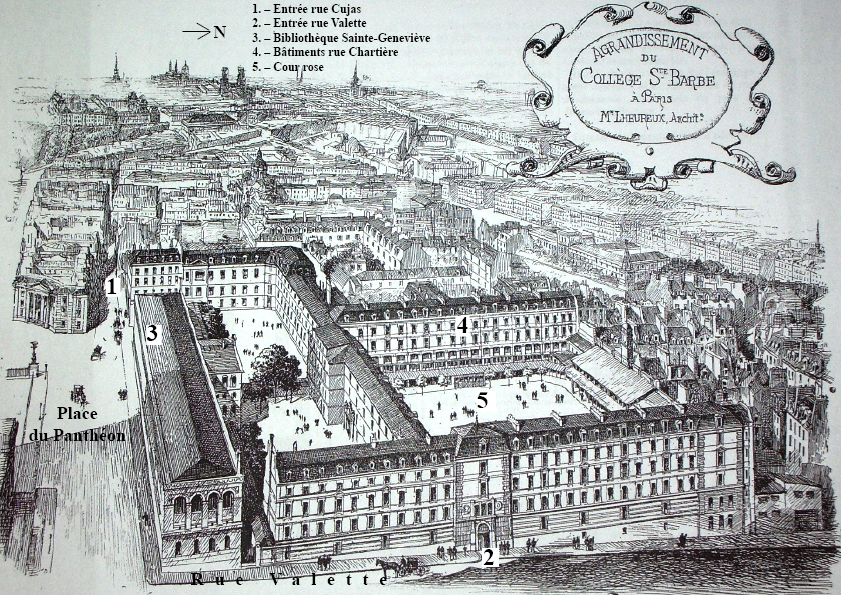
Collège Sainte-Barbe.

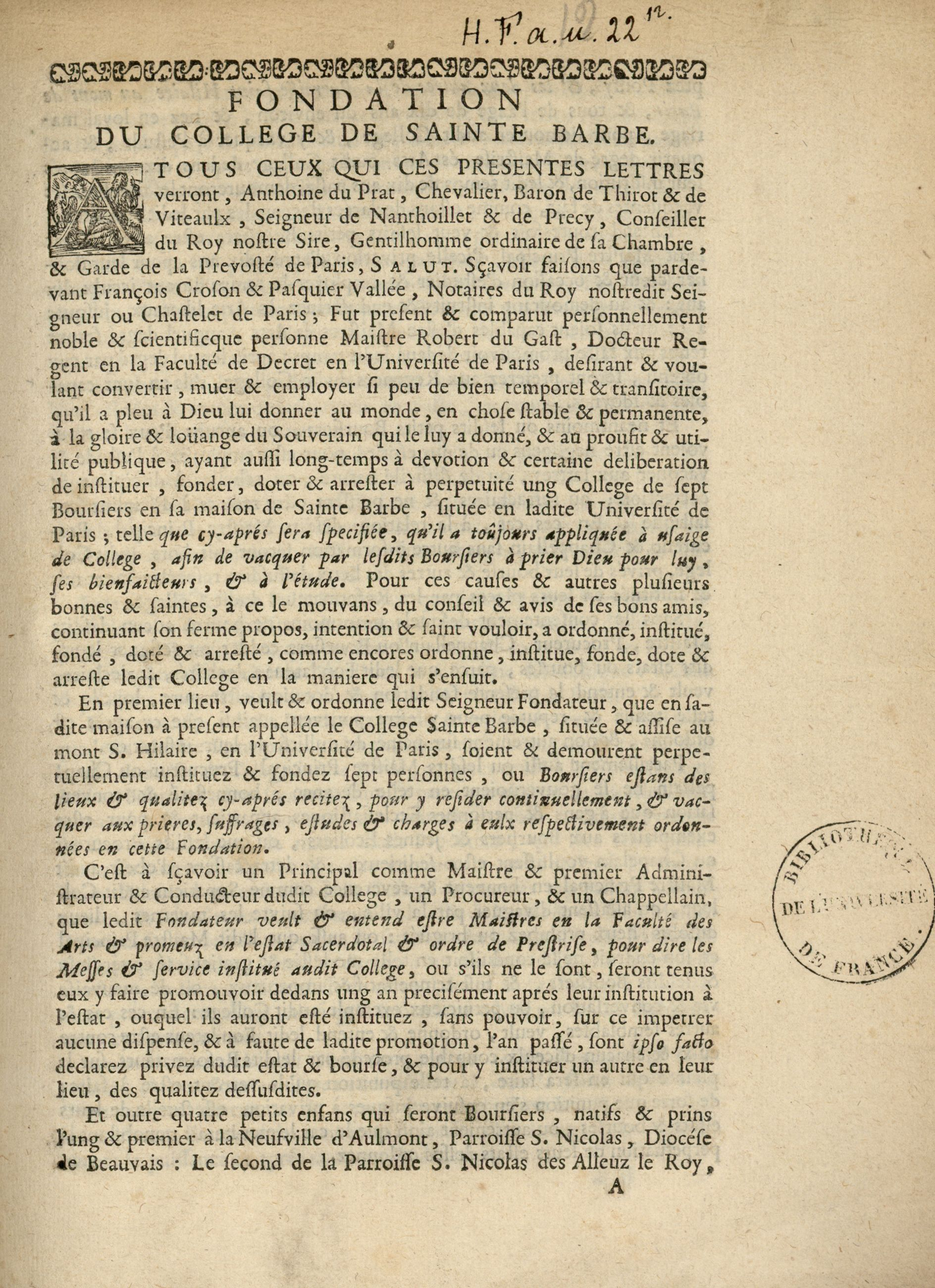
Collège Sainte-Barbe (Paris): foundation. Print by du Gast, Robert, 1556? (Bibliothèque de la Sorbonne, NuBIS)

The Collège Sainte-Barbe (French pronunciation: [kɔlɛʒ sɛ̃t baʁb]) is a former college in the 5th arrondissement of Paris, France.

The Collège Sainte-Barbe was founded in 1460 on Montagne Sainte-Geneviève (Latin Quarter, Paris). It was until its closure in June 1999 the oldest identified college of Paris.

The building of the former college now houses the Bibliothèque Sainte-Barbe, and was registered as a historical monument on 9 December 1999.

The Barbiste Spirit is kept alive through the Friendly Association of Old Barbistes, founded in 1820, recognized a public society since 1880, which is the oldest association of alumni of France, "l'Association Amicale des Anciens Barbistes".

== Alumni ==
Former Barbists (ordered by date of birth) include:

- Diogo de Gouveia (1471–1557)
- Ignace de Loyola (1491–1556)
- André de Gouveia (1497–1548)
- St. François-Xavier (1506–1552), Roman Catholic missionary to India, China, and Southeast Asia
- Pierre Lefevre (1506–1546)
- Guillaume Postel (1510–1581)
- Achilles Statius (1524–1581)
- Michel Adanson (1727–1806), naturalist)
- Jean Baptiste Louis Romé de Lisle (1736–1790), founder of crystallography
- Jacques-Étienne Montgolfier (1745–1799)
- Eugène Scribe (1791–1861), dramatist and librettist
- Felix Dupanloup (1802–1878), bishop
- James Manby Gully (1808–1883), pioneer of hydrotherapy
- Warren De la Rue (1815–1889), British astronomer
- Gustave Eiffel (1832–1923), engineer
- Sarkis Balyan (Armenian: Սարգիս Պալեան; 1835–1899)
- Arsène d'Arsonval (1851–1940), physicist and doctor
- Constantin Costa-Foru (26 October 1856 – 15 August 1935)
- Alfred Dreyfus (1859–1939)
- Jean Jaurès (1859–1914)
- Émile Borel (1871–1956), mathematician
- Enrique Zóbel de Ayala (born 1877), patriarch of the Filipino billionaire family of Zobel de Ayala
- Charles Péguy (1873–1914)
- Louis Blériot (1872–1936) Engineer and pioneer aviator
- Henri-George Clouzot (1907–1977), scenario writer
- the actors Michel Piccoli (born 1925)
- Claude Lelouch (born 1937), scenario writers
- Bernard Kouchner (born 1939)
- François Berléand (born 1952)

== Former faculty ==
Among the former professors are the historian Jules Michelet (1798–1874) and the journalist Serge July (born 1942).

== Buildings ==
The buildings of the college have undergone numerous modifications since its establishment in 1460. A university library, the Sainte-Barbe Library, opened to the public in March 2009.
