= List of University of Zaragoza people =

This is a list of University of Zaragoza people, including notable alumni and staff.

== Notable alumni ==
=== Science/Math/Academics ===
- Santiago Ramón y Cajal, awarded the Nobel Prize in Physiology or Medicine in 1906 and is widely recognized as the father of modern neuroscience. A mention of his famous brain cell drawings was made in episode 16 of season 6, “The Tangible Affection Proof”, of The Big Bang Theory television show
- María Yzuel, Spanish physicist and SPIE President in 2009
- Gaspar Lax, Spanish philosopher and mathematician
- Fidel Pagés, developer of the epidural anesthesia technique, he received his degree in Medicine and Surgery with honors in 1908
- Jerónimo Blancas, historian and scholar, published the treatise Aragonensium rerum commentarii

=== Business ===
- César Alierta, Chief Executive Officer and Chairman of Telefónica S.A.

=== Artists/Writers ===
- Antonio Mingote, Spanish cartoonist and writer
- Dino Valls, Spanish Painter
- José Antonio Labordeta, singer/songwriter of “Aragón” and “Canto a la Libertad”, and the founder of the Andalán newspaper
- José Martí, national Cuban hero, writer and recognized as one of the great Latin American intellects of the 1800s
- Juan Loreno Palmireno, Spanish poet, author and playwright
- Lupercio and Bartolomé de Argensola, brothers and Spanish poets
- Maria Moliner, librarian and lexicographer, known for her Diccionario de uso del español (Dictionary of Spanish use)
- Fernando Lázaro Carreter, President (1992–98) of the Royal Spanish Academy (Real Academia Española), the official royal institution responsible for overseeing the Spanish language.
- Fernando Aramburu, poet, narrator and essayist, awarded Premio de la Crítica to the best narrative in Spanish in 2017. He earned his degree in Hispanic Philology from the University of Zaragoza in 1982.

=== Politics/Law ===
- Jordan de Asso, jurist, historian and naturalist
- Manuel Azaña, 2nd President of the Second Spanish Republic, served as 55th and 63rd Prime Minister of Spain. He earned his degree in Law in 1897
- Manuel de Roda, Ambassador in Rome under King Fernando VI and Ministry of "Grace and Justice" under King Carlos III of Spain
- Xabier Arzalluz, Spanish Basque nationalist politician
- María Elósegui, Spanish professor and judge
- Sara Giménez Giménez, Spanish Roma lawyer and political activist
- Maira Mariela Macdonal Alvarez, Bolivian diplomat and one of the Vice-Presidents of the United Nations Human Rights Council

=== Religion ===
- Pedro Apaolaza, archbishop of Zaragoza (1635–1643)

=== Celebrity ===
- Adriana Abenia, model, actress and TV Personality

== Notable emeritus faculty ==
- Pedro Simón Abril, Known for his translations of work by famous philosophers such as Aristotle, Plato and others; also a primary figure in the Spanish humanism movement of the 16th century (1530–1595)
- Matías Barrio y Mier, historian of law, chair of Geografia Historica 1874, Carlist political leader (1844–1909)
- Salvador Minguijón Adrián, historian of law, chair of Historia General del Derecho Español 1911–1933, 1936–1938 (1874–1959)
