= Alvaro Thomaz =

Portuguese mathematician (fl. 1500–1521)

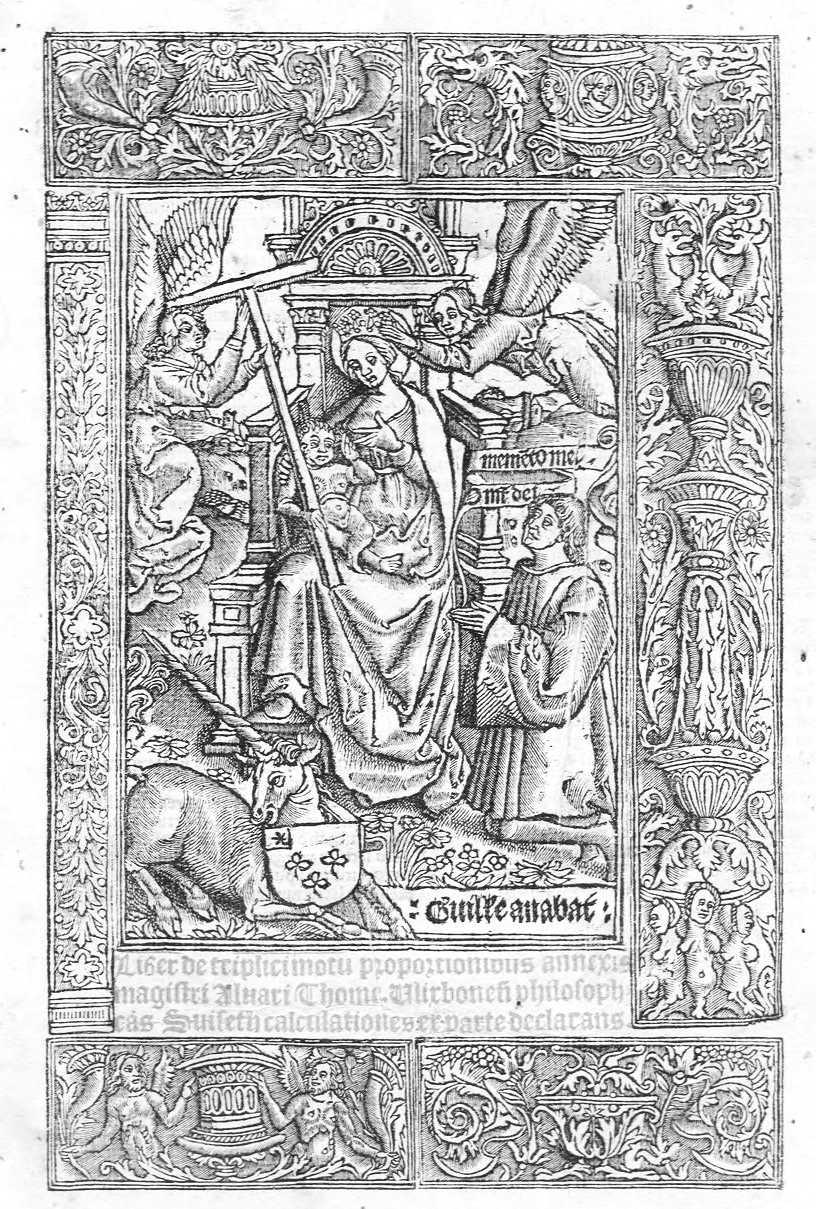
Title page of Liber de triplici motu

Alvaro Thomaz, Alvarus Thomaz, or Álvaro Tomás (fl. 1500–1521) was a Portuguese mathematician in the tradition of calculatores. He is known from his book Liber de triplici motu proportionibus annexis magistri published in 1509 which examined the work of the Merton College calculators of England.

== Biography ==
Thomaz was born in Lisbon and studied at the University of Paris, where he later taught between 1510 and 1521. He studied medicine alongside mathematics and obtained a doctorate in 1518. He taught for several years at the Collège de Coqueret, where his colleagues included the Scot Robert Caubraith. During this period, he was closely associated with the Spanish scholar Juan de Celaya, who later taught at the College of Santa Barbara. Little is known of Thomaz's life after 1521, with no records of his subsequent activities or date of death.

== Work and contributions ==
Thomaz's major work, Liber de triplici motu proportionibus annexis magistri philosophicas Suiseth calculationes ex parte declarans, published in Paris in 1509, provided a mathematical foundation for understanding the Calculationes of Richard Swineshead. The treatise was structured similarly to the Tractatus proportionum of Albert of Saxony but was explicitly designed as a commentary on Swineshead's text. Thomaz's work was considered superior to earlier Italian attempts at explicating the calculatory tradition, particularly the similar effort by Bassano Politi.

Thomaz's advancement over earlier writers such as Swineshead, William of Heytesbury, and Nicole Oresme lay primarily in his systematic organisation of the material and his sophisticated treatment of mathematical problems related to the convergence of series. The work includes detailed studies of infinite series and examinations of the physics of motion. Throughout his treatise, Thomaz engages critically with his predecessors, occasionally disagreeing with Swineshead, Heytesbury, and Oresme on points of detail.

Thomaz was well-versed in the intellectual controversies of his day, demonstrating awareness of the disputes between nominalists and Scotist realists, as well as the intermediary position of Thomas Aquinas as explained by John Capreolus. His erudition is evident in his engagement with an extensive range of earlier scholars.

== Influence ==
Thomaz's reputation was such that he became known as the "Calculator" par excellence at Paris at the end of the first decade of the sixteenth century. His influence was considerable, with significant portions of his treatise being excerpted and incorporated into important physics texts of the following decade, including the Perscrutationes physicae of Luis Coronel (1511) and the Expositio in libros physicorum of Juan de Celaya (1517).

His work continued to be cited by later Spanish scholars throughout the sixteenth century. Pedro Margallo referenced "Neotericus Albarus" in his writings, while Diego de Astudillo made frequent references to "Alvarus Thomas" in his questions on Aristotle's De generatione et corruptione. The influential Dominican scholar Domingo de Soto incorporated essentials of Thomaz's treatises into his own work, although he rarely mentioned his sources by name.

Reception of Thomaz's work was mixed among later scholars. While some, like Soto, valued and transmitted his insights, others were more critical. The Spanish Augustinian Alonso de la Veracruz, for instance, criticised the time spent by writers such as Thomaz on intricate calculatory problems, suggesting that one could aptly apply the biblical text "We have laboured all the night and taken nothing" to Alvaro's work.

== Intellectual context ==
Thomaz was familiar with an impressive array of scholarly traditions. His work shows knowledge of Nicomachus, Boethius, Johannes Campanus, Jordanus de Nemore, Euclid, Thomas Aquinas, Robert Holcot, Duns Scotus, Albert of Saxony, Marsilius of Inghen, Gregory of Rimini, John Major Paul of Venice, Jacopo da Forlì , Saint Cajetan, Giovanni di Casali, André of Neufchâteau, Pietro Pomponazzi, and Pietro d'Abano. He also cited Walter Burley, Thomas Bradwardine, William of Heytesbury, Nicole Oresme, Paul of Venice, Gaetano da Thiene, and Bassano Politi, demonstrating his comprehensive knowledge of both English sources and their elaboration by Paris terminists and Italian commentators. Thomaz stood at the intersection of several intellectual traditions, working to synthesise and advance mathematical physics during a period of significant transition in European thought.
