= Politis =

Politis may refer to

== Media ==
- Politis (Cyprus), a daily newspaper
- Politis (magazine), a weekly left-wing French magazine

== People ==
- Athanase George Politis (1893–1968), Greek diplomat and historian
- Dimitris Politis (born 1995), Greek footballer
- Fotos Politis (1890–1934), Greek stage director
- Kostas Politis (1942–2018), Greek basketball player
- Konstantinos Politis (archaeologist), Greek archaeologist
- Lampros Politis (born 1995), Greek footballer
- Nikolaos Politis (1872–1942), Greek diplomat
- Nick Politis (born 1944), Australian businessman
- Nikos E. Politis (died 2005), Greek writer, journalist, and historian
- Vasilis Politis (born 1963), Greek philosopher

== See also ==
- Politi (disambiguation)
