= Dullaert =

Dullaert may refer to:

== People ==
- Heiman Dullaert (1636–1684), Dutch Golden Age painter and poet
- Jan Dullaert (c.1480–1513), Flemish philosopher and logician

== Places ==
- Old name for the Braakman
