= Politi =

Politi may refer to:

== Persons ==
- Adriano Politi (1542–1625), Italian translator, philologist and classical scholar
- Alessandro Politi (1679–1752), Italian philologist
- Andrew Politi (born 1996), American professional baseball pitcher
- Bassano Politi (died in 16th century), Italian mathematician
- Gerolamo Politi (died 1575), Italian Roman Catholic prelate who served as Bishop of Trevico
- Giancarlo Politi (1937–2026), Italian art critic and publisher
- Lancelotto Politi (religious name Ambrosius Catharinus) (1483–1553), Italian Dominican canon lawyer
- Leo Politi (1908–1996), Italian-American artist and author
- Marco Politi (born 1947), Italian journalist and writer
- Nicolò Politi (1117–1167), Italian Roman Catholic monk and hermit
- Odorico Politi (1785–1846), Italian painter
- Paul Politi (born 1943), American songwriter

== Others ==
- Police of Denmark
- Norwegian Police Service

== See also ==
- Politis (disambiguation)
