= Antonio da Rho =

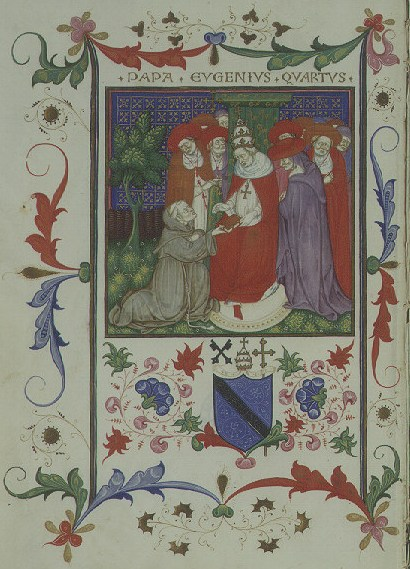
Presentation miniature showing Antonio da Rho handing a copy of his Dialogi tres in Lactentium to Pope Eugene IV

Antonio da Rho (1395–1447) was a Milanese Franciscan humanist.

Rho studied rhetoric and theology in Padua between 1414 and 1423. From 1423, he taught theology in Milan. After 1430, he held a chair in rhetoric. He also served as a court orator to Duke Filippo Maria Visconti. In 1436, he attended the Council of Basel because of his knowledge of Greek and Latin.

Rho read widely in the classics, wrote many works and engaged in several high-profile controversies. He is known for his friendship with Lorenzo Valla, which soured into an exchange of insults. Between 1429 and 1432, he attacked Antonio Beccadelli's Hermaphroditus. He wrote an Apology to defend his learning against Franciscan critics and a set of three dialogues wherein he criticizes the theology of Lactantius.

== Life ==
Of humble origins, Rho received an early education under Antonio Loschi around 1402. Rho joined the Franciscan Order at the age of eighteen in 1413. A native of Milan, he probably joined at San Francesco Grande. As a postulant, he studied dialectic in Padua from 1414 to 1417. One of his first teachers was Jacopo da Forlì. He studied theology at the convent of Sant'Antonio in Padua, graduating with a master's degree in 1423. He immediately took up a professorship of theology at San Francesco Grande, where he taught for the rest of his life. In 1427, he was passed over for appointment to an open chair of theology at Milan Cathedral. In 1430, he succeeded to Gasparino Barzizza's chair of rhetoric at San Francesco.

Rho subsequently left Milan on only three known occasions. In 1425, he visited his sister in Brescia. Sometime before 1428, he visited the Visconti Library in Pavia. Between 1429 and 1432, he engaged in polemics, including exchanges of epigrams, with Antonio Beccadelli over the latter's erotic Hermaphroditus, which he considered bad art. Sometime before 1430, he began serving as the court orator of Duke Filippo Maria Visconti, delivering the annual oration on the anniversary of his accession (June 16). He was still performing this service as late as about 1444.

In 1433, Lorenzo Valla praised his secular learning and spiritual wisdom. He made Rho the model of Christian preaching in his De vero falsoque bono. In 1436, Rho attended the Council of Basel as one "proficient in both languages". In 1439, he was a ducal judge dlegate in a case involving the Humiliati. In 1444, he gave the funeral oration for the mercenary captain Niccolò Piccinino. In 1445, Nicolò Arcimboldi wrote to Rho claiming that "all who contemplate the salvation of their soul flock to you alone as though to the city's oracle." In 1446, he was one of a small group of spiritual advisors to Filippo Maria Visconti during a crisis of conscience.

Rho's health is recorded as failing in 1444–1446. He probably died in 1447, although older sources often give a date of 1450. He was deceased when Flavio Biondo wrote his Italia illustrata in 1453.

== Works ==
Rho's works in Latin include:

- Apologia adversus archidiaconum quempiam complicesque sycophantas taeterrimos [Apology against a Certain Archdeacon and his Loathsome Sycophant Accomplices] (1428)
- Exhortatoria ad scholares (1430–1431)
- Oratio ad scholares (1431–1436)
- Genealogia Scipionum atque Catonum [Genealogy of the Scipios and Catos] (by 1432)
- Philippica in Antonium Panormitam [Philippic against Antonio Panormita] (1432)
- Proemium Imitationum or De imitatione eloquentiae (1433–1443)
- Aliud proemium Imitationum (1433–1443)
- Imitationes rhetoricae [Rhetorical Imitations] (1433–1443)
- Dialogi tres in Lactentium [Three Dialogues against Lactantius] (1442–1445)
- De numero oratorio
- Ars epistulandi
- Commentaria in libris de fortuna et de bonis et malis feminis Bonini Mombritii

In addition, there survives a manuscript fragment of a quodlibetal disputation, nine orations, over twelve letters and some poems.

Rho also translated Suetonius' Lives of the Caesars into the Italian vernacular.

The Vita Homeri, a biography of Homer, has sometimes been attributed to Rho. It is actually the work of his friend, Pier Candido Decembrio, dedicated to Rho.

=== Apology ===
The Apology was written in 1428 in response to his being passed over for the chair in theology at Milan Cathedral. The Milanese clergy considered him too ignorant in theology because of his devotion to humanistic learning (studia humanitatis). In the Apology, Rho describes becoming "enthralled" to the humanities during his time in Padua. He provides an account of authors and works he had read, both ancient and modern, among them:

- Aristotle, Rhetoric
- Cicero
- Ad Herennium
- Julius Caesar
- Quintus Curtius
- Valerius Maximus
- Pliny the Elder
- Pliny the Younger
- Seneca the Younger
- Suetonius
- Plutarch (in Leonardo Bruni's translation)
- Tacitus
- Florus
- Livy
- Josephus
- Eusebius of Caesarea
- Justin, Epitome of the Philippic History of Pompeius Trogus
- Orosius
- Apuleius
- Martianus Capella, Marriage of Philology and Mercury
- Gaius Marius Victorinus, commentary on De inventione
- Lactantius
- Macrobius
- Vegetius
- Frontinus
- ?Alain of Lille, commentary on Ad Herennium
- Giles of Rome, commentary on the Rhetoric
- ?Peter of Blois, On the Rhetorical Art of Speaking
- Dante Alighieri, The Divine Comedy
- Petrarch
- Giovanni Boccaccio
- Coluccio Salutati
- Poggio Bracciolini
- Guarino Veronese
- Cencio de' Rustici
- Francesco Barbaro
- Leonardo Giustiniani

The Apology was addressed to Antonio Massa, master general of the Franciscan Order.

=== Rhetorical Imitations ===
Rhetorical Imitations is a work of Latin lexicography. It contains synonyms, idiomatic expressions and short essays presented alphabetically. First put together in 1433, it was augmented repeatedly until 1443. It survives in six manuscripts, but has never been printed.

The Imitations was the cause of a rupture in the previously good relationship between Rho and Valla. In one place, Rho criticizes a passage of Valla's as erroneous and ridicules him as a mere "elementary school teacher". Valla took exception and accused Rho of plagiarism. After Rho's death, he circulated note, Raudensiane note, attacking many of Rho's analyses. He published the note as part of his Elegantiae.

=== Three Dialogues against Lactantius ===
The Three Dialogues against Lactantius was written between early 1442 and the summer of 1445. A dedication copy was presented to Pope Eugene IV. It is still preserved in the Vatican Library. A deluxe illuminated manuscript, its production was probably financed by Count Vitaliano Borromeo.

The Dialogues is a work of fiction. The setting is Pentecost in the garden of San Francesco Grande. The discussions take place over three days. The year is 1444. The main interlocutors in the dialogue are Pier Candido Decembrio and Nicolò Arcimboldi, but Rho himself, Francesco Barbaro, Vitaliano Borromeo, Guarnerio Castiglioni and Biagio Ghiglini also play smaller roles. They were all acquaintances of Rho in real life.

In the Dialogues, Rho criticises the doctrinal errors of Lactantius. His choice of the spelling Lactentius rather than the more common Lactantius was intended to signify that Lactantius was a "babe in Christ", since Latin lactens was considered to mean "receiving milk", while lactans meant "producing milk". The name Lactantius was a sobriquet paying compliment to its bearer's eloquence, since eloquent speech was often consider "milky".

== Works cited ==
- Fubini, Riccardo (1961). "Antonio da Rho". Dizionario Biografico degli Italiani (in Italian). Vol. 3: Ammirato–Arcoleo. Rome: Istituto dell'Enciclopedia Italiana. OCLC 883370.
- Panizza, Letizia (2002). "Antonio da Rho". In Peter Hainsworth; David Robey (eds.). The Oxford Companion to Italian Literature. Oxford University Press.
- Presta, Vincenzo (1970). "Antonio da Rho". Enciclopedia Dantesca. Rome: Istituto dell'Enciclopedia Italiana.
- Rutherford, David, ed. (2005). Early Renaissance Invective and the Controversies of Antonio da Rho. Arizona Center for Medieval and Renaissance Texts and Studies.
- Rutherford, David; Schulten, Paul, eds. (2023). Antonio da Rho, Three Dialogues against Lactantius (Dialogi tres in Lactentium): Critical Latin Edition, English Translation, Introduction, and Notes. Brill.
