= Aporia =

State of puzzlement or expression of doubt, in philosophy and rhetoric

In philosophy, an aporia (Ancient Greek: ᾰ̓πορῐ́ᾱ, romanized: aporíā, lit. '"lacking passage", also: "impasse", "difficulty in passage", "puzzlement"') is a conundrum or state of puzzlement. In rhetoric, it is a declaration of doubt, made for rhetorical purpose and often feigned. The notion of an aporia is principally found in ancient Greek philosophy, but it also plays a role in modern post-structuralist philosophy, as in the writings of Jacques Derrida and Luce Irigaray, and it has also served as an instrument of investigation in analytic philosophy.

== Philosophy ==
In philosophy, an aporia is a philosophical puzzle or a seemingly irresoluble impasse in an inquiry, often arising as a result of equally plausible yet inconsistent premises, i.e., a paradox. It can also denote the state of being perplexed, or at a loss, at such a puzzle or impasse.

=== Ancient Greek philosophy ===
Plato's early dialogues are often called his 'aporetic' (Greek: ἀπορητικός) dialogues, because they typically end in aporia. In such a dialogue, Socrates questions his interlocutor about the nature or definition of a concept (e.g., virtue, courage). Socrates then, through elenctic testing, shows his interlocutor that his answer is unsatisfactory. After a number of such failed attempts, the interlocutor admits he is in aporia about the examined concept, concluding that he does not know what it is. In Plato's Meno (84a–c), Socrates describes the purgative effect of reducing someone to aporia: it shows someone who merely thought he knew something that he does not in fact know it and instills in him a desire to investigate it.

In Aristotle's Metaphysics, aporia plays a role in his method of inquiry. In contrast to a rationalist inquiry that begins from a priori principles, or an empiricist inquiry that begins from a tabula rasa, he begins the Metaphysics by surveying the various aporiai that exist, drawing in particular on what puzzled his predecessors: "with a view to the science we are seeking [i.e., metaphysics], it is necessary that we should first review the things about which we need, from the outset, to be puzzled" (995a24). Book Beta of the Metaphysics is a list of the aporiai that preoccupy the rest of the work.

In Pyrrhonism, aporia is intentionally induced as a means of producing ataraxia.

=== Modern usage ===
Contemporary academic studies of the term aporia further characterize its usage in philosophical discourses. In "Aporetics: Rational Deliberation in the Face of Inconsistency" (2009), Nicholas Rescher is concerned with the methods in which an aporia, or "apory", is intellectually processed and resolved. In his Preface, Rescher identifies the work as an attempt to "synthesize and systematize an aporetic procedure for dealing with information overload (of 'cognitive dissonance', as it is sometimes called)" (ix). The text is also useful in that it provides a more precise (although specialized) definition of the concept: "any cognitive situation in which the threat of inconsistency confronts us" (1). Rescher further introduces his specific study of the apory by qualifying the term as "a group of individually plausible but collectively incompatible theses", a designation he illustrates with the following syllogism or "cluster of contentions":

1. What the sight of our eyes tells us is to be believed.

2. Sight tells us the stick is bent.

3. What the touch of our hand tells us is to be believed.

4. Touch tells us the stick is straight. (2)

The aporia, or "apory" of this syllogism lies in the fact that, while each of these assertions is individually conceivable, together they are inconsistent or impossible (i.e. they constitute a paradox). Rescher's study is indicative of the continuing presence of scholarly examinations of the concept of aporia and, furthermore, of the continuing attempts of scholars to translate the word, to describe its modern meaning.

Aporia's role in modern post-structuralist philosophy, is reflected in the writings of Jacques Derrida and Luce Irigaray, and it has also served as an instrument of investigation in analytic philosophy. Derrida refers to three "aporias": "the epoche of the rule", "the ghost of the undecidable", and "the urgency that obstructs the horizon of knowledge".

== Rhetoric ==
Aporia is also a rhetorical device whereby the speaker expresses a doubt—often feigned—about their position or asks the audience rhetorically how the speaker should proceed. One aim of aporia may be to discredit the speaker's opponent. Aporia is also called dubitatio. For example:

I am at no loss for information about you and your family; but I am at a loss where to begin. Shall I relate how your father Tromes was a slave in the house of Elpias, who kept an elementary school near the Temple of Theseus, and how he wore shackles on his legs and a timber collar round his neck? Or how your mother practised daylight nuptials in an outhouse next door to Heros the bone-setter, and so brought you up to act in tableaux vivants and to excel in minor parts on the stage?

— Demosthenes, On The Crown, 129

== See also ==
- Antinomy
- Cognition
- Dubitative mood
- Figure of speech
- Intuition
- Rhetorical question
- Thought experiment
- Zeno's paradoxes
- Gordian knot

== Sources ==
- "Aporia". The Oxford English Dictionary (2 ed.). 1989.
- Harmon, William (2009). A Handbook to Literature. Upper Saddle River NJ: Pearson. ISBN 978-0-205-02401-8.
- Kofman, Sarah (1983). "Beyond Aporia?". In Benjamin, Andrew (ed.). Post-Structuralist Classics. London: Routledge. pp. 7–44.
- Vasilis Politis (2006). "Aporia and Searching in the Early Plato" in L. Judson and V. Karasmanis eds. Remembering Socrates. Oxford University Press.
- Rescher, Nicholas (2009). Aporetics. Pittsburgh PA: University of Pittsburgh Press. ISBN 978-0-8229-6057-7.
- Smyth, Herbert Weir (1920). Greek Grammar. Cambridge MA: Harvard University Press. p. 674. ISBN 0-674-36250-0.
