= Juan de Celaya =

Spanish scholar (c.1490–1558)

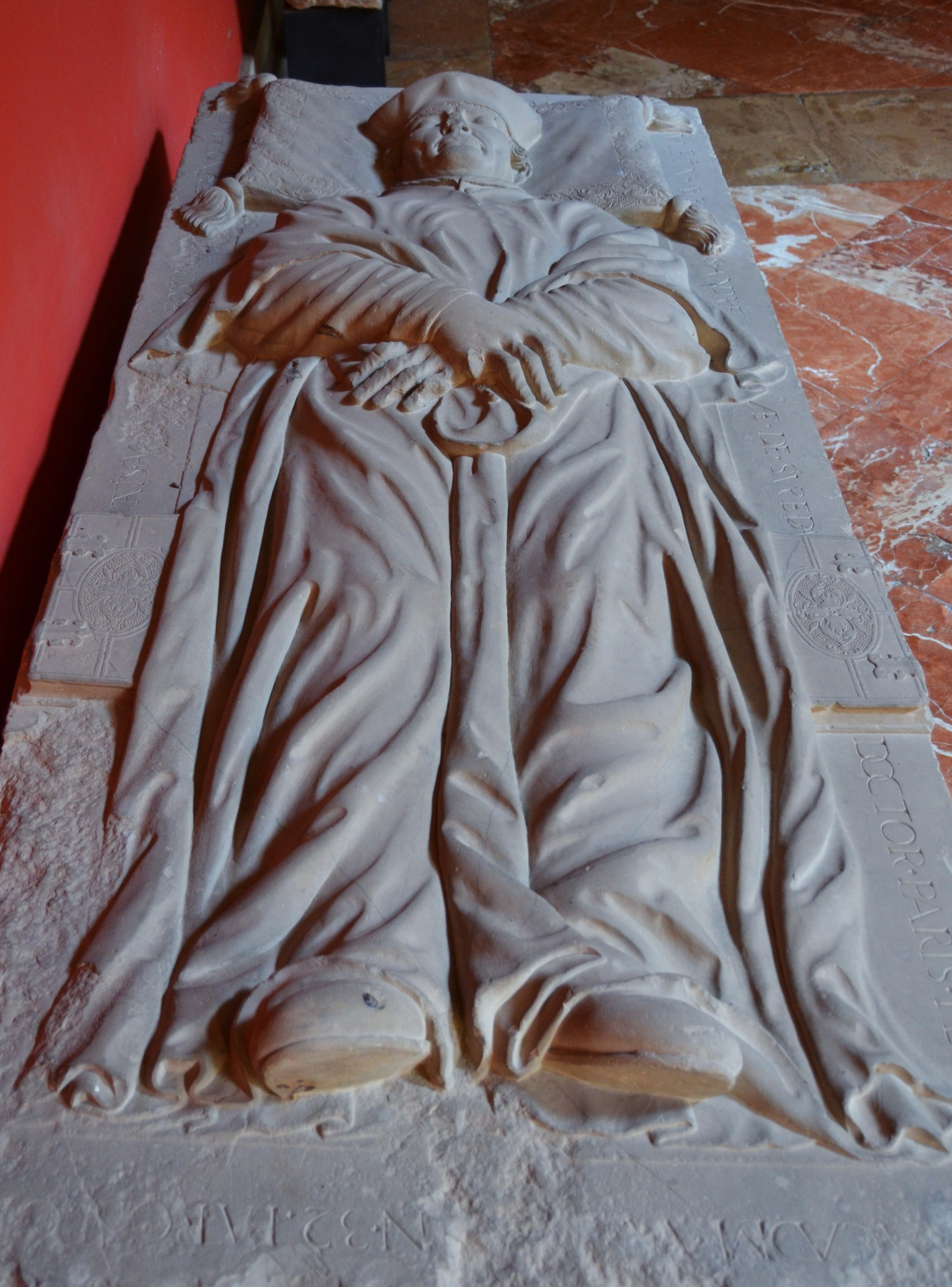
- Gravestone of Juan de Celaya, Museu de Belles Arts de València
- Born: c. 1490
- Died: December 6, 1558
- Occupations: Mathematician; Physicist; Cosmologist; Philosopher; Theologian

Education
- Education: University of Valencia; Collège de Montaigu
- Academic advisors: Jan Dullaert; Gaspar Lax

Philosophical work
- Institutions: Collège de Coqueret; Collège Sainte-Barbe; University of Valencia
- Notable students: Francisco de Vitoria; Domingo de Soto; Juan Ribeyro

Juan de Celaya (Valencia, c. 1490 – 6 December 1558) was a Spanish mathematician, physicist, cosmologist, philosopher and theologian. He was a member of the so-called Calculators, using ideas from Merton College. He is known for his work on motion (in kinetics and dynamics) and in logic.

== Life ==
The son of a minor gentleman who participated in the Reconquest of Granada, he probably studied at the University of Valencia, ending his studies in 1509 at the Collège de Montaigu, Paris. During his studies he was a student of the Nominalist Gaspar Lax and of Dullaert of Ghent, who exerted considerable influence on the ideas and works Celaya would write.

He taught Physics and Logic in the College of Coqueret from 1510 to 1515, along with Alvaro Thomaz (who was interested in physics, in particular in the study of dynamics) and the Scot Robert Galbraith (1483−1544). From 1515 to 1524 he taught at the Collège Sainte-Barbe. Among his students were Francisco de Vitoria, Francisco de Soto (who later changed his name to Domingo de Soto) and Juan Ribeyro.

He continued his theological studies, graduating on March 24, 1522 and achieving his doctorate on 21 June 1522. In 1524 he returned to his native city, and a year later became Principal and Professor of Theology at the University of Valencia, where he played an important role in the reforming the structure of studies.

== Works ==
During his time in France, Celaya was a prolific writer, dealing mainly with the physics of Aristotle, in particular the study of motion. He also published numerous works on philosophy and logic. He was one of the main promoters of nominalist logic and the Oxford Calculators ideas about Dynamics and Kinematics.

Some of his most important works are:

- Expositio in primum tractatum Summularum magistri Petri Hispani, (1515).
- Expositio in octo libros phisicorum Aristotelis, (1517).
- Libros Physicorum Aristotelis cum quaestionibus eiusdem, secundum, triplicem viam Thomae, Realium et nominalium. This is a reprint in one volume of four previous works, published between 1525 and 1531.
- In libros Aristotelis de generationes et corruptiones.

== Sources ==
- Complete Dictionary of Scientific Biography, William A. Wallace (2008)
- Wallace, W. A. Prelude to Galileo. Essays on Medieval and Sixteenth-Century Sources of Galileo's Thought, Dordrecht: Springer, 1981
- Brotóns, V. N. (2000) Matemáticas y astronomía. Historia de la Universidad de Valencia: El estudio general. ISBN 978-84-370-4223-7
- Amparo Felipo Orts (1993) La Universidad de Valencia durante el siglo XVI (1499-1611)
- Scholasticon (Database on Medieval Scholars - in French)
- La Universidad de Paris durante los Estudios de Francisco de Vitoria O.P. (1507-1522), by Ricardo G. Villoslada S.I., Gregorian University, 1938
