= María del Carmen García Herrero =

María del Carmen García Herrero (born 6 April 1959, Madrid) is the Chair of Mediaeval History of the University of Zaragoza.

García Herrero graduated at the Faculty of Geography and History of the Universidad Complutense of Madrid specialising in Mediaeval History. She defended in 1982 her dissertation on commercial relations between Castile and Aragon around the middle of the 15th century. She continued her PhD studies in the Faculty of Philosophy and Letters of Zaragoza, and defended her thesis in 1987 (Excellent cum laude). With a summary of her thesis, she obtained the Prize of Investigation of the City of Zaragoza in 1988, published as ''Mujeres de la Edad Media : actividades políticas, socioecónomicas y culturales, 1994', It is the first thesis focused in the study of the mediaeval women in Spain. It was followed by H Artesanas de vida : mujeres de la Edad Media in 2009.

García Herrerohas been a pioneer in the fields of studies about wills in the Kingdom of Aragon with a work published in 1984.

Interdisciplinary Seminar of Women Studies (SIEM) of the University of Zaragoza, she also coordinated in collaboration with Dr. Nieves Ibeas Vuelta the Interdisciplinary PhD Program “Studies of women” (1999-2000). Both set up the “Voices and feminine spaces” serie in 2000.
