= Antonio Beccadelli (poet) =

Italian poet

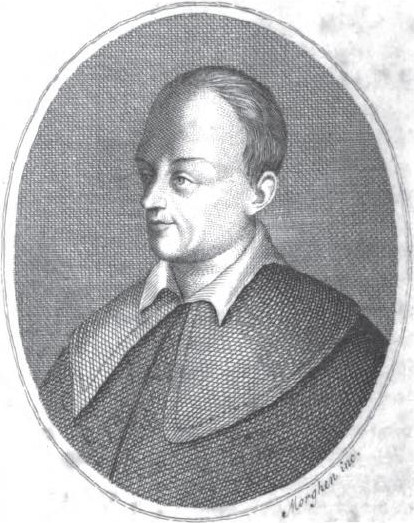
- Born: 1394; Palermo, Sicily, Italy
- Died: January 1471 (aged 76–77); Naples, Italy
- Occupations: Poet, scholar, diplomat, chronicler

Antonio Beccadelli (1394–1471), called Il Panormita (poetic form meaning "The Palermitan"), was an Italian poet, canon lawyer, scholar, diplomat, and chronicler. He generally wrote in Latin. Born in Palermo, he was the eldest son of the merchant Enrico di Vannino Beccadelli, who had played an active role in Sicilian politics, serving as Praetor of Palermo in 1393.

He helped his father with his business until he became consumed with enthusiasm for humanistic studies.

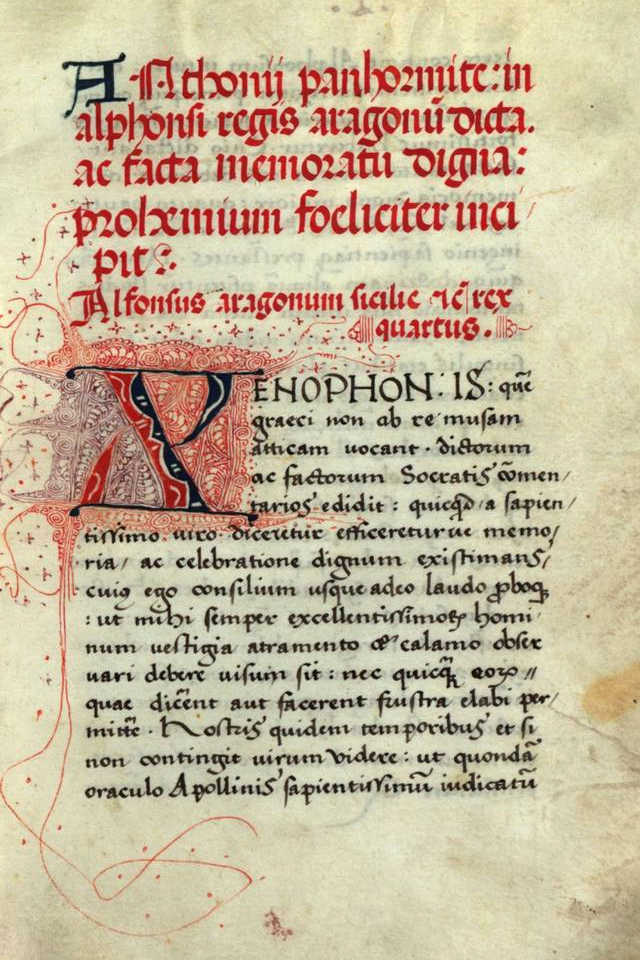
Anthonii Panhormite, in Alphonsi Regis Aragonum dicta ac facta memoratum digna.

== Travels ==
Beccadelli traveled to numerous Italian cities, and became a student of Gasparino da Barizizza in Padua. In 1419 he had stayed for a short time in Florence, and then travelled to Siena in order to study jurisprudence. He continued to Bologna and remained there until August 1427. He returned to Florence, and then left for Rome, where he stayed until 1428. In 1429, he journeyed to Genoa.

He became a guest of the Filippo Maria Visconti family at Pavia (1430–1433), where he completed his studies and entered the court of the Visconti. He would dedicate himself to philological studies, in particular to the tradition of Plautus.

== Beccadelli and King Alfonso ==
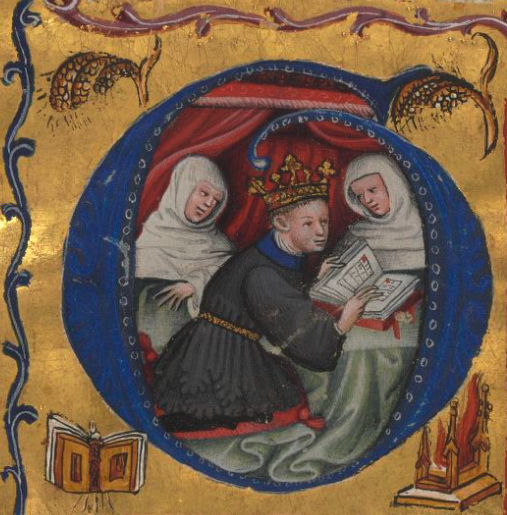
Manuscript detail of Alfonso V of Aragon

In 1434, he entered the service of Alfonso V of Aragon at Naples. Alfonso was a great patron of the arts, and in this city Beccadelli founded the academy Porticus Antoniana, later known as the Accademia Pontaniana, after Giovanni Pontano. In Naples, Beccadelli began a close friendship with Pontano, and introduced the young scholar to the royal chancery of King Alfonso.

Beccadelli and Alfonso shared a great love of culture, and Beccadelli accompanied Alfonso during the vicissitudes of the king's career. When Alfonso became a prisoner in the hands of Filippo Maria Visconti, Duke of Milan, in 1435, Alfonso persuaded his captor to let him go by making it plain that it was the interest of Milan not to prevent the victory of the Aragonese party in Naples. Beccadelli, with his former connection to the Milanese court, played a role in these negotiations.

Alfonso had been betrothed to María de Castilla (1401–1458; sister of Juan II of Castile) in Valladolid in 1408; the marriage was celebrated in Valencia during 1415. They failed to produce children. At Naples, Alfonso fell in love with a woman of noble family named Lucrezia d'Alagno, who served as a de facto queen at the Neapolitan court as well as an inspiring muse. Beccadelli paid tribute to her with these Latin words: Quantum rex proceres, quantum Sol sȳdera vincit, / tantum Campānas superat Lucrētia nymphas.

It is known that Beccadelli himself was married twice.

After Alfonso's death, Beccadelli remained close to the Crown of Aragon, and served Ferdinand I of Naples. Alfonso had entrusted Beccadelli with the instruction of his son and successor.

Beccadelli died in January 1471 at Naples.

== Hermaphroditus ==
Beccadelli is most famous for his bawdy masterpiece Hermaphroditus (1425), a collection of eighty-one Latin epigrams, which evoke the unfettered eroticism of the works of Catullus and Martial, as well as of the Priapea.

This work was greeted with acclaim by scholars but subsequently condemned and censured as obscene by Christian apologists.

Amongst those who praised this work was Guarino da Verona, who called Beccadelli a poetic scion of the Sicilian writer of antiquity, Theocritus.

Beccadelli's critics included the theologian Antonio da Rho (1395–1447), a Franciscan from Milan, who would write a Philippic against Antonio Panormita (1431/32). Panormita had written invective poetry ridiculing Rho with obscene insults, but he would have to defend not only his work but also his life and morals. Rho discredited and vilified Beccadelli by making allegations about the poet's Sicilian background, orthodoxy, and practice of sexual taboos.

== Other works ==
He also wrote the Gaulish Epistles (Epistulae gallicae) (1474) and the Campanian Epistles (Epistulae campanae) (1474)

He compiled The Sayings and Deeds of King Alfonso (De dictis et factis Alphonsi regis). He became a kind of panegyrist to Alfons V of Aragon, to whom the work refers.

He also wrote the chronicle Liber Rerum Gestarum Ferdinandi Regis (1438–1458).

== Palazzo del Panormita ==
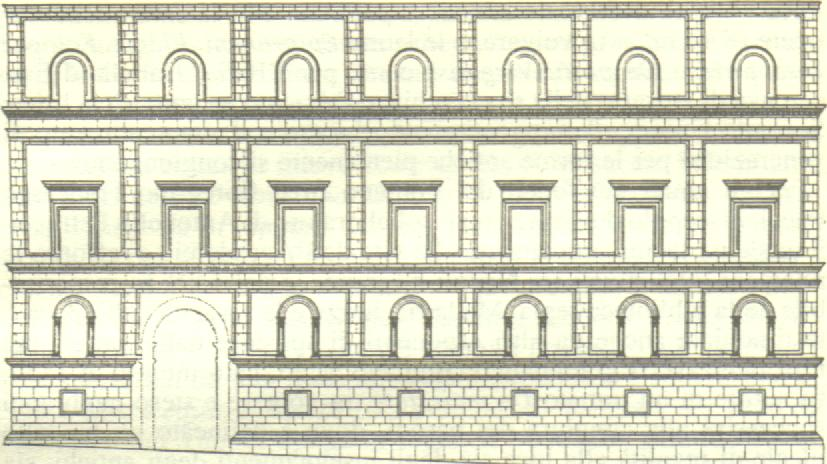
Palazzo del Panormita, at Naples.

The Palazzo del Panormita, in Naples, belonged to him. It was built in the second half of the fifteenth century under the direction of the architect Giovan Filippo de Adinolfo, and sold at the end of the seventeenth century to Giacomo Capece Galeota.

== Palermo ==
A marble plaque on the Via Puglia in Palermo reads:

IN QUESTO

CHE FU ANTICO PALAZZO

DE' BECCADELLI BOLOGNA

NACQUE DI QUELLA STIRPE

ANTONIO DETTO IL PANORMITA

ONORE DI SUA CITTÀ E D'ITALIA

NEL XV SECOLO

In English: "In this (building), which was the ancient palace of the Bologna De'Beccadelli family, was born of that family Antonio, called "the Palermitan" (the one from Palermo), the pride of his city and of Italy, in the 15th century."

== Books ==
- Colangelo, Francesco (1820). Vita di Antonio Beccadelli, soprannominato il Panormita (in Italian). Naples: Angelo Trani.
- Holt Parker (ed.), Antonio Beccadelli, "The Hermaphrodite". (The I Tatti Renaissance Library, 42.) Cambridge, Mass.: Harvard University Press, 2010
