= Lucrezia d'Alagno =

Napoli noblewoman

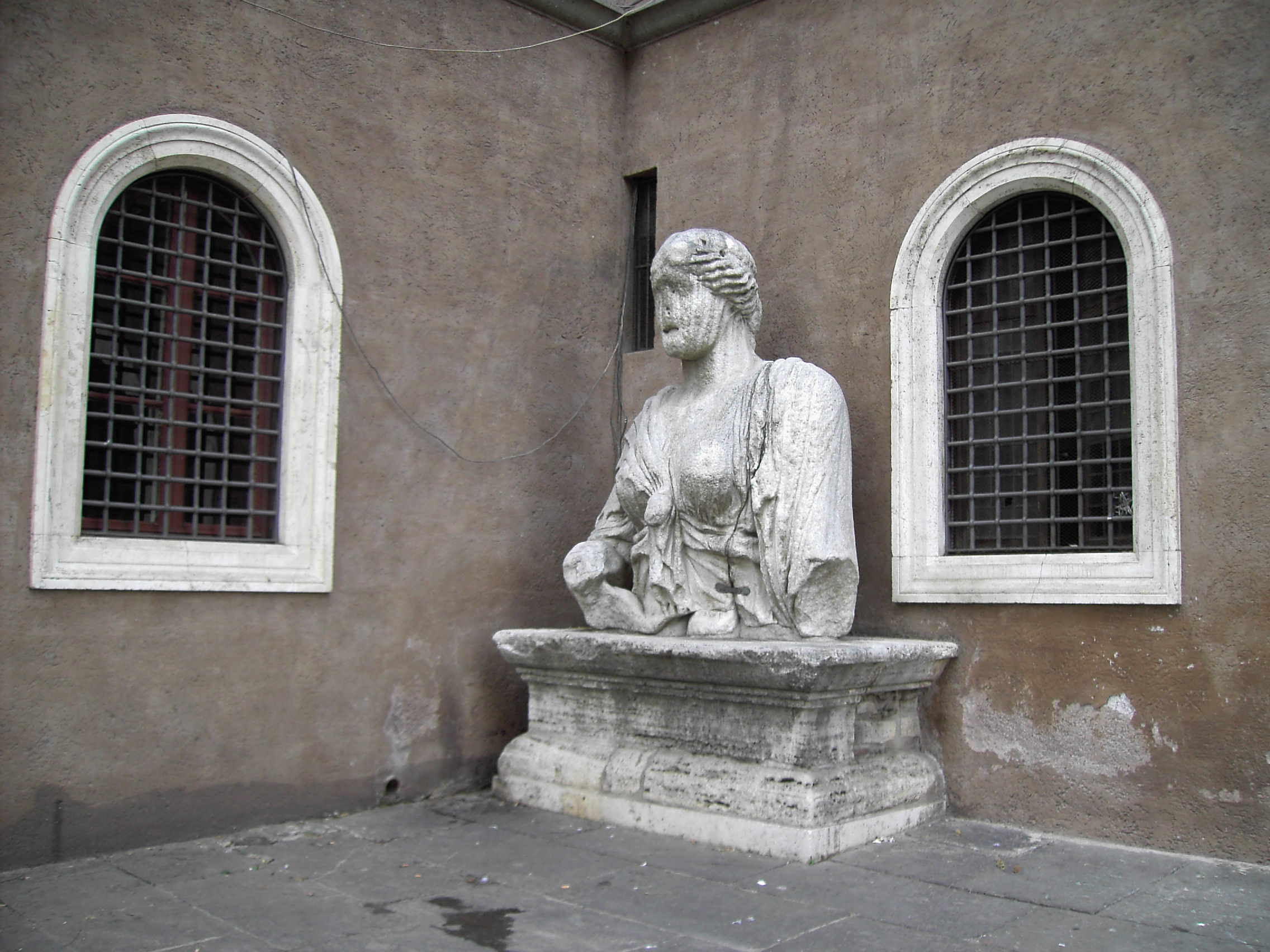
- Born: c. 1430; Naples
- Died: September 23, 1479; Ischia
- Father: Nicholas d'Alagno
- Mother: Covella Toraldo

Lucrezia d'Alagno (c. 1430 – September 23, 1479) was a noblewoman with whom King Alphonso V of Naples had fallen in love.

== Life ==
Lucrezia was daughter of Nicholas d'Alagno and Covella Toraldo. Her father, of Amalfitan origin, was lord of Torre Annunziata.

Alfonso gave Lucrezia and her family lands, titles, and wealth. In 1451, Lucrezia acquired, for example, the Castello del Caiazzo for fifteen thousand ducats through the intercession of Alfonso. In 1442 she received the island of Ischia. Lucrezia in turn entrusted the island's governance to her brother-in-law, Giovanni Torella.

The king also asked for an annulment to his marriage with Maria of Castile, but Pope Callistus III refused it.

Lucrezia nevertheless served as de facto queen at the Neapolitan court as well as an inspiring patron to the circle of scholars and poets who surrounded Alfonso, including Antonio Beccadelli and Giovanni Pontano.

Hopes that Maria would die and make the marriage between Lucrezia and the king possible were dashed when Alfonso himself died in 1458.

She died poor and nearly forgotten in 1479.
