= University of Zaragoza Library =

University library system in Spain

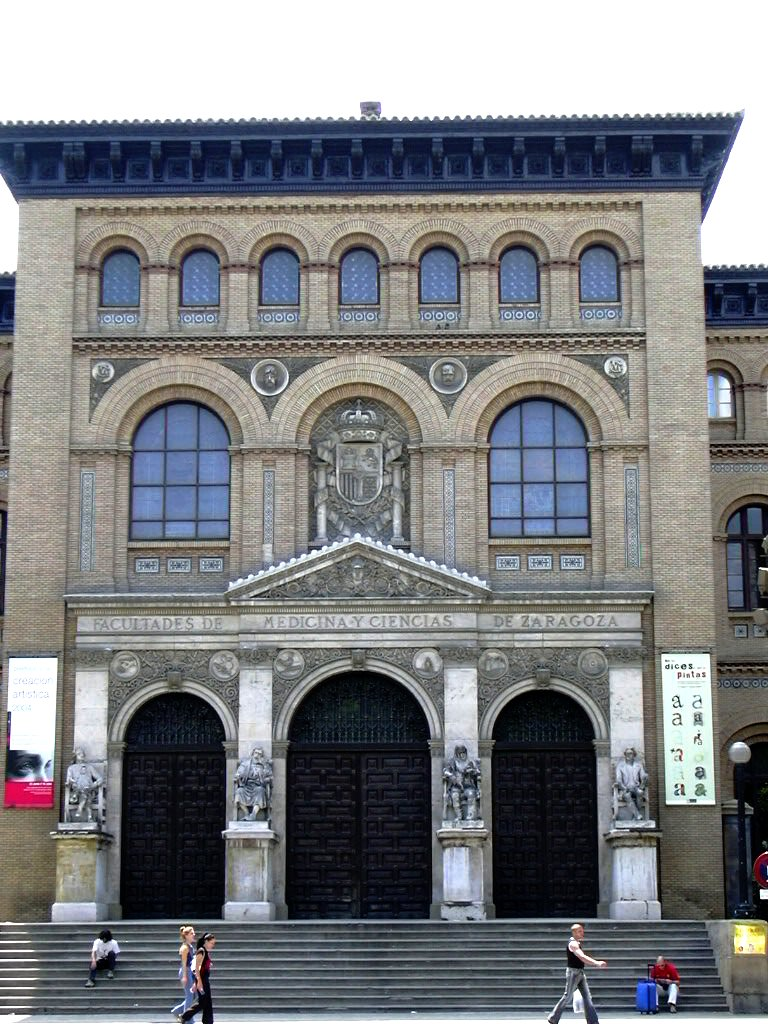
- Paraninfo Building. Main Library
- 41°38′51.5″N 0°53′11.1″W
- Location: Management: Pza. Basilio Paraíso, 4. 50005 Zaragoza; Libraries in Zaragoza; Huesca; Teruel, Spain
- Type: Academic library
- Established: 1796

Other information
- Director: Cristina Seguí Santonja
- Website: biblioteca.unizar.es

The University of Zaragoza Library (BUZ) is the library system of the University of Zaragoza. They are responsible for the management of information resources and the associated activities of learning, instruction, research, and continuing education. Their primary purpose is to work toward the growth, preservation, dissemination, and accessibility of information resources as a participant in the knowledge creation process.

Their structure, function, values, and objectives are defined in their Policies and Services Manual as well as in their Strategic Plan, the most recent being for 2025–2028.

The BUZ is composed of 19 central and campus libraries in addition to the administrative headquarters, and other additional libraries included through agreements with separate institutions.

== History ==
While the official inauguration of the University of Zaragoza Library is marked by its formal opening to the public on November 17, 1796, the efforts behind its creation were a product of the enlightenment and the educational policy of King Carlos III, whose Royal Order of March 14, 1759 ordered the establishment of libraries at all universities in the kingdom.

Unfortunately, all initial development was terminated as a result of the Spanish War of Independence. On August 4, 1809, during the second siege of the city by French troops, the building was destroyed. Reconstruction begins after the war, but the requirement of substantial funding made this process a lengthy one. This began the development of the itinerant nature of the library, which has become part of its identity. The library was without a permanent home for all of the 19th century and much of the 20th century.

The library officially reopened in 1849. Towards the end of the 19th century, the library divided into three sections: the Main/University Library, the Medicine and Science Library, and the Historical Archive. The collections were further subdivided in the beginnings of the 20th century.

During the Spanish Civil War, many traditional library functions were supplanted by the establishment of pro-Franco ideology and cultural repression. Replacement activities included providing troops with books and other materials (Servicio de Lectura al Soldado) and organizing the Commission for the Purification of Libraries in the University of Zaragoza District to remove works banned by the Fascist state. During Franco's regime, the construction of the Ciudad Universitaria (University City) area required the gradual relocation of several departments. The Colleges of Letters and Philosophy, Sciences, Law, and Medicine, and their respective libraries were moved to the new campus. Most of the archives and historical materials were relocated to the Letters and Philosophy building, but part of the collection was still inside the 16th century Cerbuna Chapel when it collapsed on May 6, 1973; the collapse was attributed to structural deterioration and institutional neglect.

Following the approval of the Law of University Reform in 1984, the library began to reestablish itself after the approval of new democratic bylaws. This marked the beginning of a period of change that included a significant increase of staff and the construction of new library buildings for the College of Economics and Business (1996) and the College of Letters and Philosophy/Arts and Letters (2003). The BUZ began a progressive reorganization of its collections that moved away from its traditional fragmented nature, while maintaining the decentralization of individual colleges. The process of catalog automation and the development of the digital library took place from 1995 to the beginning of the 21st century.

In 1984, the year of the university's 400th anniversary, the Main Library was relocated to the newly restored and modified building designed by Ricardo Magdalena (an architect and designer native to Zaragoza) that had been built to house the Colleges of Medicine and Science. In 2011, the Main Library, its associated services, and the European Documentation Center returned to the main hall. The old reading room now serves as an exhibition space for the BUZ collection. This move followed a full restoration of the space that began in 2006.

== Structure ==
The BUZ is a single library system spread through many institutions and managed by the library commission.

== Holdings and collections ==
=== Holdings of the University of Zaragoza Library ===
The University of Zaragoza Library is home to the most important bibliographic holdings in all of Aragon. It contains more than 1 million volumes in different formats and mediums, and provides access to over 20,000 online journals and databases corresponding to areas of study at the university; the online resources are accessible from 24 access points in academic buildings on campus. Through Roble, the online catalog, users can discover what is available in the library and sign up to receive updates on newly acquired titles. Since 2013, the search tool Alcorze has allowed users to search the library's catalog, digital repository, and subscription databases simultaneously.

=== Preservation ===
As a part of its dedication to the preservation of knowledge, the University maintains collections containing materials of significant intrinsic or historical value. The majority of this collection is located in the Main library. Because of their uniqueness, these materials are kept in a special collections unit with additional restrictions. Many of these materials are accessible through the University of Zaragoza Digital Archives.

The highlights of the collection include 416 manuscripts dated from the 15th-19th century, 406 incunables, and an important collection of printed works from the 16th-18th century. Additionally, there is a broad spectrum of publications from research-oriented and cultural institutions throughout Aragon.

The BIVIDA project (Digital Library of Aragonian Law) provides digitized copies of many of the works on Aragonian law held by the University of Zaragoza Library.

== Services ==
The library provides several different services, including use of its collections, spaces for academic instruction, studying, and research, outreach, reference services, and instruction.

=== Collection access ===
- Browsing and in-library use
- Borrowing: In addition to borrowing materials in person, users can access renewals, holds, borrowing history, etc. through their online account.
- Access to electronic resources and online services

=== Spaces and equipment for academic instruction, studying, and research ===
- Access to spaces and equipment including classrooms, Wi-Fi, study rooms, copy services, and public access computers

=== Communications ===
The BUZ uses the following methods to share relevant information with users about the library itself, the services provided, resources, and activities. These methods also serve to direct user opinions and suggestions.

- News: the library uses its webpage to share the latest updates about schedules, lectures, seminars, etc., as well as to provide professional information for librarians. The library's blog, Tirabuzón, is used for communicating and interacting with the university community and anyone interested in what is new and notable in the library world.
- Exhibitions: The library shares its historical collections through exhibitions in the historic reading room at the main library and at other branch libraries.
- Web 2.0: The University of Zaragoza Library has created a social media presence in order to better connect with its user base; a Facebook page, a X account, a Pinterest board, accounts on Slideshare, Flickr and Instagram and a YouTube channel.

=== Collection management ===
- Course reserves for various degree programs
- Research guides to the library's collection and research support services.

=== Access ===
- Interlibrary loan and photocopying requests

=== Reference services ===
- Both general and specialized reference services are available in person, by phone, and electronically.

=== Bibliographic instruction ===
- General instruction, specialized instruction on request
- Information literacy

== Open access at the University of Zaragoza ==
Since 2008, the University of Zaragoza Library has been an active proponent of open access policies through the Zaguán digital repository. Zaguán provides access to a broad range of digitized documents from the library's archives including scholarly articles, books, dissertations, reports, preprints, and personal archives bequeathed or donated to the library, like those of the poet Miguel Labordeta.

== Awards and distinctions ==
In 2011, the library earned the EFQM (European Foundation for Quality Management) Excellence Award 400+ rating for its management system based on the criteria of the EFQM Excellence Model. This rating was renewed in 2013, 2015, 2018 and in 2023 the library earned the EFQM 500. Additionally, the Development Institute of Aragon recognized the library with the Club Empresa 400 rating in 2012, and the Award for Excellence in Business in 2013.
