= Jan Dullaert =

Flemish philosopher and logician

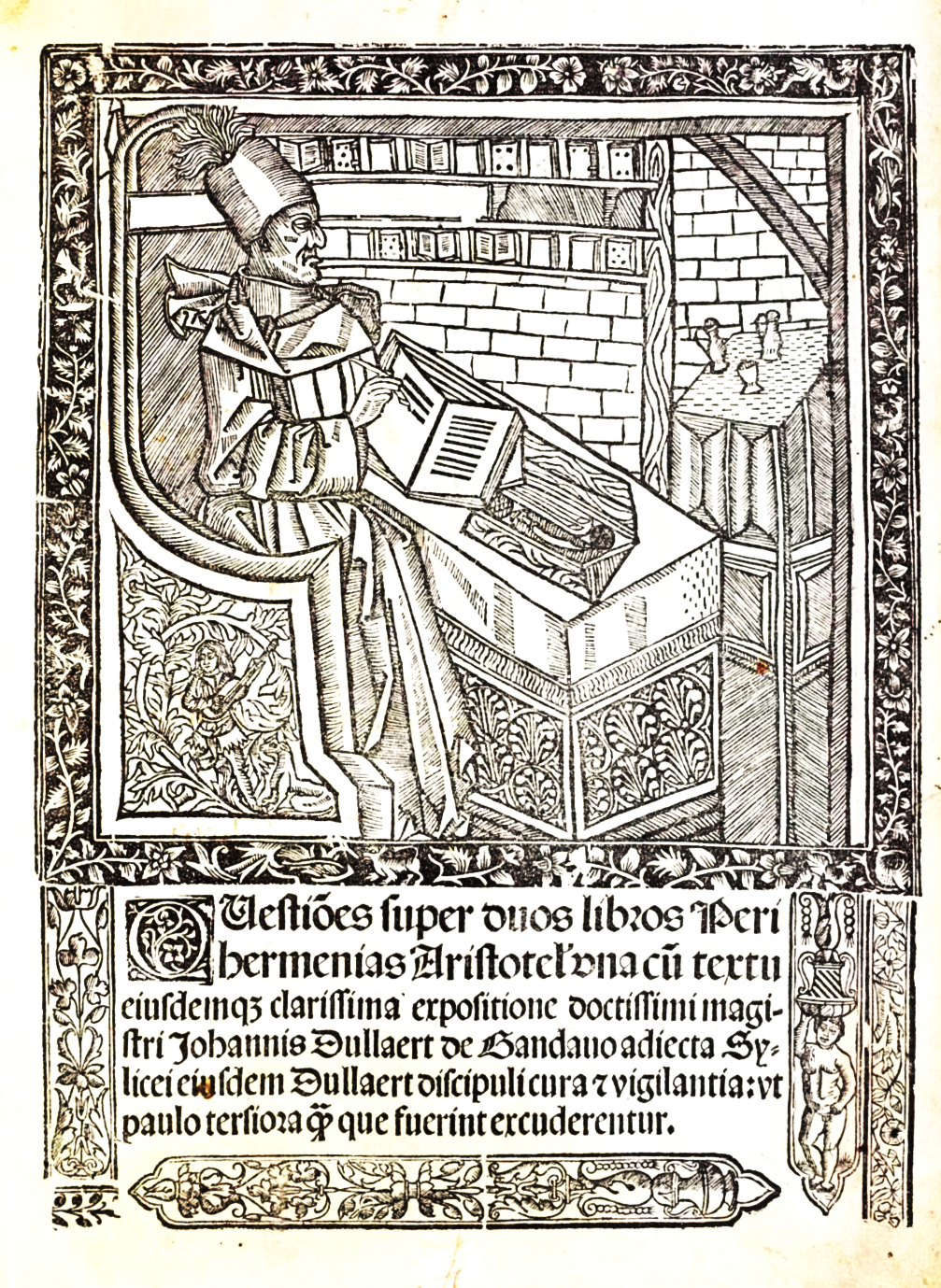
Quaestiones super octo libros phisicorum Aristotelis necnon super libros de celo et mundo, edition published in Salamanca in 1517

Jan Dullaert of Ghent Latinized as Ioannis Dullardi (c. 1480 – 19 September 1513) was a Flemish philosopher and logician who lived in France as an Augustinian friar. He elucidated principles of propositional logic in his commentaries on the works of Aristotle published from 1506 to 1509.

Dullaert was born in Ghent and moved to Paris at the age of fourteen to study and became a student of John Mair (or John Major 1470–1550) at the Collège de Montaigu. In 1509 he shifted to the Collège de Beauvais. He received a baccalaureus formatus in theology from the Collège de la Sorbonne and he became a teacher, influencing many scholars of the period including Gaspar Lax, Juan de Celaya and Juan Luis Vives. Dullaert is known from about ten books that he contributed to. His student Vives wrote a biography in 1514. Dullaert held a realist view and opposed the nominalist ideas of the period.

His works including those edited by others:

- Quaestiones super octo libros phisicorum Aristotelis necnon super libros de celo et mundo (1506)
- Subtilissime questiones super octo physicorum libros Aristotelis (1509, comments on J. Buridanus)
- Questiones super duos libros peri hermenias Aristotelis una cum ipsius textu eiusque clarissima expositione (1509 edited by Juan Martinez Siliceo)
- Librorum Meteororum [Aristotelis] facilis expositio (1512)
- Pauli Veneti philosophi clarissimi liber maximus de compositione mundi (1512)
- Notes on Hyginus' Astronomica (1512)
- Tractatus Terminorum (1521, edited posthumously, perhaps by Johannes Drabbe Bonicollius)
- Questiones in librum Predicabilium Porphirii (1521)
- Questiones in librum praedicamentorum Aristotelis (c. 1523)
