= Sara Giménez Giménez =

Spanish lawyer and gypsy activist (born 1977)

Sara Gimenez Gimenez
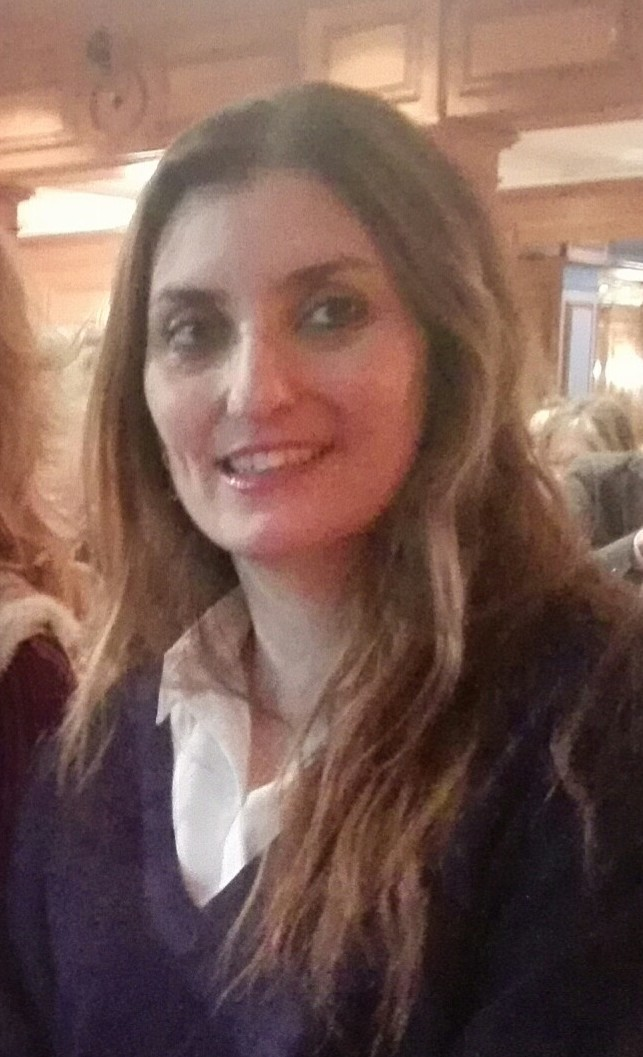
- (2018)
- Born: 19 January 1977 (age 49); Huesca, Spain
- Other name: Sara Gimenez
- Education: University of Zaragoza; University of the Basque Country
- Occupation: Lawyer
- Organization: European Commission against Racism and Intolerance
- Political party: Citizens
- Movement: Integration of the gitano community into society
- Board member of: President, Fundación Secretariado Gitano

Sara Giménez Giménez (born, Huesca, 19 January 1977) is a Spanish Roma lawyer who stands out for her fight for the integration of the gitano community into society. She also fights against the inequalities suffered by minorities based on race or sexual orientation. She became a member of the European Commission against Racism and Intolerance in 2018 and joined the board of Fundación Secretariado Gitano (FSG) the following year.

== Education ==
"I studied Law because it was very clear to me the need to work for the real equality of my people, especially, Roma women." (Sara Giménez, 12 January 2018)

Giménez studied law at the University of Zaragoza and completed her studies with a Postgraduate Degree in human rights at the University of the Basque Country. She has also been trained in Direction and Management of NGOs and has specialized studies on minors, immigration, and criminal law, among other specialties.

== Career ==
As head of the Department of Equality and the Fight against Discrimination of the FSG, she carried out direct legal support in the defense of cases of discrimination before the courts and directed the annual report Discriminación y comunidad gitana (Discrimination and the Roma community). Some of the most notable cases were that of a Romanian gypsy from Barcelona (ruled in favor at the Provincial Court of Barcelona in December 2013), and the case of the gypsy widow Maria Luisa Muñoz “La Nena”, also favorable, at the European Court of Human Rights in December 2009.

On 21 March 2018 she began her work as a member of the European Commission against Racism and Intolerance (ECRI) in which she carries out control and reviews work on laws, policies, and measures on racism and other forms of intolerance. With her appointment, it is the first time that a Roma lawyer represents Spain on this committee.

On 13 March 2019 she entered Spanish politics in the Citizens political party, confirming her candidacy for the Congress of Deputies, number three by the Citizens party in the community of Madrid.

Since June 2021, she has been the president of the FSG, after joining the Board of Trustees as vice-resident in 2019.
