= Chronique romane =

The Chronique romane ("romance chronicle") or Chronicle of Montpellier (French: Chronique de Montpellier) is an Old Occitan and Middle French chronicle of the city of Montpellier. The Chronique was probably made for the use of town officials, who would have wanted a record of local history for help in administration and in forging civic pride. The recording of town officials, such as council members, was also important, and in two manuscripts the Chronique is found along with the Charte de 1204, a compilation of local customary law. Its annalistic format was typical of civic chronicles of the same period.

== Manuscripts ==
The Chronique survived in five manuscripts at one point. The annals of Montpellier H119, now among the fonds anciens (ancient sources) in the Bibliothèque de la faculté de médecine at Montpellier, cover the entire period 816–1364. The lost manuscript called Joubert, formerly of the Bibliothèque Royale at Paris, contained only the annals for 1088–1264. The Thalamus des archives du roi is now also lost, leaving Le grand Thalamus de Montpellier and Le petit Thalamus de Montpellier, which is kept in the municipal archives of Montpellier and covers the years 814–1604. All the manuscripts derive from a single source for they years they have in common. In general Le petit Thalamus has the most complete entries, though both it and Montpellier H119 were composed "negligently and hastily, with frequent orthographic and historical errors" and differ in the dating of many events.

Orthographic evidence indicates that the manuscript Montpellier H119 is older than Le petit Thalamus. For example, the former spelling "Montpeslier" (from Latin Montepestalario) is preferred in the former where "Montpellier" occurs in the latter. The final year in H119 is 1364, whereas Le petit Thalamus continues 340 years to 1604. Earlier copies of the chronicle also contained annual lists of town councillors in the same manuscript, but in the late Petit Thalamus these lists are found in the margin beside their years of the chronicle. The penultimate entry of the H119 chronicle is for 1295, probably the date of its initial completion, since all entries up to that point are written in a thirteenth-century Gothic script. The possessor of the manuscript in 1364 probably added the final, more cursive, entry himself. Le petit Thalamus contains many years from between 1295 and 1364, but not 1364 itself.

== Modern editions ==
In the sixteenth century one President Philippy, a local official, made a critical edition of the text of the Thalamus des archives du roi, but this went unpublished. On the eve of the French Revolution, a Father Pacotte of Saint-Germain-des-Prés also tried to edit the chronicle, but it too went unpublished. The Archaeological Society of Montpellier published the first edition of the chronicle, based on Le petit Thalamus, in 1836. In 2006 a critical edition with English translation based on Montpellier H119 was published by Jeffrey S. Widmayer.

== Date and authorship ==
The editors of Le petit Thalamus speculated that the original chronicle, from which all the manuscript versions derive, was begun around 1088, during the reign of William V of Montpellier, and continued by a succession of scribes. The selection of this date is probably due to its being the starting point of the chronicle in the Joubert manuscript, which is the oldest one. However, in evoking the memory of Raymond IV of Toulouse (1093–1105), the original scribe erroneously puts him in power at the time of the death of Charlemagne (814), an unlikely mistake for a contemporary of Raymond's to make. There is no reason the composition could not have begun later.

The earliest date of the chronicle is 814, the year of Charlemagne's death, incorrectly thought by the scribe to be 809 years after the birth of Christ. The years between 814 and 1134 are only infrequently recorded, and they year 1104 is out of order, but from 1141 the chronicle records multiple entries per year and includes more detail. This may indicate the beginning of the composition. The original scribe may have relied on "vague historical memory" and the collective memory of a city that lived for centuries under the rule of one family, the Guilhems, to record events prior to his own day.

The authors of the chronicle took an especial interest in miracles and the foundation of religious organisations, but it was unusual for clerics of the time to write in the vernacular, unless they were writing for patrons illiterate in Latin.

== Editions ==
- Thalamus parvus: le petit thalamus de Montpellier, publié pour la première fois d'après les manuscrits originaux. Ferdinand Pégat, Eugène Thomas, et al., edd. Société archéologique de Montpellier. Jean Martel Aîné, 1836/40.
  - At Internet Archive
  - At GoogleBooks
