= Nikos E. Politis =

Greek journalist (??–2005)

Nikos E. Politis Νίκος Ε. Πολίτης
- Born: Patras, Greece
- Died: 2005; Patras, Greece
- Occupations: writer, historian of Patras

Nikos Politis (Νίκος Ε. Πολίτης, died 2005) was a Greek writer, journalist, and historian of Patras and sports.

He wrote many books, all of them about Patras and its history. He is one of the greatest historians in Patras together with Stefanos Thomopoulos.

== Filmography ==
=== Film ===
Year	Book	Transliteration and translation	Publisher and ISBN
1984	Patras Press Chronicles	Χρονικό του Πατραϊκού τύπου Chroniko tou Patraikou typou	-
1987	The Patras Carnival	Το Καρναβάλι της Πάτρας; To Karnavali tis Patras	Achaikes publishers
1994	Patrean Sports, Volume I, The First Decare 1891-1900	Ο Πατραϊκός αθλητισμός, τόμος Α΄, Η πρώτη δεκαετία 1891-1900; O Patraikos athlitisos, Tomos I, I proti dekaetia 1891-1900	Achaikes Publishers; ISBN 960-7164-91-1
1996	The Olympic Games in 1896, As Greeks and Foreigners Lived	Οι Ολυμπιακοί αγώνες του 1896, όπως τούς έζησαν Έλληνες και ξένοι I Olymbiaki abones tou 1896, opos tous ezisan Ellines ke xeni	Achaikes publishers
1997	Patrean Sports, Volume II, From the Tofalou period until the founding of Panachaiki	Ο Πατραϊκός αθλητισμός, τόμος Β΄, απο την εποχή του Τόφαλου ως την ίδρυση της Παναχαϊκής -apo tin epochi tou Tofalou os tin idryssi tis Panachaikis	Achaikes publishers ISBN 960-7164-92-X
1997	The First Photos in Patras (1860–1900)	I protoi fotografoi tis Patras (1860-1900)	Achaikes Publishers; ISBN 960-7164-68-7
1999	The Lazy Times of Patras, Doros and the People's Press	Oi oraioi treloi tis Patras, Doros kai laikoi typoi	Achaikes Publishers; ISBN 978-960-7960-33-7
2001	Ilias A. Synodinos (Momos Patrefs)	-	Peri Technon, Patras; ISBN 960-8411-12-2
2003	Patrinologinata; Volume I: Patras and the Old Patrean Era; Volume II: Famous and Sourced Information That Occurred in Patras; Volume II: The Everyday Life in Patras That Changed. Patrean and its Emancipation	Πατρινολογήματα τόμος Α΄, η Πάτρα και οι Πατρινοί παλαιοτέρων εποχώ Τόμος Β΄, άγνωστα η ελάχιστα γνωστά γεγονότα που συνέβησαν στην Πάτρα; Ο καθημερινός βίος στην Πάτρα άλλοτε. Οι πατρινές και η χειραφέτησή τους Tomos I, i Patra kai o Patrinoi palaioteron epochon Tomos II, agnosta i elachists gnosta gegonota pou synevisan stin Patra; Tomos III, O kathimerinos vios stin Patra allote. Oi patrines kai i cheirafetisi tous	Peri Technon; Volume I:ISBN 960-8260-38-8; Volume II: ISBN 960-8260-38-8 :Volume III: ISBN 960-8260-63-9

== Sources and references ==
- The Beautiful Stupid People in Old Patras, Doros and the People's Press, Nikos Politis, Achaikes Publishers, Patras, 1999, ISBN 978-960-7960-33-7
