= Jacopo da Forlì =

Italian physician and philosopher (1364–1414)

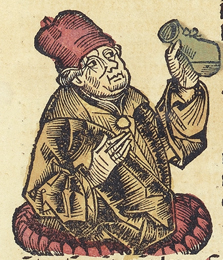
- Wood cut of Jacobus de Forlivio from the Nuremberg Chronicle
- Born: c. 1364; Forlì, Papal States (now Forlì, Italy)
- Died: 12 February 1414 (aged 49–50); Padua, Republic of Venice (now Padua, Italy)
- Scientific career
- Fields: Medicine
- Institutions: University of Padua
- Doctoral students: Vittorino da Feltre

Jacopo da Forlì (also known as Giacomo dalla Torre, Jacopo della Torre, Iacobus Foroliviensis, or Giacomo da Forli; c. 1364 – 12 February 1414) was a 14th-century Italian physician and philosopher.

== Life ==
Jacopo is known particularly for his studies of embryology. He became a professor at the University of Padua in the early 15th century, where he taught Vittorino da Feltre. His death is documented in the Malatestiana Library (in Latin):

Explicit questio de intensione et remissione formarum secundum famosissimum artium et medicine doctorem magistrum Jacobum de Forlivio qui 1414 pridie ydus februarii ab hac vita ad superiora migravit. Scripta vero per me fratrem Bellinum de Padua 1468.

It describes that Jacopo died on 12 February 1414.
