= Vasilis Politis =

Greek philosopher

- Born: May 20, 1963 (age 63); Athens, Greece

Education
- Education: Oxford University
- Thesis: Pure altruism : its possibility and value (1994)

Philosophical work
- Era: 21st-century philosophy
- Region: Western philosophy
- School: Ancient philosophy
- Institutions: Trinity College Dublin
- Main interests: Ancient Greek Philosophy, Neokantianism

Vasilis Politis (born May 20, 1963) is a Greek philosopher and associate professor of Philosophy at Trinity College Dublin. He is known for his expertise on Plato and Aristotle. Politis is a Fellow of the Wissenschaftskolleg zu Berlin (2009–10) and Trinity College Dublin (2005) and director of the Dublin Centre for the Study of the Platonic Tradition.

== Books ==
- Plato's Essentialism. 2021. doi:10.1017/9781108986243. ISBN 978-1-108-98624-3.
- The Structure of Enquiry in Plato's Early Dialogues. 2015. doi:10.1017/CBO9781107705746. ISBN 978-1-107-70574-6.
- Routledge Philosophy GuideBook to Aristotle and the Metaphysics. 2004. doi:10.4324/9780203647424. ISBN 978-1-134-52980-3.

=== Edited ===
- The Aporetic Tradition in Ancient Philosophy, co-edited with George Karamanolis, CUP 2016
- Kant’s Critique of Pure Reason, Everyman 1993
