= University of Zaragoza =

University in Zaragoza, Spain

- Universidad de Zaragoza
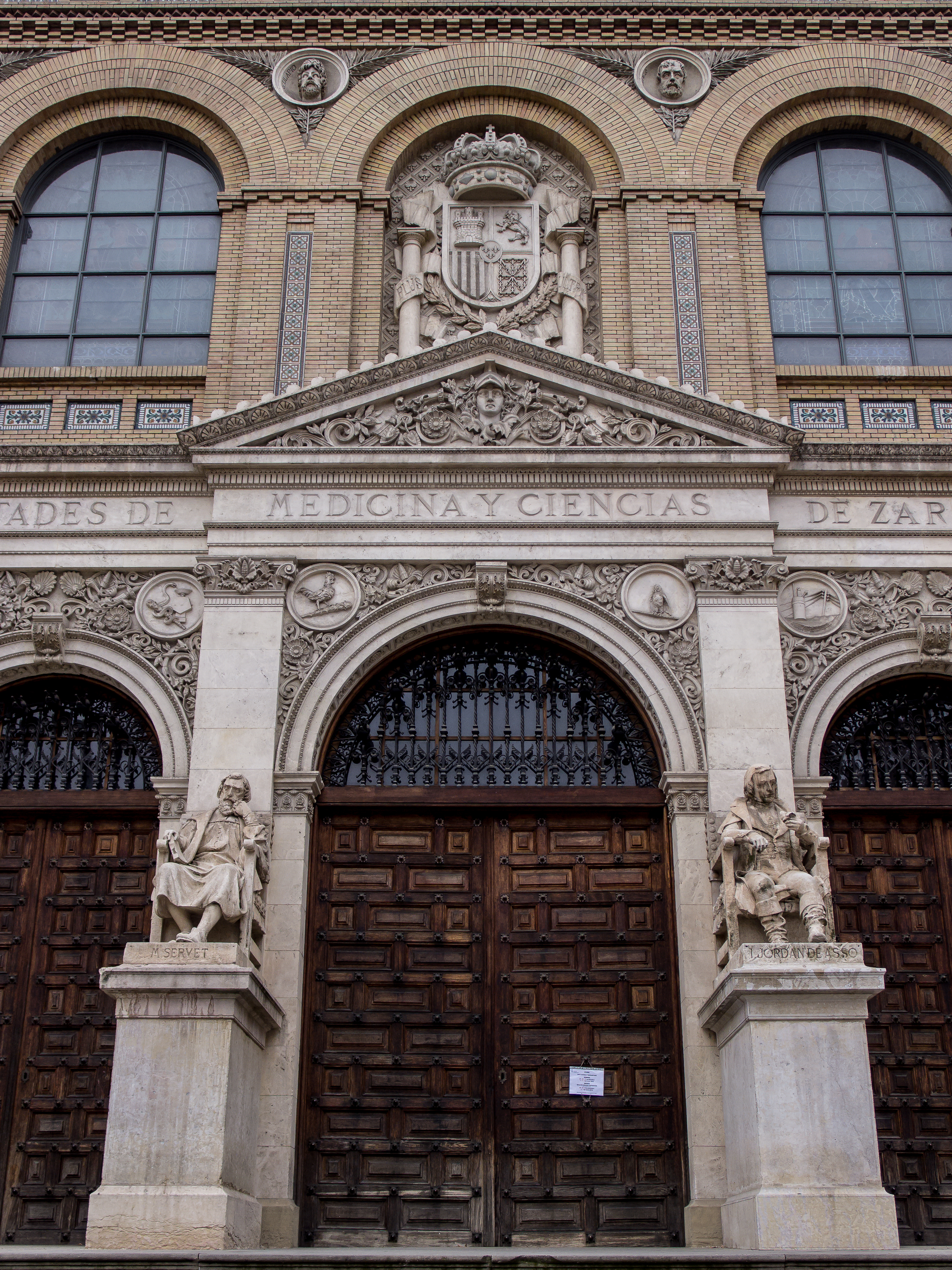
- Type: Public university
- Established: As the School of Zaragoza (7th century); University of Zaragoza in 1542; 484 years ago
- Rector: Rosa María Bolea Bailo
- Academic staff: 3,911 (2013–2014)
- Administrative staff: 1,806 (2013–2014)
- Students: 36,492 including self-study and international participants (2013–2014)
- Undergraduates: 30,415 (2013–2014)
- Postgraduates: 3,528 (2013–2014)
- Location: Zaragoza, Aragon, Spain; 41°38′33″N 0°54′00″W
- Campus: Jaca, Huesca, La Almunia de Doña Godina, Zaragoza, Teruel
- Website: www.unizar.es/information-institution/university-information
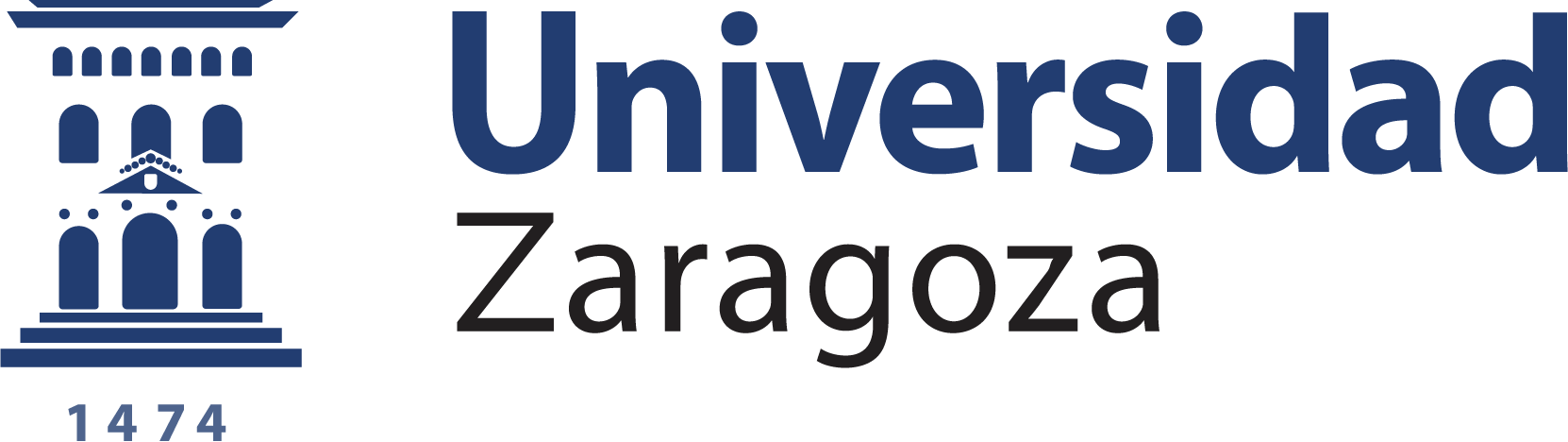

The University of Zaragoza, sometimes referred to as Saragossa University (Spanish: Universidad de Zaragoza, UNIZAR) is a public university with teaching campuses and research centres spread over the three provinces of Aragon (Spain).

Founded in 1542, it is one of the oldest universities in Spain, with a history dating back to the Roman period.

It is the alma mater of Prime Ministers Pascual Madoz, Manuel Azaña, Salustiano de Olózaga and Eusebio Bardají, of the Nobel Prize laureate and father of modern neuroscience Santiago Ramón y Cajal, the Catholic saint Josemaría Escrivá and the Cuban national hero Jose Marti, who studied at this university.

In 2014, it had more than 30,000 students and more than 3,000 teaching members, among its 22 centers and 74 degrees. Its current rector is José Antonio Mayoral Murillo, full professor of organic chemistry.

== History ==
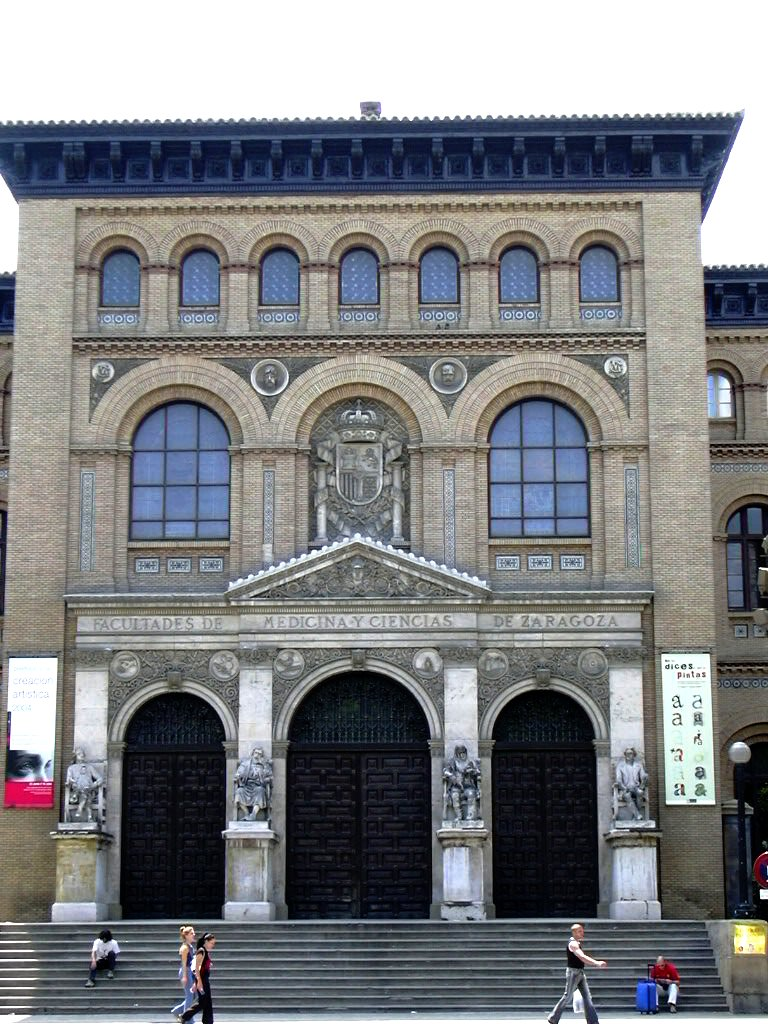
The building of the Former Faculty of Medicine and Sciences in Zaragoza, now called Paraninfo.

=== Beginnings ===
Ecclesiastical schools were the initial elements of the University of Zaragoza. These schools were later consolidated into the School of Zaragoza, led by Bishop Braulio during the seventh century (who would later be made the patron saint of the university). The School of Arts officially became a university in 1542, though some scholars argue it could be considered a university of arts since 1477.

=== Foundation ===
The studium generale of arts, also called studio mayor or primitive University of Zaragoza, was in the Magdalena and St. Nicholas neighborhoods. Its main building was a broad tower of circular base on the old wall of the city, and it had more than 20 chambers distributed in three different floors. Besides the normal chambers that were granted and rented by the university to both pupils and teachers, on the first floor the tower had the chamber called general mayor, where the grades were given, and also a library. On the second floor were the prison, the latrines and the doorkeeper's chamber. Finally, on the last floor there were bigger rooms with balconies, and the chamber of the four Masters of Arts. The studium had also bought more chambers in the tower surroundings and on the city wall; the most important were the five chambers called El Cocinador, and eleven more in the studium's square, called El Corralet chambers.

The studium's head was the chancellor, a position always held by the archbishop of Zaragoza, and the second in command was the vice-chancellor, who was also the high master of the studium. The high master collected taxes from any pupil, with the exception of the poor, the cleric from La Seo cathedral, or any student he would want to forgive such payment. Under him were the four masters of arts, four positions reserved for selected individuals who held a master of arts degree, and who were in charge of teaching liberal arts. Under them there were the bachilleres, who mostly taught advanced Latin grammar, and the camareros, who provided more basic Latin lessons. The lowest-ranking teachers were the cubicularios, also called repetidores in other studiums, who merely repeated the lessons from the other teachers. The studium also had a rector, who was an apostolic position that represented the archbishop's power in this primitive university, and had the power of approving all the academic positions in the studium, and administrated the fees from the students for reparations and other needs of the university.

The primitive University of Zaragoza had a Faculty of Aristotelian Logic and another of philosophy (it included both natural philosophy and Aristotelian ethics), and all together they formed the Faculty of Arts. But this studium generale also had a Faculty of Grammar, which had several hundred students during the early 16th century, while the Faculty of Arts had near 50. In order to get their grades, the students had to be endorsed by another older student or teacher, pass private exams, and pay fees. Lessons were taught in the mornings and afternoons, which meant that many of them would rent chambers to stay in at night.

This primitive University of Zaragoza had physician master Pedro La Cabra as its first high master, and after him the maestre Luis Gorriz, who died in 1510. After him, the archbishop appointed his personal physician, master Juan Tarabal, who remained in this position until 1520, when the archbishop died because of the plague. That year Tarabal was substituted by master Gaspar Lax, a prolific author and prominent European figure in logic, philosophy and mathematics, whose works were used in many other contemporaneous universities. Lax had been teaching in the University of Paris and later in the university of Huesca, and from 1520 he was simultaneously high master and one of the four masters of arts. This high master had Erasmian friends, both in Paris and Zaragoza, and allowed Erasmus's works to be taught in this studium. The same year, 1520, Michael Servetus – the brilliant nephew of Gaspar Lax – started his studies under the direction of his uncle and the other three masters of arts (Exerich, Ansías, Miranda, Carnicer, Villalpando). Servetus became himself a Master of Arts in 1525, a position he held until 1527, when he had a brawl with his uncle Gaspar Lax, and after being expelled from the studium he left Spain for Toulouse Studium Generale. Lax remained the high master until his death in 1560.

=== Recent history ===
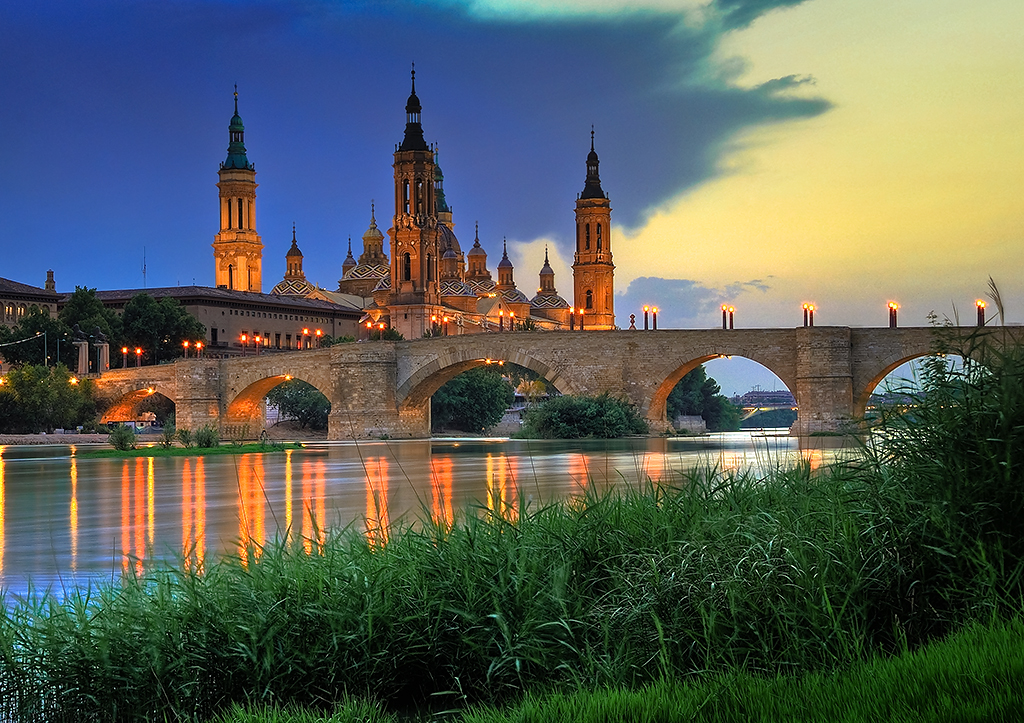
Basílica del Pilar and river Ebro.

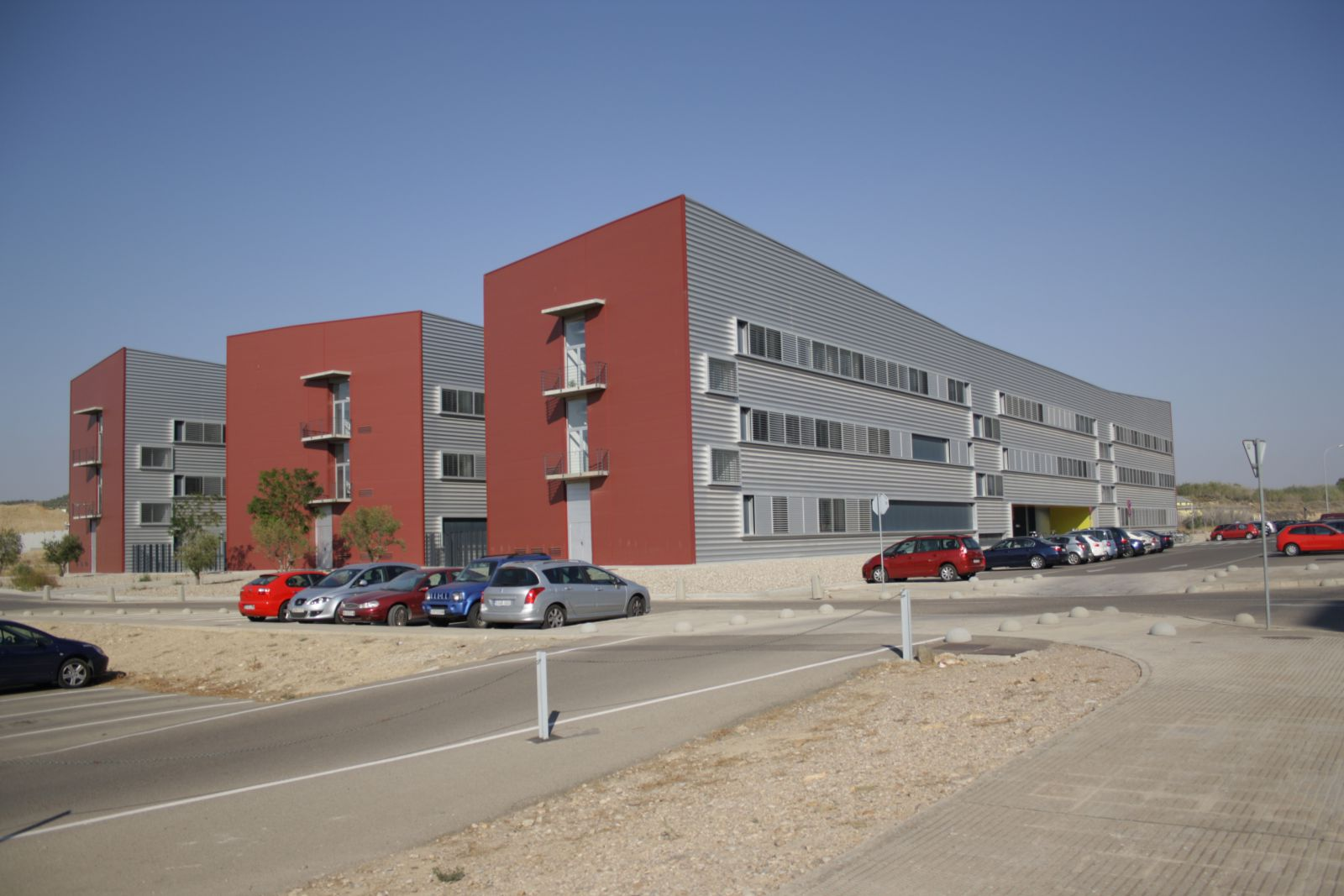
Buildings of the Institute for Biocomputation and Physics of Complex Systems in Zaragoza, Spain.

The university, with a total of about 40,000 students, has a teaching staff of about 3,000 in different positions and an administrative and technical staff of about 2,000. It is distributed across campuses located in Zaragoza, Huesca and Teruel.

== Campus ==
The University of Zaragoza campuses are located in the autonomous Community of Aragon in Spain. The community is made up of three provinces: Zaragoza, Huesca, and Teruel. The original campus resides in Zaragoza, the capital of Aragon, but additional campuses were created in both Huesca and Teruel in 1985.

=== Zaragoza ===
The Zaragoza campus is divided into five different locations throughout the city. Campus Plaza San Francisco is the largest of the five locations and is home to a majority of the university colleges and departments in Zaragoza. The other four locations, Campus Rio Ebro, Escuela Universitaria de Turismo, Plaza de Basilio and Facultad de Veterinaria host only one to two colleges each.

The Paraninfo building, located on the San Francisco campus, is one of the most valuable and significant buildings owned by the entire university. Originally inaugurated in 1893, the building was scheduled for restoration in 2006. The project inauguration was attended by the King of Spain, the president of the Government of Aragon and other important figures. The restoration architects, Luis Franco and Mariano Pemán, made great efforts to maintain the architectural heritage of the building while adding new functionality. At the front of the building sit four large stone statues of notable scientists and doctors with connections to the university. On display are Andrés Piquer, Miguel Servet, Ignacio Jordán de Asso and Fausto Elhuyar. Today, the Paraninfo is, as the name suggests, a functional auditorium as well as the University of Zaragoza Library (main library).

=== Huesca ===
Huesca is located roughly 75 kilometers (47 mi) northeast of Zaragoza. The Huesca location has a number of colleges including the Polytechnic School, Faculty of Health and Sport Science, Faculty of Humanities and Education, and Faculty of Business and Public Management. Also, the affiliated School of Nursing of San Jorge hospital is located in Huesca.

=== Teruel ===
Teruel is located roughly 170 kilometers (110 mi) south of Zaragoza. The Teruel campus is home to the technical college where computer engineering and similar programs are located. It is also the location of the Faculty of Social and Human Sciences and the affiliated School of Nursing of the Obispo Polanco hospital.

== Academics ==
At the University of Zaragoza, the old traditional studies are offered at faculties (facultades), e.g. Facultad de Derecho (Faculty of Law), while newer, more technical studies are offered at schools (escuelas) e.g. Escuela Universitaria de Ingeniería Técnica ('University School for Technical Engineering') or polytechnics (politécnicos), e.g. Centro Politécnico Superior ('Higher Polytechnic Centre').

=== Spanish as a foreign language ===
Courses in Spanish as a foreign language are run throughout the year and vary between 90 and 570 hours. The university offers all levels and some specialised courses. Courses along the academic term are offered in Zaragoza, while the summer courses are offered in Jaca – the Pyrenees. The University of Zaragoza was the first Spanish university to offer Spanish courses for international students in 1927.

=== Research centers ===
The University of Zaragoza covers a wide spectrum of knowledge organized within the areas of engineering and technology, experimental sciences, health sciences, social and juridical sciences and humanities. In 2010, the University of Zaragoza had six research institutes, one affiliated research institute, five joint research institutes and three research centers. At this time, the annual figure allocated by the University of Zaragoza to research and development was €60 million. By 2011, the university had an estimated 3,803 researchers and 8,305 partnering companies.

==== Immunotherapy cancer research in Aragon ====
The University of Zaragoza is one of the world leaders in immunotherapy cancer research. A large amount of this research is led by the individual teams of Julián Pardo, Luis Martinez and Alberto Anel. Their research has led to significant contributions in the understanding of cancer cell immunity and they have numerous patents intended for cancer treatments.

=== MIT–Zaragoza International Logistics Program ===
The MIT–Zaragoza International Logistics Program is a collaboration between the Massachusetts Institute of Technology's Center for Transportation and Logistics (CTL) and the University of Zaragoza. It was established in 2003 together with the PLAZA logistics park, the Government of Aragon and industry partners from the private and non-profit sectors..

The education program offers a master's degree which builds upon the curriculum of MIT's master of engineering in supply chain management (SCM). The program is taught in English and attracts an international audience, with 11 countries of origin represented in the class of 20 students for the 2014 academic year. The program has been named by El Mundo the #1 logistics and supply chain management degree in Spain for the last four years from 2011 to 2015. In addition, the collaboration offers a doctorate degree and executive education courses leading to certificates in various logistics-related disciplines. The research program uses the logistics park as a testing ground, in collaboration with academic institutions and companies.

=== Rankings ===
University rankings

Global – Overall
- ARWU World: 601–700 (2023)
- QS World: =523 (2024)
- THE World: 801–1000 (2024)
- USNWR Global: =676 (2023)

El Mundo rankings of Spanish master programs
(2014–2015)

- #1 Logistics and supply chain management
- #2 Environmental energy

(2013–2014)

- #1 Education
- #1 Logistics and supply chain management
- #2 Environmental energy

Academic Ranking of World Universities (ARWU)
(2013)

  1. 9–10 top universities in Spain

CWTS Leiden Ranking (Spain)
Impact – measured by citations
Collaboration – measured by co-authorships
(2014)

- #3 Social sciences (impact)
- #3 Medical sciences (collaboration)
- #3 Cognitive sciences (collaboration)
- #14 All sciences (impact)
- #14 All sciences (collaboration)

== See also ==
- List of medieval universities
- List of University of Zaragoza people
