= Bassano Politi =

Italian mathematician

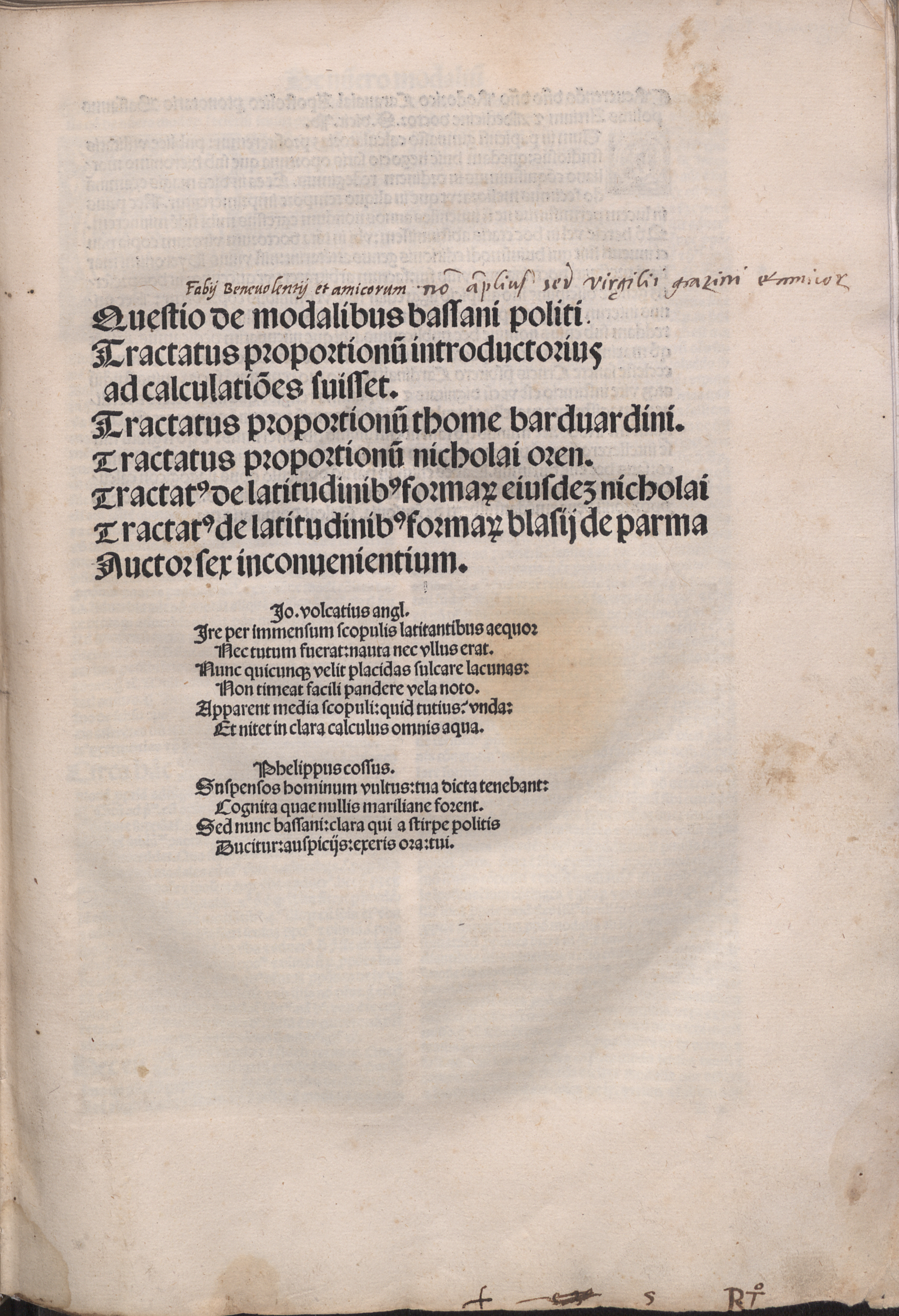
Questio de modalibus, title page

Bassano Politi was a 16th-century Italian mathematician.

He published Questio de modalibus, a book where he collected several medieval treatises by Thomas Bradwardine, Nicole Oresme, Biagio Pelacani, and Giovanni de Casali.

== Works ==
- Questio de modalibus (in Latin). Venice: Ottaviano Scoto, Boneto Locatello. 1505.
