= Gaspar Lax =

Spanish mathematician, logician and philosopher (1487–1560)

Gaspar Lax (1487 – 23 February 1560) was a Spanish mathematician, logician, and philosopher who spent much of his career in Paris.

== Biography ==
Lax was born in Sariñena, the son of Leonor de la Cueva and Gaspar Lax, a physician, and had two brothers and four sisters. He studied the Seven Liberal Arts and theology at the University of Saragossa, where he acquired a master's degree. Also during this period of time, all along with another friend, Lax fatally wounded another student by hitting his head. He later moved to Paris, and there he taught in 1507–1508 at the Collège de Calvi and then at the Collège de Montaigu, where he was a student of John Mair (or Major) and simultaneously was a teacher himself. In Paris he was known as the "Prince of Sophists," and his works and lessons were very praised. He taught in Paris until 1516, and then returned to Spain. Some researchers think there was an attempt by some of king Charles V's servants to appoint him University of Saragossa's High Master, just as they had tried to appoint Erasmus as High Chancellor of the same university during the same months. In the end this was not possible, and he was appointed as a teacher in the university of Huesca, that same year. There he taught until 1520, when he became University of Saragosa's High Master (similar to a dean), vice-chancellor and rector, and also was simultaneously one of the four Masters of Arts, a position very similar to Arts faculty's professor in other universities. There he had his brilliant nephew Michael Servetus as a student in the same university, who also became in 1525 one of the four Masters of Arts. During this period of time Lax, who had Erasmian friends, permitted that Erasmus's works be read and taught in the university. In 1527 apparently Lax attacked his nephew and colleague Michael Servetus in a violent brawl of which no other details are known, but that got Servetus expelled. The most probable causes of this clash is that Servetus would have started talking of his "heretic" theological ideas, or that Lax had silenced Servetus's probable collaboration in his work Quaestiones phyisicales, which just 11 days before had started to get in print. Lax remained University of Saragossa's High master, teaching arts, until his death at Saragossa in 1560, blind and with gout in his hands.

== Works ==
- Tractatus exponibilitum Propositionum, 1507
- De Syllogismis, 1509
- De Solubilibus et Insolubilibus, 1511
- De Oppositionibus Propositionum cathegoricarum et earum Aequipollentiis, 1512
- De Impositionibus y Obligationes, 1512
- Arithmetica speculativa, 1515
- Proportiones, 1515
- De proportionibus arithmeticis, 1515
- Quaestiones phisicales, 1527

== Bibliography ==
- The Arithmetica of Lax is discussed in David Eugene Smith Rara Arithmetica, Boston, London 1908.
- The logic and philosophy of Lax are discussed in Marcial Solana Historia de la filosofia española, Época del Renacimiento (siglo XVI), Madrid 1941, Vol. III, pp. 19–33.
