= List of philosophical organizations =

This is a list of philosophical organizations and societies.

- Academia Analitica
- American Association of Philosophy Teachers
- American Catholic Philosophical Association
- American Ethical Union
- American Philosophical Association
- American Philosophical Society
- American Society for Aesthetics
- American Society for Political and Legal Philosophy
- Animal Rights Cambridge
- Arché (research center)
- Aristotelian Society
- Association for Logic, Language and Information
- Association for Symbolic Logic
- Association for the Scientific Study of Consciousness
- Australasian Association of Philosophy
- Batavian Society for Experimental Philosophy
- British Philosophical Association
- British Society for Ethical Theory
- British Society of Aesthetics
- Café Philosophique
- Cambridge Philosophical Society
- Canadian House of Commons Standing Committee on Access to Information, Privacy and Ethics
- Canadian Philosophical Association
- Canadian Society for History and Philosophy of Mathematics
- Carnegie Council for Ethics in International Affairs
- Center for Ethics at Yeshiva University
- Center for Religion, Ethics and Social Policy
- Center for the Study of Ethics in the Professions
- Centre de Recherche en Epistémologie Appliquée
- Centre for Applied Ethics
- Centre for Applied Philosophy and Public Ethics (CAPPE)
- Centre for History and Philosophy of Science, University of Leeds
- Charity International
- Citizens for Responsibility and Ethics in Washington
- Commission on Federal Ethics Law Reform
- Committee on Publication Ethics
- Computer Ethics Institute
- Concerned Philosophers for Peace
- Conscious enterprise
- CPNSS
- Cumberland School of Law's Center for Biotechnology, Law, and Ethics
- District of Columbia Board of Elections and Ethics
- Ethics & Religious Liberty Commission
- Ethics and Democracy Network
- Ethics and Excellence in Journalism Foundation
- Ethics and Public Policy Center
- Ethics Commission
- Ethics Committee (European Union)
- Ethics Resource Center
- European Society for Analytic Philosophy
- European Society for Philosophy and Psychology
- Federal Ethics Committee on Non-Human Biotechnology
- Foundation for Thought and Ethics
- German Society for Philosophy of Science
- Hegel Society of America
- Hegel Society of Great Britain
- History of Early Analytic Philosophy Society
- Houston Philosophical Society
- Human Genetics Commission
- Institute for Ethics and Emerging Technologies
- Institute for Global Ethics
- Institute for Science, Ethics and Innovation
- Institutional review board
- International Association for Computing and Philosophy
- International Association for Philosophy and Literature
- International Association for Philosophy of Law and Social Philosophy
- International Association of Empirical Aesthetics
- International Bioethics Committee
- International Federation of Philosophical Societies
- International Humanist and Ethical Union
- International Society for Environmental Ethics
- International Society for Philosophy of Music Education
- International Society for the History of Philosophy of Science
- International Society for the History of Rhetoric
- Jeffersonville Ethics Commission
- John Dewey Society
- John Locke Society
- John Stuart Mill Institute
- Karl Jaspers Society of North America
- Kenan Institute for Ethics
- Kennedy Institute of Ethics
- Kurt Gödel Society
- Literary and Philosophical Society of Newcastle upon Tyne
- Maguire Center for Ethics
- Malaysian Philosophy Society
- Manchester Literary and Philosophical Society
- Markkula Center for Applied Ethics
- Melbourne School of Continental Philosophy
- Metaphysical Society
- Metaphysical Society of America
- National Commission for the Protection of Human Subjects of Biomedical and Behavioral Research
- Nevada Commission on Ethics
- Oklahoma Ethics Commission
- Pennsylvania State Ethics Commission
- Phi Sigma Tau
- Philomatic society
- Philosophy Documentation Center
- Philosophy of Science Association
- Philosophy Sharing Foundation
- Presidential Commission for the Study of Bioethical Issues
- Royal Institute of Philosophy
- Royal Institution of South Wales
- Royal Philosophical Society of Glasgow
- Saturday Club (Boston, Massachusetts)
- Semiotic Society of America
- Shalom Hartman Institute
- Society for Applied Philosophy
- Society for Business Ethics
- Society for Ethics and Philosophy
- Society for Phenomenology and Existential Philosophy
- Society for Philosophical Inquiry
- Society for Philosophy and Psychology
- Society of Christian Philosophers
- Socrates Cafe
- St James Ethics Centre
- Swiss Center for Affective Sciences
- Telos Institute
- Tennessee Philosophical Association
- Texas Ethics Commission
- The British Society for the Philosophy of Religion
- The Internationale Hegel-Gesellschaft
- The Internationale Hegel-Vereinigung
- The Metaphysical Club
- The Philosophical Society of England
- Thomas-Institut
- United States House Committee on Standards of Official Conduct
- United States Office of Government Ethics
- United States Senate Select Committee on Ethics
- University Philosophical Society (Trinity College, Dublin)
- Van Leer Jerusalem Institute
- VERITAS/ philosophy students
- Wesleyan Philosophical Society
- York virtuosi
- Yorkshire Philosophical Society
