= California Fair Political Practices Commission =

Fair Political Practices Commission

Commission overview
- Jurisdiction: California
- Headquarters: 1102 Q Street, Suite 3000, Sacramento, California; 38°34′18.0264″N 121°29′41.406″W
- Employees: 80
- Annual budget: $12.929 m USD (2018-2019)
- Key document: Political Reform Act of 1974
- Website: fppc.ca.gov

The Fair Political Practices Commission (FPPC) of California is a five-member independent nonpartisan commission that has primary responsibility for the impartial and effective administration of the Political Reform Act of 1974. The commission's objectives are to ensure that public officials act in a fair and unbiased manner in the governmental decision-making process, to promote transparency in government, and to foster public trust in the political system.

The commission is similar to the Federal Election Commission (FEC) in its campaign finance responsibilities. It differs from the FEC in its authority in lobbying and conflicts of interest.

It was created by California Proposition 9 in the June 1974 elections, known as the Political Reform Act of 1974, regulates campaign financing, conflicts of interest, lobbying, and governmental ethics.

== Organization ==
Commissioner	Position	Term	Appointing Officer
Adam E. Silver	Chair	2024-2027	Governor Gavin Newsom
E. Dotson Wilson	Commissioner	2019–2027	Governor Gavin Newsom
Abby Wood	Commissioner	2021–2025	Secretary of State Shirley Weber
Catharine Baker	Commissioner	2021–2025	Controller Betty Yee
Elsa Ortiz	Commissioner	2022-2025	Attorney General Rob Bonta

Commission Executive Director and Division Chiefs
Name	Position
Galena West	Executive Director
David Bainbridge	General Counsel
James Lindsay	Chief of Enforcement
Jue Wang	Chief of Administration
Shrdha Shah	Chief of Audits and Assistance

== List of Fair Political Practices Commissioner Chairs ==
Chair	Term
Daniel Lowenstein	1975–1979
Tom Houston	1979–1983
Dan Stanford	1983–1985
John Larson	1986–1991
Ben Davidian	1991–1995
Ravi Mehta	1995–1997
James Hall	1997–1999
Karen Getman	1999–2003
Liane Randolph	2003–2007
Ross Johnson	2007–2010
Dan Schnur	2010–2011
Ann Ravel	2011–2014
Jodi Remke	2015–2018
Alice Germond	2018-2019
Richard Miadich	2019–2024
Adam E. Silver	2024–Present

== Electronic filing and data ==
Campaign finance and lobbying disclosure data filed with the Secretary of State under the Political Reform Act is published on the California Automated Lobbying and Campaign Contribution and Expenditure Search System (CAL-ACCESS), a publicly accessible online database maintained by the California Secretary of State. CAL-ACCESS contains records dating to the early 2000s, including contributions received, expenditures made, and lobbying activity disclosures.

The FPPC defines filing requirements and form specifications, while the Secretary of State's office manages the technical infrastructure for receiving, storing, and publishing electronic filings. California requires approximately 35 distinct filing form types for campaign finance and lobbying disclosure, grouped into registration statements, periodic disclosure statements, 24-hour reports of large contributions and expenditures near elections, amendments, termination statements, and special filings including lobbying reports.

Bulk data downloads of the full CAL-ACCESS database are available through the Secretary of State's campaign finance data page.

== See also ==
- Politics of California
- Campaign finance
- Conflict of Interest
- Lobbying in the United States
- Nevada Commission on Ethics
- New Mexico State Ethics Commission
- Oklahoma Ethics Commission
- Pennsylvania State Ethics Commission
- Texas Ethics Commission
- Wisconsin Ethics Commission
