= Ethics commission =

In the United States, an Ethics Commission is a commission established by State law or county or city ordinance to investigate dishonest or unethical practices by public employees and elected officials.

== See also ==
- California Fair Political Practices Commission
- Florida Commission on Ethics
- Nevada Commission on Ethics
- New Mexico State Ethics Commission
- Oklahoma Ethics Commission
- Oregon Government Ethics Commission
- Pennsylvania State Ethics Commission
- San Francisco Ethics Commission
- Texas Ethics Commission
- Wisconsin Ethics Commission
