= List of philosophies =

The following is a list of philosophies, schools of thought and philosophical movements.

== A ==
Absurdism – Academic skepticism – Accelerationism - Achintya Bheda Abheda – Action, philosophy of – Actual idealism – Actualism – Advaita Vedanta – Aesthetic Realism – Aesthetics – African philosophy – Afrocentrism – Agential realism – Agnosticism – Agnostic theism – Ajātivāda – Ājīvika – Ajñana – Alexandrian school – Alexandrists – Ambedkarism – American philosophy – Analytical Thomism – Analytic philosophy – Anarchism – Ancient philosophy – Animism – Anomalous monism – Anthropocentrism – Antinatalism – Antinomianism – Antipositivism – Anti-psychiatry – Anti-realism – Antireductionism – Applied ethics – Archaeology, philosophy of – Aristotelianism – Arithmetic, philosophy of – Artificial intelligence, philosophy of – Art, philosophy of – Asceticism – Atheism – Atomism – Augustinianism – Australian realism – Authoritarianism – Averroism – Avicennism – Axiology – Aztec philosophy

== B ==
Baptists – Bayesianism – Behaviorism – Bioconservatism – Biology, philosophy of – Biosophy – Bluestocking – Brahmoism – British idealism – Budapest School – Buddhist atomism – Buddhist philosophy – Business philosophy

== C ==
Cambridge Platonists – Cambridge Ritualists – Capitalism – Carlyleanism – Carolingian Renaissance – Cartesianism – Categorical imperative – Chance, Philosophy of – Changzhou School of Thought – Charvaka – Chinese naturalism – Christian existentialism – Christian humanism – Christian neoplatonism – Christian mysticism – Christian philosophy – Chinese philosophy – Classical Marxism – Cognitivism – Collegium Conimbricense – Color, philosophy of – Common Sense, philosophy of – Communism – Communitarianism – Compatibilism and incompatibilism – Computationalism – Conceptualism – Confirmation holism – Confucianism – Connectionism – Consequentialism – Conservatism – Constructivist epistemology – Continental philosophy – Cosmicism – Cosmopolitanism – Critical rationalism – Critical realism – Critical realism (philosophy of the social sciences) – Critical theory – Culture, philosophy of – Cyberfeminism – Cynicism – Cyrenaics – Czech philosophy

== D ==
Danish philosophy – Daoism – Deconstruction – Deep ecology – Deism – Denialism – Deontology – Depressionism – Design, philosophy of – Determinism – Dialectic – Dialectical materialism – Dialogue, philosophy of – Didacticism – Digital physics – Discordianism – Doubting Antiquity School – Dualistic cosmology – Dvaita – Dvaitadvaita

== E ==
Eating, philosophy of – Ecocentrism – Economics, philosophy of – Ecumenism – Education, philosophy of – Egalitarianism – Egocentrism – Egoism – Egoist anarchism – Eleatics – Eliminative materialism – Emanationism – Emergentism – Emotivism – Empiricism – Engineering, philosophy of – Ephesian school – Epicureanism – Epiphenomenalism – Epistemological nihilism – Epistemology – Eretrian school – Esotericism – Essentialism – Eternalism – Ethics – Ethiopian philosophy – Eudaimonism – Existentialism – Externalism

== F ==
Fallibilism – Familialism – Fascism – Fatalism – Feminist philosophy – Fictionalism – Fideism – Filial piety – Film, philosophy of – Formalism (literature) – Formalism (philosophy) – Foundationalism – Frankfurt School – Free will – Fugitives (poets) – Fundamentalism – Futility, philosophy of

== G ==
Gaia philosophy – Gandhism – Gaudiya Vaishnavism – Geographical philosophy – German historical school – German idealism – German philosophy – Gnosticism – Greek philosophy

== H ==
Haskalah – Healthcare, philosophy of – Hedonism – Hegelianism – Hellenistic philosophy – Henotheism – Hermeticism – Heterophenomenology – Hindu philosophy – Historical materialism – Historicism – History of religions school – History, philosophy of – Holism – Homaranismo – Hongaku – Huang–Lao – Humanism – Humanistic naturalism – Hylozoism

== I ==
Idealism – Identityism – Ideological criticism – Ignosticism – Illegalism – Illuminationism – Indian logic – Indian philosophy – Indigenous American philosophy – Individualism – Indonesian philosophy – Inductionism – Induction / Informal logic – Information, philosophy of – Innatism – Instrumentalism – Instrumental rationality – Intellectualism – Interactionism (philosophy of mind) – Internalism and externalism – Intuitionism – Ionian school - Iranian philosophy – Irrealism (philosophy) - Irrealism (the arts) – Islamic ethics – Islamic philosophy – Italian school

== J ==
Jainism – Japanese philosophy – Jewish philosophy – Jingoism – Juche – Judeo-Islamic philosophies (800–1400) – Just war theory

== K ==
Kabbalah – Kantianism – Keynesianism – Kaozheng – Korean philosophy – Krausism – Kyoto school

== L ==
Lamarckism – Language, philosophy of – Law, philosophy of – Lawsonomy – Legal positivism – Legal realism – Legalism (Chinese philosophy) – Leninism – Liberalism – Liberal naturalism – Libertarianism – Libertarianism (metaphysics) – Libertinism – Linguistics, philosophy of – Logic – Logical atomism – Logical positivism – Logicians – Logic in China – Logic in Islamic philosophy – Logicism – Logic, philosophy of – Love, philosophy of – Luddism – Lwów–Warsaw school – Lysenkoism

== M ==
Madhyamaka – Mahayana Buddhism- Manichaeism – Maoism – Marburg school – Marxism – Marxist humanism – Marxism–Leninism – Marxism–Leninism–Maoism – Marxist philosophy of nature – Materialism – Mathematicism – Mathematics education, philosophy of – Mathematics, philosophy of – Maxim (philosophy) – Mechanism – Medical ethics – Medievalism – Medieval philosophy – Megarian school – Mentalism – Mereological nihilism – Merism – Meta-ethics – Meta-philosophy – Metaphysics – Milesian school – Mimamsa – Mind-body dualism – Mind, philosophy of – Misology – Mitogaku – Modern Islamic philosophy – Modernism – Modistae – Mohism – Molinism – Monism – Moral absolutism – Moral realism – Moral relativism – Moral skepticism – Motion, philosophy of – Music, philosophy of – Mysticism - Marchiavellianism

== N ==
Naïve realism – Naturalism – Natural Science, philosophy of – Natural Supernaturalism – Nature, philosophy of – Nazism – Negative utilitarianism – Neo-Confucianism – Neoconservatism – Neo-Hegelianism – Neohumanism – Neoliberalism – Neo-Luddism – Neo-Kantianism – Neo-Marxism – Neo-medievalism – Neoplatonism – Neopositivism – Neopragmatism – Neopythagoreanism – Neoromanticism – Neo-Scholasticism – Neostoicism – Neotaoism – Neo Vedanta – Neuroethics – Neurophilosophy – Neuroscience, philosophy of – Neurotheology – Neutral monism – New Age – New Criticism – New Culture Movement – New Formalism – New humanism (literature) – New Life Movement – New realism – New Thought – Nichiren Buddhism – Nihilism – Nominalism – Non-cognitivism – Nondualism – Non-philosophy – Non-theism – Nyaya

== O ==
Objective idealism – Objectivism – Occamism – Occasionalism – Olympism – Ontology – Ontotheology – Open individualism – Organicism – Oxford Calculators – Oxford Franciscan school

== P ==
Paganism – Pakistani philosophy – Panbabylonism – Pancasila – Pancritical rationalism – Pandeism – Panentheism – Panpsychism – Pantheism – Pataphysics – Perception, philosophy of – Perennial philosophy – Perfectionism – Peripatetic school – Personalism – Perspectivism – Pessimism – Phenomenalism – Phenomenology – Philosophes – Philosophical anthropology – Philosophy, philosophy of – Physicalism – Physical ontology – Physics, philosophy of – Platonic epistemology – Platonic idealism – Platonic realism – Platonism – Pluralism – Pluralism (Presocratic) – Political philosophy – Populism – Port-Royal schools – Posadism – Positivism – Postanalytic philosophy – Postgenderism - Posthumanism – Post-materialism – Post-modernism – Postpositivism – Post-structuralism – Practical reason – Pragmatism – Praxis School – Predeterminism – Presentism – Pre-Socratic philosophy – Probabilism – Process philosophy – Progressivism – Property dualism – Pseudophilosophy – Psychiatry, philosophy of – Psychological egoism – Psychology, philosophy of – Pure practical reason – Pure reason – Pyrrhonian skepticism – Pyrrhonism – Pythagoreanism

== Q ==
Qingtan – Quantum mysticism – Quietism

== R ==
Radical behaviorism – Raëlism – Rastafari – Rationalism – Realism – Reconstructivism – Reductionism – Reductive materialism – Reformational philosophy – Relationalism – Relativism – Relevance logic – Reliabilism – Religion, philosophy of – Religious language, philosophy of – Religious humanism – Religious philosophy – Renaissance humanism – Representationalism – Romanian philosophy – Romanticism – Russian cosmism – Religious Zionism – Russian formalism – Russian philosophy

== S ==
Sabellianism – Sanatan Dharma – Sankhya – Sarvastivada – Sautrantika – Scholasticism – School of Names – School of Salamanca – School of the Sextii – Science, philosophy of – Scientism – Scotism – Scottish common sense realism – Scottish philosophy – Secular humanism – Secularism – Self, philosophy of – Semantic holism – Sensualism – Sexism – Sex, philosophy of – Sexualism – Shamanism – Shaktism - Shaykhism – Shuddhadvaita – Sikhism – Singularitarianism – Situationist theory – Skeptical theism – Skepticism – Socialism – Social liberalism – Social philosophy – Social science, philosophy of – Solipsism – Sophism – Southern Agrarians – Space and time, philosophy of – Speculative realism – Spiritualism – Spiritual philosophy – Sport, philosophy of – Statistics, philosophy of – Stoicism – Structuralism – Subjective idealism – Subjectivism – Sufi metaphysics – Sufi philosophy – Śūnyatā – Supersessionism – Synoptic philosophy – Systems philosophy

== T ==
Taoism – Teleology – Tetralemma – Theism – Theistic finitism – Thelema – Theology – Theosophy – Theravada Buddhism – Thermal and statistical physics, philosophy of – Thomas Carlyle, philosophy of – Thomism – Three Principles of the People – Traditionalist School – Transcendental idealism – Transcendentalism – Transcendent theosophy – Transhumanism – Transmodernism – Type physicalism

== U ==
Ubuntu – Universalism – Universality – Utilitarian bioethics – Utilitarianism – Utopian socialism

== V ==
Vaibhashika – Value pluralism – Value theory – Vedanta – Verificationism – Verism – Vienna Circle – Virtue ethics – Vishishtadvaita – Vitalism – Voluntarism – Voluntaryism – Vivartavada

== W ==
Wahdat-ul-Shuhud – Wahdat-ul-Wujood – War, philosophy of – Weimar Classicism – Western philosophy – Wu wei

== X ==
Xenofeminism – Xueheng School

== Y ==
Yogachara – Young Hegelians

== Z ==
Zen – Zoroastrianism – Zurvanism

== See also ==
- Glossary of philosophy
- List of philosophical organizations
