= Albert F. Bellows =

American painter (1829–1883)

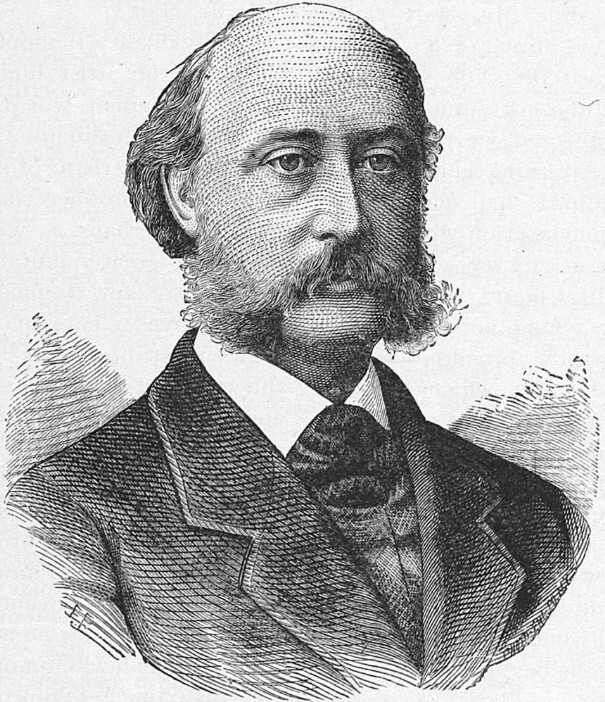
- Portrait of Bellows on his obituary
- Born: Albert Fitch Bellows; November 20, 1829; Milford, Massachusetts, U.S.
- Died: November 24, 1883 (aged 54); Auburndale, Massachusetts, U.S.
- Occupations: genre painter, landscape painter

Albert Fitch Bellows (20 November 1829 – 24 November 1883) was an American genre and landscape painter of the Hudson River School. He was one of the early members of the American Watercolor Society. He excelled in painting in both oil and watercolor, and was one of the first in America to attempt large etching in plates. He gained great popularity in painting typical scenes in the rural life of both New England and Old England villages.

== Biography ==
=== Early years ===
Bellows was born at Milford, Massachusetts to physician Albert J. Bellows, the author of The Philosophy of Eating. They claimed they came from the first settlers of New England. When he was 4 years old, he and his father moved to Salem, Massachusetts. Some sources say he was first apprenticed by Boston lithographer John Henry Bufford at the age of fifteen. He was first showed interest in drawing but his father managed to put him as a pupil of Ammi B. Young when he was 16 years old. After 3 years of pupilage, at the age of 20 he graduated, and quickly formed a partnership with Boston architect John D. Towle to do the artistic designing in the Towle & Bellows firm.

However, Bellows quickly turned back into painting after a year with Towle. From 1840 to 1846 he became a principal at the New England School of Design. When he was 27 years of age, he resigned his post to travel and study abroad, and spent time in Paris to look at the art of the first Paris Exposition. He became a pupil in the Royal Academy of Arts in Antwerp and became an honorary member there.

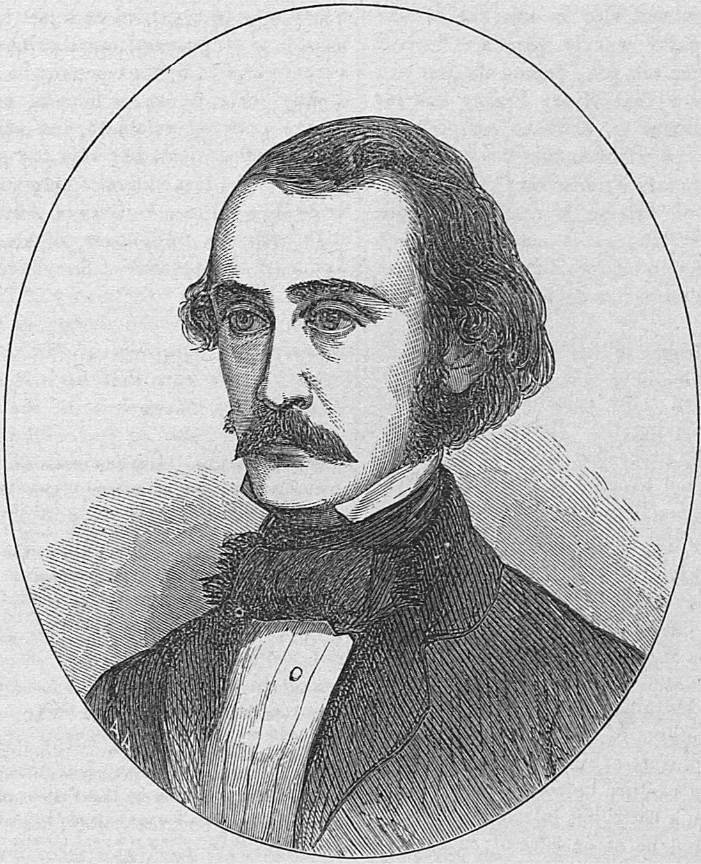
Bellows in 1859

=== Return to New York ===
Bellows settled in New York City in 1858 on his return to America. He spent most of his remaining career in New York, though he briefly moved to Boston. In 1859, he was elected into the National Academy of Design as an Associate member, and became a full academian in 1861. He visited Europe again in 1867, making sketches and studies in England and France. In the Great Boston Fire of 1872, the fire destroyed his paintings, and then he opened a studio in New York City in the same building as many of the notable Hudson River School artists of the time. He gradually withdrew partially from figure-painting in favor of landscape.

=== Hudson River School ===
Bellows differed from most Hudson River School artists in that he became skilled at watercolor, and treatise on watercolor painting, Water-Color Painting: Some Facts and Authorities in Relation to Its Durability. He eventually maintained two studios, one for oil paintings and one for watercolor. He was a member of the American Watercolor Society, and an honorary member of the Royal Belgian Society of Watercolorists.

Bellows also mastered etching—along with Samuel Colman he was possibly the only other Hudson River School artist to do so—and became a member of the New York Etching Club, the Philadelphia Society of Etchers and the Royal Society of Painter-Etchers and Engravers in London, an esteemed professional organization whose members included James Abbott McNeill Whistler and Francis Seymour Haden. He was one of the original members of the American Art-Union and a member for almost twenty years at the Century Club at New York City.

He sent some of his works to the Philadelphia Centennial Exposition and the 1878 Paris Exposition.

Bellows taught at the Cooper Union, where among his pupils was Virginia Granbery.

== Death ==
He died in Auburndale, Massachusetts, on the 24th of November 1883 to an unknown illness.

== Gallery ==
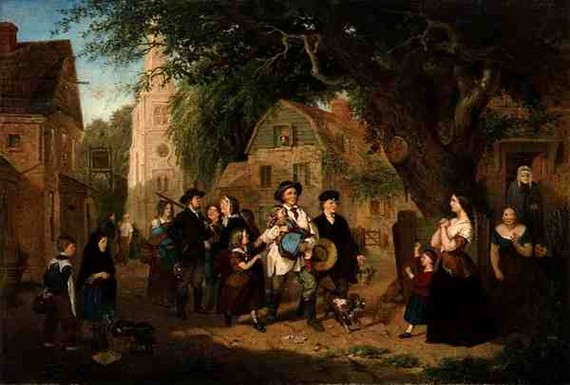
The Lost Child Returned, 1857

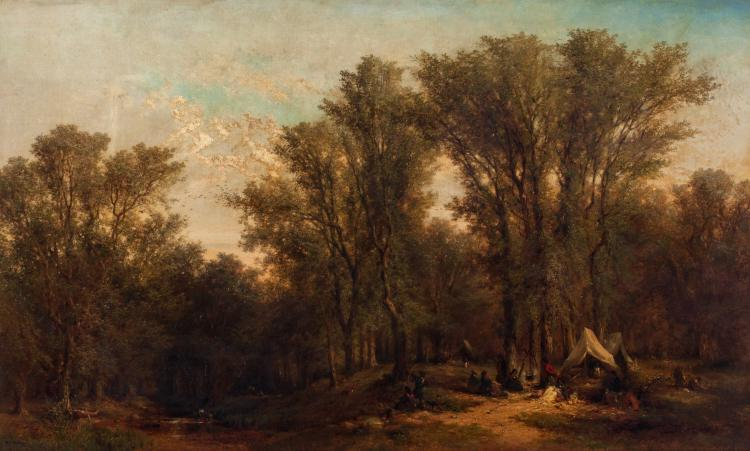
Forest life, encampment on the Penobscot, 1860

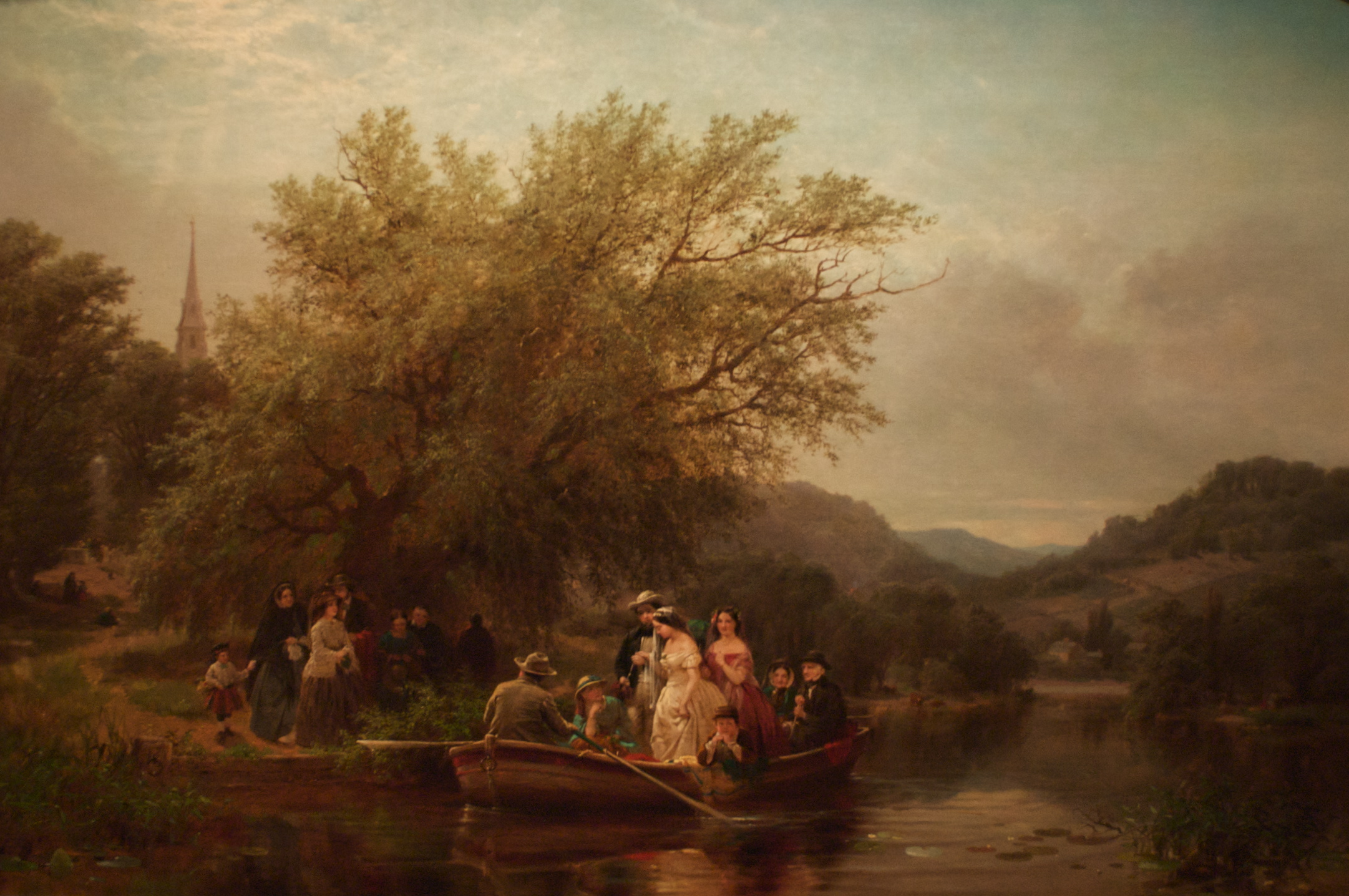
The Wedding Party, 1861

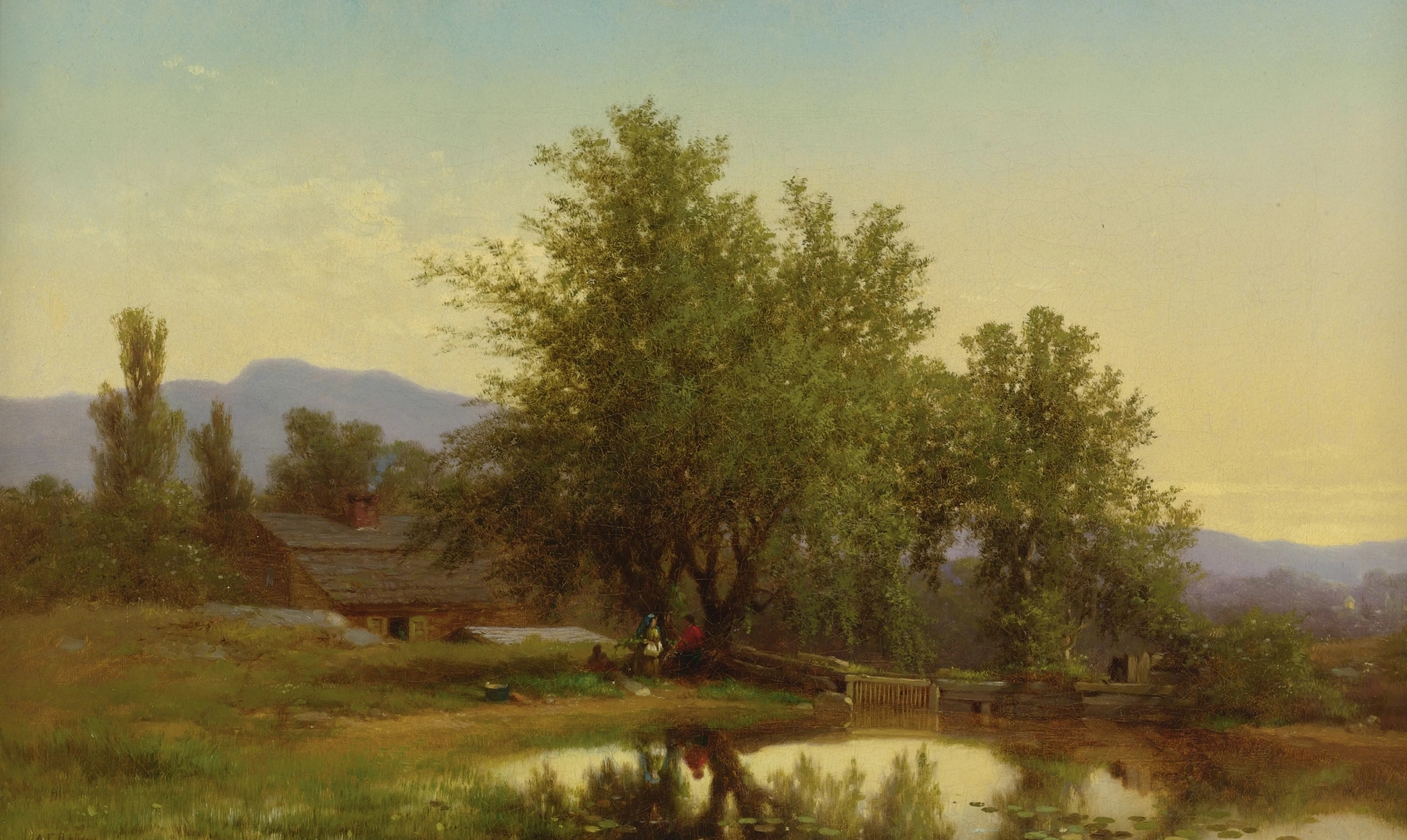
Landscape with Pond, Barn and Figures, 1862

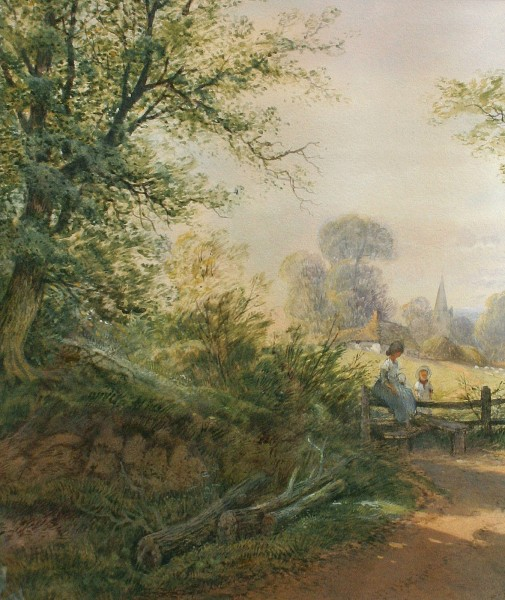
A Quiet Nook, 1869
