= Nijaz Ibrulj =

Bosnian philosopher

- Born: 2 July 1956 (age 69); Sarajevo, SR Bosnia and Herzegovina, SFR Yugoslavia

Philosophical work
- Era: Contemporary philosophy
- Region: Western philosophy
- School: Analytic philosophy
- Main interests: Logic, Philosophy of mind, Philosophy of language, Cognitive science
- Notable ideas: Principle of the Logical

Nijaz Ibrulj (born 2 July 1956) is a Bosnian philosopher and a professor at the University of Sarajevo's Department of Philosophy and Sociology. He lectures on logic, analytic philosophy, methodology of social sciences, theory of knowledge, and cognitive science. His interests also extend to the field of social ontology. Ibrulj was awarded a Fulbright Visiting Scholarship during the 2000-2001 academic years to visit the University of California, Berkeley. His application was sponsored by John Searle and Donald Davidson.

== Academic activities ==
Ibrulj is the founder and president of the Academia Analitica, a scientific society for the development of logic and analytic philosophy in Bosnia and Herzegovina and leader of the "ZINK", a scientific and research incubator. He is the founding editor of SOPHOS, a young researchers’ journal and of The Logical Foresight, a journal for logic and science.

== Work in philosophy ==
Ibrulj has written extensively on various topics of analytic philosophy, philosophical logic, and philosophy of language, cognitive science and social ontology.

In his book Philosophy of Logic (1999), he introduced a theory named the Principle of the Logical. He defines the Principle of the Logical as an ideal matrix of the logical principles or laws of thought (the law of identity, the law of non-contradiction, the law of excluded middle, the law of sufficient reason).

In the book The Century of Rearrangement (2005), Ibrulj investigated the concepts of relation between identity and knowledge in an ambient of intelligent space, which is designed by modern informational and communicational technology, nanoscience and nanotechnology, and the processes of globalisation. He made a distinction between two theories of identity: a strong theory of identity (“anchored identity”) and a weak theory of identity (“mobile identity” or “identity in action”).

Ibrulj has also translated from English (Donald Davidson), German (Gottlob Frege), and Ancient Greek (Bosnian–Greek edition of Porphyry's Isagoge).

== Bibliography ==
=== Books ===
- Philosophy of Logic (1999) ISBN 9958-21-112-2
- The Century of Rearrangements. Essays on Identity, Knowledge and Society. (2005) ISBN 9958-9419-0-2
- Comments. Reviews. Critiques. (2021) ISBN 978-9926-8424-2-0
- Essays on the Logical, (2022) ISBN 978-9926-8424-5-1
- Analytic Philosophy, (2022) ISBN 978-9926-8424-6-8
- Porphiry's Legacy in Bosnia, (2023) ISBN 978-9926-8424-8-2
- Članci - I (1990-2015), (2025) ISBN 978-9926-8815-3-5
- Essays on the Logical, (2026) ISBN 978-9926-8815-4-2
- Članci - I (1990-2015), (2026) ISBN 978-9926-8815-5-9

=== Articles ===
- Bosnia Porphyriana. An Outline of the Development of Logic in Bosnia and Herzegovina in Pregled, 2, 2009.
- National Dogmatism or the Logic of Consotiation? in Pregled, 1-2, 2006.
- Radical Interpretation of Identity 2008.
- The Adjustment Of Identity: Inquiries into Logic and Semantics of an Uncertain World in Prolegomena, 1, 2005.
- The Rational Construction of the World from Ontology of Sign in Dijalog, 1/2, 2005.
- One-dimensional Society in Pregled, 1/2, 2005.
- The Adjustment of Identity : Inquiries into Logic and Semantics of an Uncertain World in Studia Humana, 2012
- National dogmatism or the logic of consociation? in LOGIC IN CENTRAL AND EASTERN EUROPE, (2013) ISBN 978-0-7618-5891-1
- Bosnia Porphyriana : an outline of the development of logic in Bosnia and Herzegovina in LOGIC IN CENTRAL AND EASTERN EUROPE, (2013) ISBN 978-0-7618-5891-1
- Prepričanje v umno prakso, epistemsko družbenost in epistemsko kulturo in Filozofska pot Andreja Uleta, (2019) ISBN 978-961-06-0187-6
- Some Characteristics of the Referential and Inferential Predication in Classical Logic in The Logical Foresight, 1/2021.
- New Remarks on the Concept in Logical Use in The Logical Foresight, 1/2021.
- Logical Identity: a Holistic Approach in The Logical Foresight, 1/2021.
- Implicitness of Logos and Explicitness of Logics in Ancient Philosophy in The Logical Foresight, 1/2022,
- Basics of Second-Order Logic in The Logical Foresight, 1/2023,
- Aristotle's First Philosophy as Analytical Epistemology in The Logical Foresight, 1/2023,

=== Foreword ===
- Phenomenology of Anomalous Causality in I.Komsic: The Theory of Social Pulsation, (2017) ISBN 978-1-4331-3703-7
- The Poetry as a Semantical Consciousness in I.Seletkovic: The Palms Sweate of Waiting. (2020) ISBN 978-953-354-269-0

=== Translations ===
- Frege, Gottlob Der Gedanke. Eine logische Untersuchung in Dijalog, 1-2, 1989.
- Davidson, Donald Semantics for Natural Languages in Odjek, 1-2, 1997.
- Davidson, Donald Truth and Meaning in Dijalog, 2, 1998.
- Porphyrius Eisagoge (Isagoge) in Dijalog, 1, 2008.
- Searle, John R. What is an Institution? in Sophos, 2018.
- Searle, John R. Social Ontology:Some BasicPrinciples in Sophos, 2018.
- Quine, Willard Van Orman The Logical Truth in Sophos, 2018.
- Davidson, Donald Seeing Through Language in Sophos, 2019.
- Quine, Willard Van Orman Things and their place in theories in Sophos, 2019.
- Quine, Willard Van Orman Notes on the Theory of Reference in Sophos, 2019.
- Austin, John L. Truth in Sophos, 2019.
- Searle, John R. The Language and Social Reality in Život, 2019.
- Putnam, Hilary. Representation and Reality (Chapter 1. Meaning and Mentalism). Sophos, No.14/2021
- Kripke, Saul A. A Completeness Theorem in Modal Logic, Sophos No.14/2021.
- Brandom, Robert B. Artificial Intelligence and Analytical Pragmatism. Sophos No.15/2022.
- Davidson, Donald A Unified Theory of Thought, Meaning, and Action, Sophos No.15/2022.
- Davidson, Donald Rational Animals, Sophos No.15/2022.
- Davidson, Donald Incoherence and Irrationality, Sophos No.17/2024.
