= Parrhesia (journal) =

Parrhesia: A Journal of Critical Philosophy
- Discipline: Continental philosophy
- Language: English
- Edited by: Arne de Boever, Amy Stuart, Sean McMorrow, Ashley Woodward, Justin Clemens, Joe Hughes, Jessica Marian, Lucy Benjamin

Publication details
- History: 2006–present
- Open access: yes

Standard abbreviations
- ISO 4: Parrhesia

Indexing
- ISSN: 1834-3287

Links
- Journal homepage

Parrhesia: A Journal of Critical Philosophy is an international open-access journal of Critical Philosophy affiliated with Melbourne School of Continental Philosophy. It is edited by four MSCP members: Alex Murray, Matthew Sharpe, Jon Roffe and Ashley Woodward. It was launched in 2006 and has included articles by Alain Badiou and Jacques Rancière.

The title of the journal is a reference to Michel Foucault and has shaped the character of journal submissions:

"Michel Foucault's last works tell us that parrhesia is the act of fearlessly speaking the truth. To engage in parrhesia is never, however, a 'neutral' act. Parrhesia simultaneously incorporates aesthetic and ethical dimensions. The parrhesiast is someone whose fidelity to the truth becomes the pivot of a process of self-transformation."

In the spirit of Critical Philosophy, the editors of the journal aim "to gather a range of thinkers to examine the intersections between questions of subjectivity, politics, ethics, aesthetics and truth, intersections which both theoretically and practically form the critical points in our culture and in our time. As Walter Benjamin suggests it is these 'perilous critical moments' upon which the very act of reading, writing and thinking must be based."

== See also ==
- List of philosophy journals
