= Agostino Nifo =

Italian philosopher

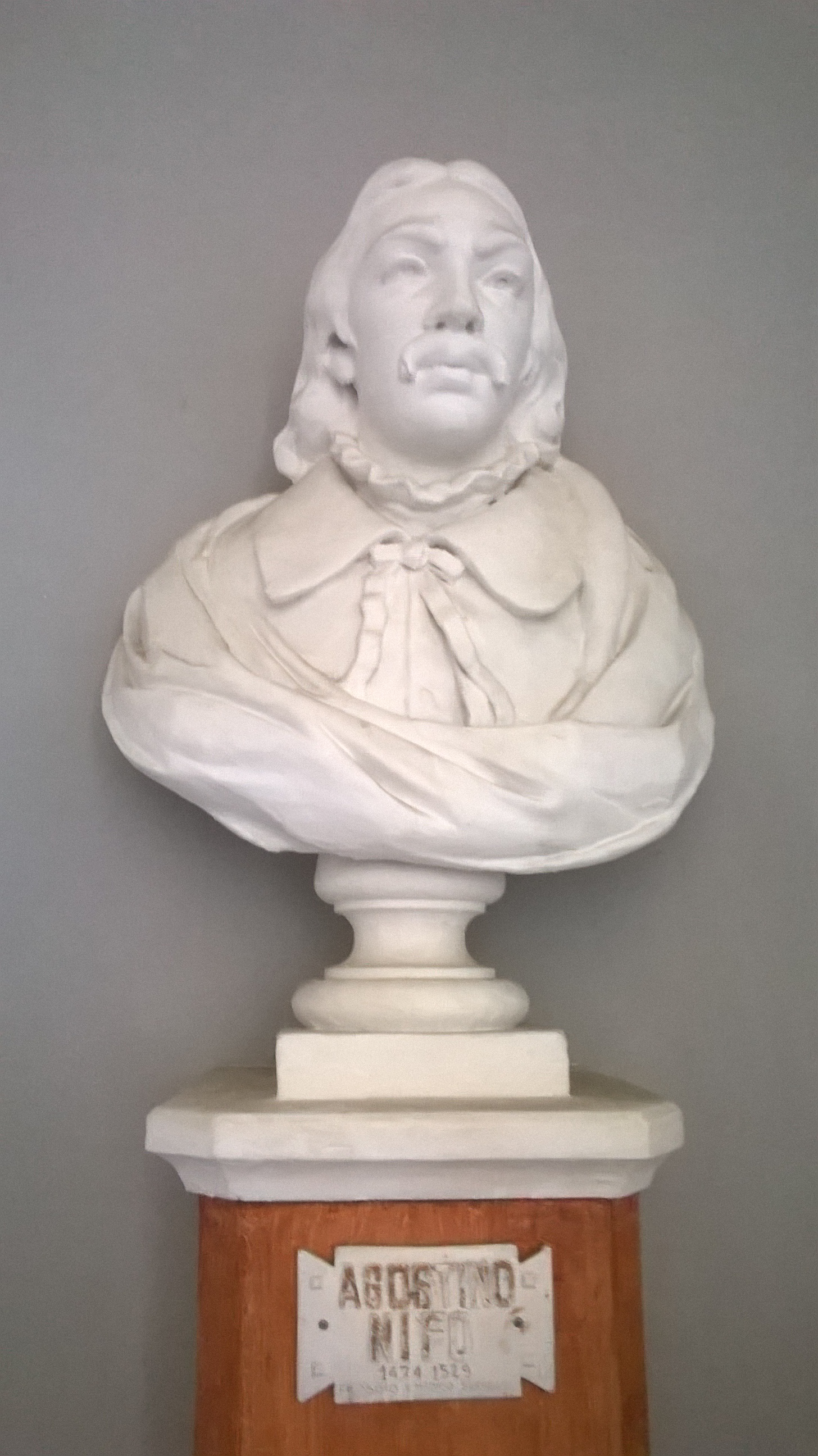
Bust of Agostino Nifo (Liceo classico "Agostino Nifo", Sessa Aurunca)

Agostino Nifo (Latinized as Augustinus Niphus; c. 1473 – 1538 or 1545) was an Italian philosopher and commentator.

== Life ==
He was born at Sessa Aurunca near Naples. He proceeded to Padua, where he studied philosophy. He lectured at Padua, Naples, Rome, and Pisa, and won so high a reputation that he was deputed by Leo X to defend the Catholic doctrine of immortality against the attack of Pomponazzi and the Alexandrists. In return for this he was made Count Palatine, with the right to call himself by the name Medici.

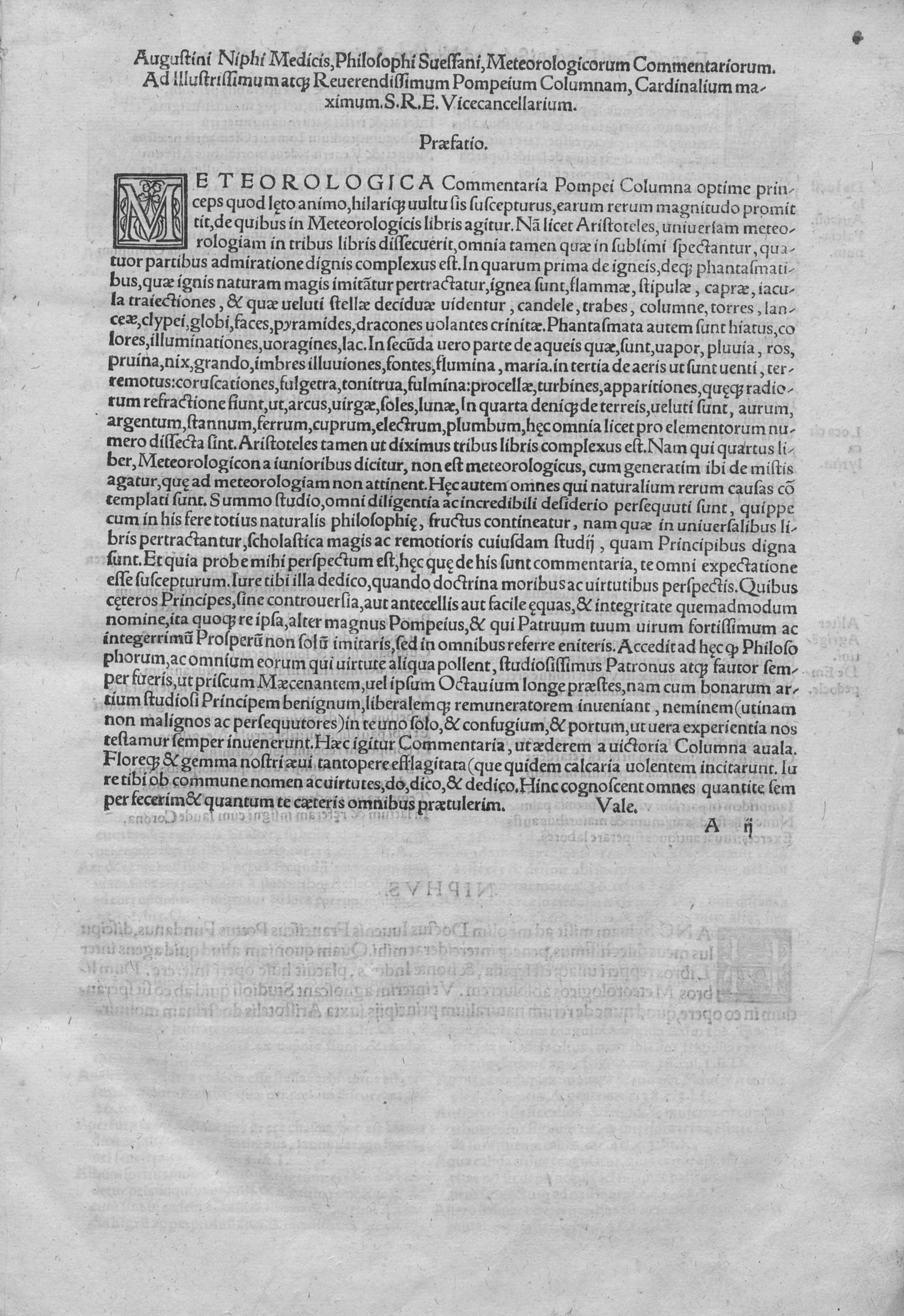
In libris Aristotelis meteorologicis commentaria, 1547

== Work ==
In his early thought he followed Averroes, but afterwards modified his views so far as to make himself acceptable to the orthodox Catholics. In 1495 he produced an edition of the works of Averroes; with a commentary compatible with his acquired orthodoxy.

In the great controversy with the Alexandrists he opposed the theory of Pietro Pomponazzi, that the rational soul is inseparably bound up with the material part of the individual, and hence that the death of the body carries with it the death of the soul. He insisted that the individual soul, as part of absolute intellect, is indestructible, and on the death of the body is merged in the eternal unity.

== Writings ==
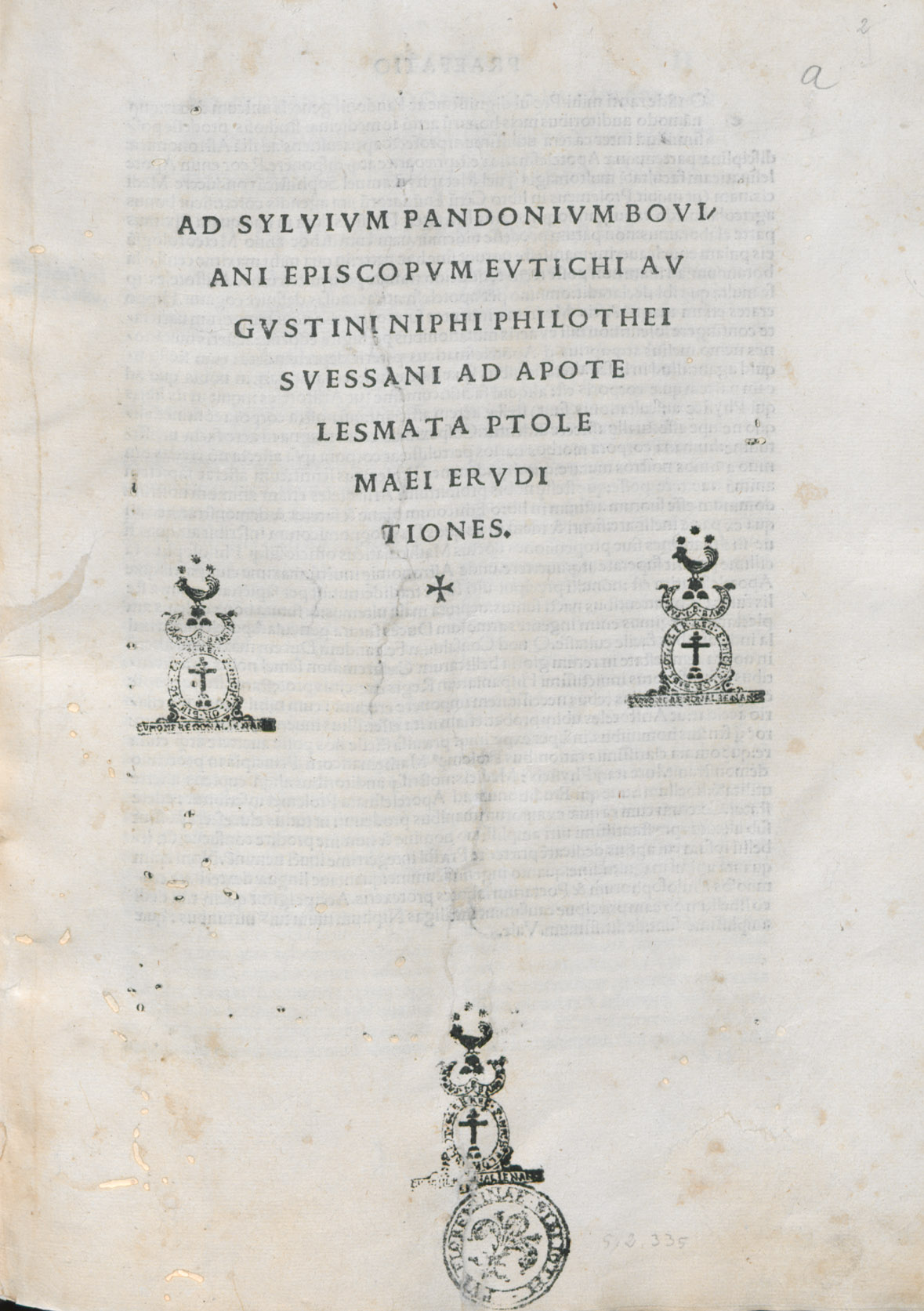
Ad Apotelesmata Ptolemaei eruditiones, 1513

His principal philosophical works are:

- Liber de intellectu (1503).
- Ad Apotelesmata Ptolemaei eruditiones (in Latin). Napoli: Pietro Maria De Richis. 1513.
- De immortalitate animae libellus (1518).
- De falsa diluvii prognosticatione (in Latin). Firenze: eredi Filippo Giunta (1.). 1520.
- Dialectica ludicra (1521).
- De regnandi peritia (1523).
- Quaestio de infinitate primi motoris (1526, written in 1504).
- Prima pars opusculorum (1535) reprinted by Gabriel Naudè with the title Opuscula moralia et politica (1645).

His numerous commentaries on Aristotle were widely read and frequently reprinted, the best-known edition being one printed at Paris in 1645 in fourteen volumes (including the Opuscula).

- In libris Aristotelis meteorologicis commentaria (in Latin). Venezia: Ottaviano Scoto (2.). 1547.

Other works were De Auguriis (Bologna, 1531), De Pulchro Liber Primus, De Amore Liber Secundus (Lyon, 1549), and a commentary on Ptolemy.

The famous phrase, to 'think with the learned, and speak with the vulgar' is attributed to Nifo.

=== English translations ===
- Leen Spruit (ed.), Agostino Nifo: De intellectu, Leiden: Brill, 2011 (Brill's Studies in Intellectual History).
- On the False Prognostication of the Flood - A complete (albeit AI-assisted) English translation of De falsa diluvii prognosticatione.

== See also ==
- Nicoletto Vernia, his teacher
- Gian Giacomo Adria, a pupil
