= Oklahoma Ethics Commission =

Agency overview
- Formed: September 18, 1990
- Preceding agency: Oklahoma Council on Campaign Compliance and Ethical Standards
- Headquarters: 2300 N Lincoln Boulevard; Oklahoma City, Oklahoma
- Employees: 4 classified 3 unclassified
- Annual budget: $750,000
- Minister responsible: Michael Rogers, Secretary of State
- Agency executive: Lee Slater, Executive Director
- Website: www.ok.gov/oec

The Oklahoma Ethics Commission is an agency of the state of Oklahoma that issues rules on the ethical conduct for state elected officials and employees. It also investigates and prosecutes violations of its rules. The Ethics Commission was created by a two-to-one vote of the people of the state per an initiative effort adding Article XXIX to the Oklahoma Constitution. The statewide vote on the amendment (State Question No. 627) was held September 18, 1990. The commission was created in 1990 during the term of Governor Henry Bellmon. Commissioners were sworn in and began meeting in July 1991.

The commission is composed of five members, with one each appointed by the Governor of Oklahoma, President pro tempore of the Oklahoma Senate, Speaker of the Oklahoma House of Representatives, the Chief Justice of the Oklahoma Supreme Court, and the Attorney General of Oklahoma. All members serve five year terms.

== Commissioners ==
The commission is composed of five appointed members. One each is appointed by the Governor, President Pro Tempore of the Senate, Speaker of the House, Chief Justice of the Supreme Court and Attorney General. No more than three can be of the same political party. No more than one congressional district may be represented at a time. All members serve five year terms.

As of 2019, the current Commissioners are:

- Jarred Brejcha - appointed by Speaker of the Oklahoma House of Representatives Charles McCall in 2019, represents Oklahoma's 1st congressional district, Independent, term expires July 2024.
- Gregg Engle - appointed President pro tempore of the Oklahoma Senate Greg Treat (R-Oklahoma City) in 2019, represents Oklahoma's 2nd congressional district, Republican, term expires July 2024.
- Cathy Stocker - appointed by Attorney General of Oklahoma Scott Pruitt in 2012, reappointed by Attorney General of Oklahoma Mike Hunter in 2017, represents Oklahoma's 3rd congressional district, Republican, term expires in July 2022.
- Howard Johnson - appointed by the Chief Justice Richar Darby of the Oklahoma Supreme Court in 2021, represents Oklahoma's 4th congressional district, Democrat, term expires July 2026.
- Charlie Laster - appointed by Governor of Oklahoma Mary Fallin in 2017, represents Oklahoma's 5th congressional district, Democrat, term expires July 2022

== Jurisdiction ==
The Commission serves as the official repository of the financial disclosure statements, campaign contributions and expenditure reports and lobbyist registrations and reports and has the power to issue advisory opinions when requested.

The primary duty of the commission is to issue rules on ethical behavior. Such rules are presented to the Governor of Oklahoma and both houses of the Oklahoma Legislature for review. If not disapproved by joint resolution, subject to veto by the Governor, the rules become effective. In the event the Governor vetoes a joint resolution disapproving the rules, the procedure is the same as for veto of any other bill or joint resolution. Once in effect, the rules may be repealed or modified by the commission, subject to the same legislative and gubernatorial action as for newly promulgated rules. Alternatively, the rules may also be repealed or modified by the Legislature under the same procedures.

== Major cases ==
In September 2025, the commission ordered the Oklahoma Gamefowl Commission to "pay $10,000 and dissolve following a settlement with the Ethics Commission for violating state rules governing contributions."

== See also ==
- Ethics Commission
- Florida Commission on Ethics
- Nevada Commission on Ethics
- New Mexico State Ethics Commission
- Pennsylvania State Ethics Commission
- Texas Ethics Commission
- Wisconsin Ethics Commission
