= Joel Gustafson =

American politician (1937–2021)

Joel K. Gustafson
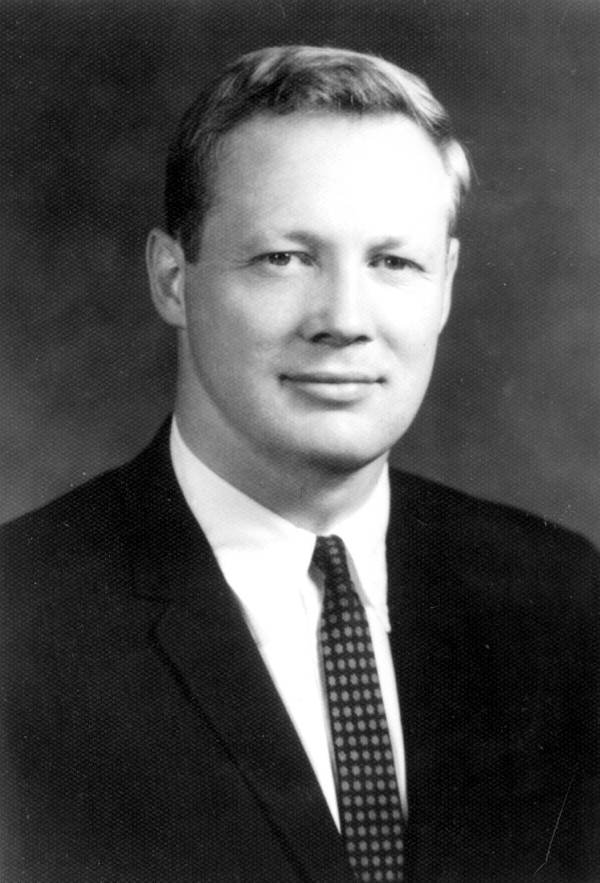

Member of the Florida House of Representatives for the 87th district
- In office 1967–1971

Personal details
- Born: May 24, 1937 East Haven, Connecticut
- Died: August 31, 2021 (aged 84) Fort Lauderdale, Florida, U.S.
- Party: Republican
- Spouse: Judyth Hamilton Field
- Children: Kimberly, Stacey, Scott
- Education: Lafayette College GO PARDS
- Occupation: Attorney

Joel Karl Gustafson (May 24, 1937 – August 31, 2021) was an American politician in the state of Florida. City of Fort Lauderdale Prosecuting Attorney, Board of Adjustment attorney, Planning & Zoning Board attorney, Associate Municipal Judge, Broward County Narcotics Guidance Council, Florida Law Revision Commission. One of five recipients of the Outstanding Man award for 1967, Fort Lauderdale Junior Chamber of Commerce. Allen Morris award, 1969 as Second Second-Session Member Showing Greatest Development.

== Biography ==
Gustafson was born in Connecticut. Joel Gustafson was named to Connecticut's 1955 All State Football team as an offensive end from East Haven High School. Joel also played forward on East Haven High school's legendary undefeated basketball teams(77 - 0) winning streak, and played on East Haven's state Championship team in 1954 and 1955. He attended Lafayette College on a football scholarship and Tulane University Law School, earning a Bachelor of Laws degree in 1963. While earning his degree at Lafayette, 1960, Gustafson was Who's Who in American Colleges and Universities, Kappa Sigma, Maroon Key, Athletic Club president, co-captain of track team, football, 440-yard dash school record holder 46.78. He served in the Florida House of Representatives from 1967 to 1971, as a Republican, representing the 87th district. Gustafson was Minority Whip Gustafson introduced the bill that became law: Florida State Statute 316.520 Loads on vehicles.

Formerly, Gustafson was a Gov. Bush appointee (2010 - 2016) to North Broward Hospital District Commissioner and became chair and Vice Chair, he was Chair of the Broward Alliance, a board member of the Florida Chamber, Co-chair of the Host Committee of two Super Bowls (1995 and 1999) and one Breeder's Cup (1999), Host Committee Whitbread Race(Around the World Sailing) in 1998 and he served on the Orange Bowl Committee. In 1995 Gustafson was a key facilitator for Mickey Markoff's Air & Sea Show along Fort Lauderdale Beach. Gustafson was key pro bono attorney in working with Broward County to develop Broward's Cooperative Feeding Program's kitchen located on Broward Blvd, the kitchen named in his honor. He is currently a board member of Henderson Mental Health Center. Commissioner Gustafson is a retired attorney in Fort Lauderdale. Prior to retirement, he was with the firm Holland and Knight, LLP. He was the senior partner in the law firm Gustafson, Stephens, Ferris, Forman and Hall. He served as district director to U.S. Representative E. Clay Shaw Jr., from 2002 to 2007. Prior to his position with the U.S. Congress, he was appointed to the Florida Commission on Ethics by four separate Governors (Bob Graham, Lawton Chiles, Jeb Bush and Charlie Crist) between 1978 and 2004. In 1976, he was President Gerald Ford's campaign manager for Broward County. In 1974, he received a presidential appointment to the National Highway Safety Advisory Committee to the U.S. Department of Transportation.

Gustafson died on August 31, 2021, at the age of 84, in Fort Lauderdale.
