= Oklahoma Gamefowl Commission =

Oklahoma Gamefowl Commission is a nonprofit advocacy group that promotes the interest of game fowl owners and lobbies for the decriminalization of cockfighting in Oklahoma.

== Background ==
Cockfighting has been illegal in the United States at the federal level since 2007 and in the state of Oklahoma since 2004. The blood sport was popular during the 20th century in Oklahoma, but efforts to ban it gained momentum in the 21st century with Oklahoma State Question 687 banning the sport being approved by voters in 2002. The ban was officially upheld by the Oklahoma Supreme Court in 2004.

In September 2025, The Oklahoma Gamefowl Commission PAC was ordered to "pay $10,000 and dissolve following a settlement with the Ethics Commission for violating state rules governing contributions." Their Chairman Anthony DeVore was charged with cockfighting crime.

== Structure ==
The president/chairman is Anthony DeVore. Josh Tadysh is their vice president. Both have been caught attending illegal cockfights.

Their website states that their goal "is to unify members into a single political group that will influence legislative actions and form a voting power house that will positively impact Gamefowl owner’s rights in Oklahoma and across the United States."

== Lobbying activities ==
The Oklahoma Gamefowl Commission lobbied to decreased criminal penalties for cockfighting and donates to election campaigns in Oklahoma. The organization has "donated more than $70,000 to Oklahoma lawmakers" and does not report the names of its donors. Before Jan. 1, 2023, the Commission donated "$41,250 to 34 sitting House members and nine Senators, with the single largest recipient of contributions being Sen. Lonnie Paxton" who received $2,500 and Governor Stitt, who received $2,000. More was later donated.

=== United States House of Representatives ===
Josh Brecheen, representative for Oklahoma's 2nd congressional district, confirmed his support for decriminalizing cockfighting in January 2024 after Anthony DeVore, president of the Oklahoma Gamefowl Commission, told the Kentucky Game Fowl Commission his organization had the congressman's support.

=== Oklahoma House of Representatives ===
Justin Humphrey has made several efforts to introduce cockfighting legislation that has led to the outcry from animal rights advocates and the former attorney general. Oklahoma has been called the "Cockfighting Capitol of the United States." In 2023, Humphrey introduced HB 2530, to allow county-specific elections to reduce from felonies to misdemeanors the criminal penalties related to cockfighting. He argued the bill as a criminal justice reform measure. The bill advanced out of the House Criminal Judiciary Committee on Feb. 22. HB 2530 died on April 13, 2023, for the second year in a row. In 2022, Jon Echols amended a previous bill of Humphrey's about cockfighting that was later changed to include issues of loitering. The Oklahoma Gamefowl Commission, "a pro-cockfighting political action committee," donated $1,000 to Humphrey "and he is listed on one report as receiving support from the organization when it spent $178.12 on a checkbook from First United Bank in Durant."

In 2023 Dave Rader co-authored House Bill 1792 with Mike Osburn that would lessen the penalties of cockfighting and dogfighting in Oklahoma, which sparked pushback from animal rights advocates. Also in 2023, Lonnie Paxton authored Senate Bill 1006 which died in the Senate. It would have also lessened the penalties for cockfighting in the state, similar to House Bill 2530, authored by Justin Humphrey and Paxton, which also died in the same timeframe.

On such bills Tulsa District Attorney Steve Kunzweiler said he was glad cockfighting remained a felony. In early 2024, cockfighting rings have been operating illegally in the state, with the "Oklahoma state director for Animal Wellness Action and a native of Adair County" saying that "'enforcement of state cockfighting laws has been mixed even though the cruel practice is associated with a host of other crimes, such as illegal gambling, drug trafficking, gang activity, illegal weapon sales, and violence."' In 2025, Kunzweiler claimed that cockfighting was increased by "Mexican drug cartels."

=== Oklahoma Governor interactions ===
In November 2023 Governor Kevin Stitt appeared in a prerecorded video at the Oklahoma Gamefowl Commission's annual meeting, saying: "You all know Oklahoma's long and storied history with gamefowl, from statehood to today. Oklahomans like yourselves remain dedicated to the spirit of competition and camaraderie that runs deep in our communities." The statement was criticized by former Governor Frank Keating, former attorney general Drew Edmondson, and animal rights groups as an endorsement of the commission's efforts to reduce the penalty for cockfighting in Oklahoma to a misdemeanor. A Stitt spokesperson responded: "The governor of course does not support animal cruelty. He supports Oklahoma agriculture and often records videos for ag groups around the state... [the governor] has not seen or endorsed any legislation on this topic." YouTube later took the video down for violating community standards by promoting animal cruelty. After Stitt's video message, the Gamefowl Commission asked its members to oppose the nomination of Sara E. Hill to the federal judiciary, saying, "our governor, Kevin Stitt, has asked that we call and email Senators Lankford and Mullin to rescind their approval of Ms. Sara Hill as a federal judge in Northern Oklahoma." Stitt had previously opposed Hill's nomination. The governor's office denied requesting that the commission oppose Hill's nomination. The communications director, Abegail Cave, said that the governor will not support bills that lessen cockfighting penaltities.

== Criticism ==
Wayne Pacelle, president of Animal Wellness Action, "which two decades ago worked to turn out Oklahoma voters and outlaw the activity," said that the Oklahoma Gamefowl Commission "'tried to make an official sounding name'" but that '"they’re just a bunch of cockfighters."' The president and vice president of the Oklahoma Gamefowl Commission have both been caught attending illegal cockfights. Animal Wellness Action claims that the Commission raised at least $100,000 from other cockfighters and "funneled" what they believe "were illegally acquired funds mainly to Oklahoma politicians."
