= Nevada Commission on Ethics =

American state government agency

The Nevada Commission on Ethics is a commission that investigates ethics violations by government officials or employees in the state of Nevada in the United States. It has jurisdiction over public officers and employees at the state, county, and city levels of government, as well as various other political subdivisions. The commission consists of eight members appointed for four-year terms.

== History ==
In 1975, the Nevada Legislature passed the Nevada Ethics in Government Law, creating the State Ethics Commission. The law was struck down in 1976 by the Nevada Supreme Court for being unconstitutionally vague.

The legislature passed a revised law in 1977, creating the Executive Ethics Commission and the Legislative Ethics Commission. The two commissions were dissolved in 1985 and replaced with the commission in its present form.

== Structure ==
The Nevada Commission on Ethics consists of eight appointed commissioners. Four of the commissioners are appointed by the governor and four of the commissioners are appointed by the legislature. The commission elects a chair and vice chair annually to lead the commission in its work. The selected members must:

1. Of the four members chosen by the Legislative Commission, at least two must be former public officers or employees, and at least one must be an attorney licensed to practice law in this State.
2. Of the four members chosen by the Governor of Nevada, at least two must be former public officers or employees, and at least one must be an attorney licensed to practice law in this State.
3. Not more than four members of the commission may be members of the same political party. Not more than four members of the commission may be residents of the same county.
4. None of the members of the commission may, while the member is serving on the commission:
  1. Hold another public office;
  2. Be actively involved in the work of any political party or political campaign; or
  3. Communicate directly with a State Legislator or a member of a local legislative body on behalf of someone other than himself or herself or the commission, for compensation, to influence:
    1. The State Legislator with regard to introducing or voting upon any matter or taking other legislative action; or
    2. The member of the local legislative body with regard to introducing or voting upon any ordinance or resolution, taking other legislative action, or voting upon: the appropriation of public money, the issuance of a license or permit, or any proposed subdivision of land or special exception or variance from zoning regulations.

In addition to the eight commissioners, the commission has a staff of seven including an appointed Executive Director and an appointed Commission Counsel. Other staff include administrative support, an investigator, and an outreach and education officer.

== Current Membership and Appointed Staff ==
Current Members of the Nevada Commission on Ethics:

Nevada Commission on Ethics
Position	Name	Party	Term Expires
Chair	Scott Scherer	Republican	2027
Commissioner	Michael E. Langton, Esq	Democrat	2028
Commissioner	JT Moran, III, Esq	Democrat	2028
Commissioner	John Miller	Republican	2027
Commissioner	Janet C. Pancoast, Esq.	Democrat	2030
Commissioner	Terry Reynolds	Republican	2028
Commissioner	Laena St-Jules, Esq.	Democrat	2030
Commissioner	Brianna Smith, Esq	Republican	2028

Nevada Commission on Ethics Appointed Staff
Ross E. Armstrong, Esq	Executive Director
Elizabeth J. Bassett, Esq.	Commission Counsel

== Commission opinions ==
The Nevada Commission on Ethics publishes Advisory Opinions for public officers and employees and also publishes opinions and final determinations related to ethics complaint cases. Published opinions can be found in the commission's Opinions Database.

== See also ==
- Ethics commission
- Florida Commission on Ethics
- New Mexico State Ethics Commission
- Oklahoma Ethics Commission
- Pennsylvania State Ethics Commission
- Texas Ethics Commission
- Wisconsin Ethics Commission
- United States Office of Government Ethics
- United States House Committee on Ethics
