= Florida Commission on Ethics =

Government agency in Florida

Agency overview
- Formed: 1974; 52 years ago
- Jurisdiction: Florida state and local public officials, other than judges.
- Headquarters: 325 John Knox Road, Building E, Suite 200, Tallahassee, Florida
- Motto: "A public office is a public trust"
- Annual budget: $2.7 million (2021)
- Agency executives: John Grant, Chair; Linda Stewart., Vice Chair
- Website: ethics.state.fl.us

The Florida Commission on Ethics, created in 1974 by the Florida Legislature, is tasked with investigating complaints alleging breaches of public trust by public officers and employees in Florida, other than judges. It is headquartered in Tallahassee, Florida.

== History and role ==
=== 1974-99 ===
In 1974 the Florida Legislature created the Florida Commission on Ethics "to serve as guardian of the standards of conduct" for state and local public officials. The commission is tasked with investigating complaints alleging breaches of public trust by public officers and employees in Florida, other than judges. It is part of the legislative branch of Florida government.

Professor R.L. Williams studied the effectiveness of the commission in the early 1990s, culminating in a report in 1996, and concluded that at the time it apparently served "more effectively as a punitive agent than as an agent of constructive change."

=== 1999-2020 ===
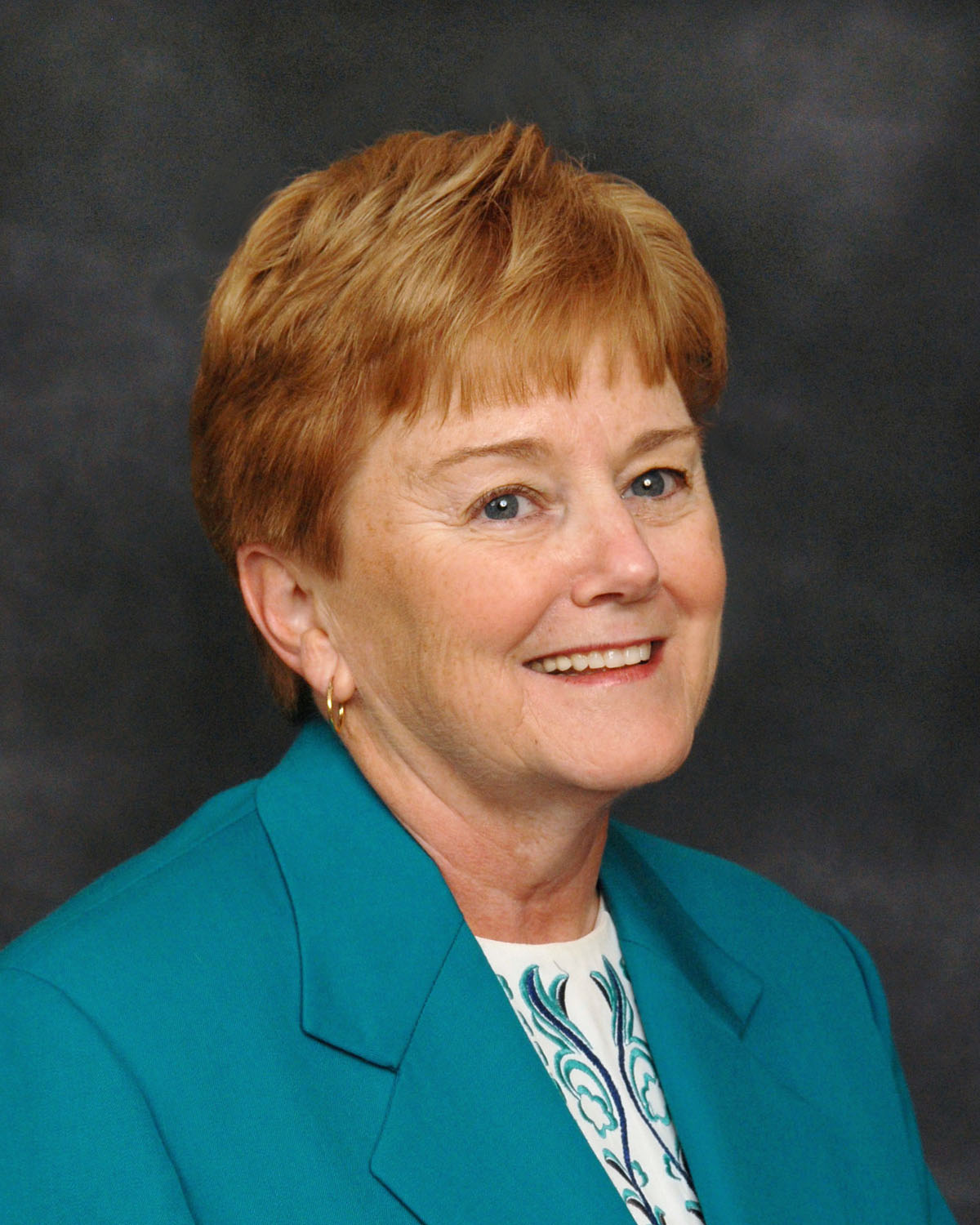
H. Marlene O'Toole

On August 24, 2000, the commission held that Leon County commissioner Bill Proctor should pay civil penalties, for violating the Full and Public Disclosure of Financial Interests sections of the Florida Constitution.

In 2004, Alachua County commissioner Cynthia Chestnut was found guilty of an ethics violation by the commission after she took free tickets to an event from a developer.

Professor Donald Menzel wrote in 2012 that the commission is often regarded as toothless, because in part it is unable to sanction violators, but rather can only make suggestions to the presiding authority.

On January 23, 2015, the commission determined that member of the Florida House of Representatives H. Marlene O'Toole failed to disclose a voting conflict when she voted on the Florida's 2013 budget. On March 11, 2015, the Florida House of Representatives held that O'Toole would not receive punishment for the nondisclosure.

In January 2019, the commission found probable cause that mayor of Tallahassee Andrew Gillum violated Florida ethics laws when he accepted gifts during out-of-town excursions with lobbyists and vendors, and failed to report them.

=== 2020–present ===
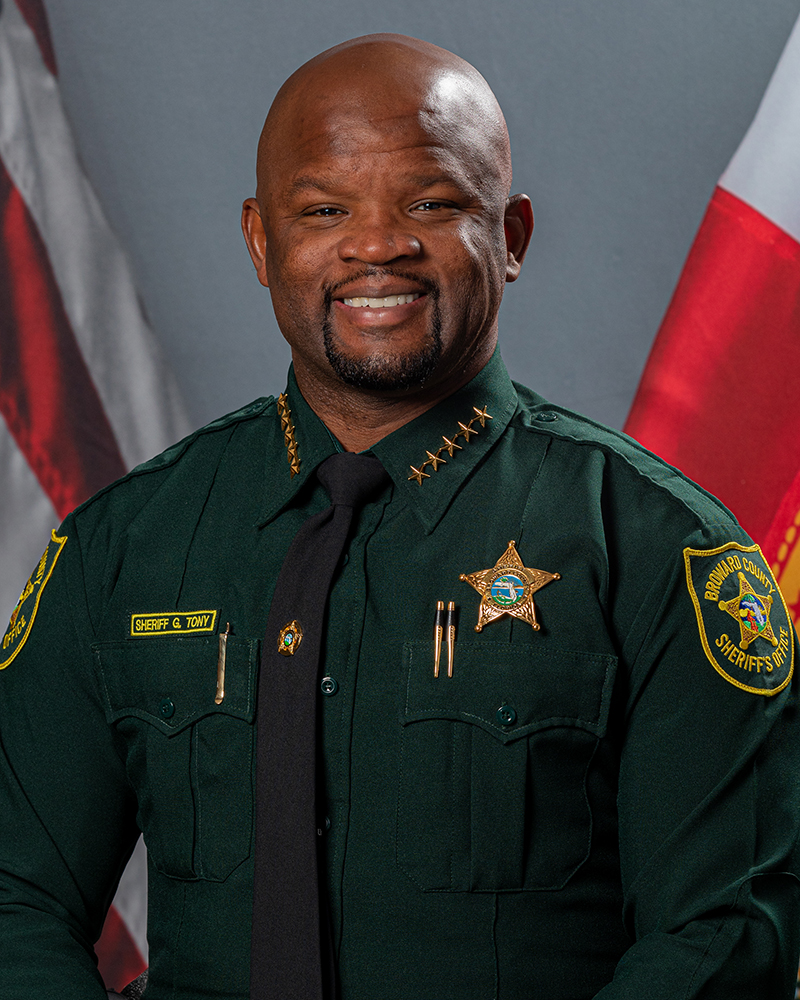
Gregory Tony

In September 2022, the commission opined that probable cause existed supporting the belief that when the sheriff of Broward County, Florida, Gregory Tony applied for positions with the Coral Springs Police Department and the Broward County Sheriff's Office, he misused his public position as he submitted false information or failed to submit information. Later that month, as a result of the commission's statement, Tony was added by Broward state prosecutors to its list of law enforcement officials who could be perceived as having credibility issues that might render their testimony in a trial less than credible. In December 2022, the commission again found probable cause in a case involving Tony.

== Code of Ethics ==
The Florida Constitution had been revised to require that a code of ethics be created by law for all state employees and non-judicial officers. The code was to prohibit conflict between public duty and private interests. The "Code of Ethics for Public Officers and Employees" was adopted by the Florida Legislature in Florida Statutes Chapter 112 (Part III). The code seeks to ensure that public officials conduct themselves independently and impartially, and seeks to protect the integrity of government.

== Commission members ==
Five of the commission's nine members are appointed by the governor of Florida, and two each are appointed by the president of the Florida Senate and the speaker of the Florida House of Representatives. No more than five commission members may be members of the same political party, and none may hold any public employment during their two-year terms of office. A chair is selected from among the members to serve a one-year term, and may not succeed himself or herself.

== Commission penalties ==
Criminal penalties which initially applied to violations of the code were eliminated in 1974, in favor of administrative enforcement; the commission does not itself impose penalties or enforce its findings.

== See also ==
- DuBose Ausley, former chairman of the commission
- Scott Clemons, former member of the commission
- Sandy D'Alemberte, former chairman of the commission
- Joel Gustafson, former member of the commission
- Nevada Commission on Ethics
- New Mexico State Ethics Commission
- Oklahoma Ethics Commission
- Pennsylvania State Ethics Commission
- Texas Ethics Commission
- Wisconsin Ethics Commission
