= Gian Giacomo Adria =

Italian physician, historian and humanist

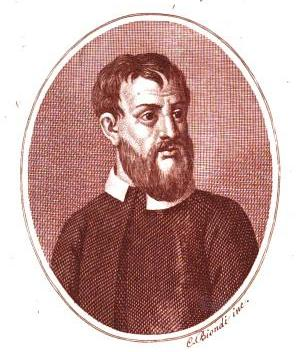
Gian Giacomo Adria

Gian Giacomo Adria or Adria Johannes Jacobus de Paulo (born in Mazara del Vallo in Sicily c. 1485 - died in Palermo in 1560) was an Italian physician, historian and humanist.

== Biography ==
He first studied in Mazara del Vallo with the humanist Tommaso Schifaldo, then moved to Palermo, where he studied rhetoric. He then went to Naples where he worked with Agostino Nifo.

On 29 June 1510, he obtained the degree of Doctor of Philosophy and Medicine in Salerno. He began to practise the medical profession in Sicily.

In 1535, he took part in the conquest of Tunis as a physician and was made an Imperial Knight by Charles V. On his return to Rome, he took care of Pope Clement VII. He was appointed Protomedicus of Sicily.

He died at the age of 75 in Palermo where he was buried in the church San Francesco d'Assisi, Palermo, where the following epitaph can be read:

Hic jacet in suo sepulcro excellens Artium, et Medicinae Doctor Johannes Jacobus Adria de Paulo Siculus et Mazariensis Miles, et Medicus Imperialis, Siciliae Protomedicus, et concivis Panormitanus anno 1560.

== Works ==
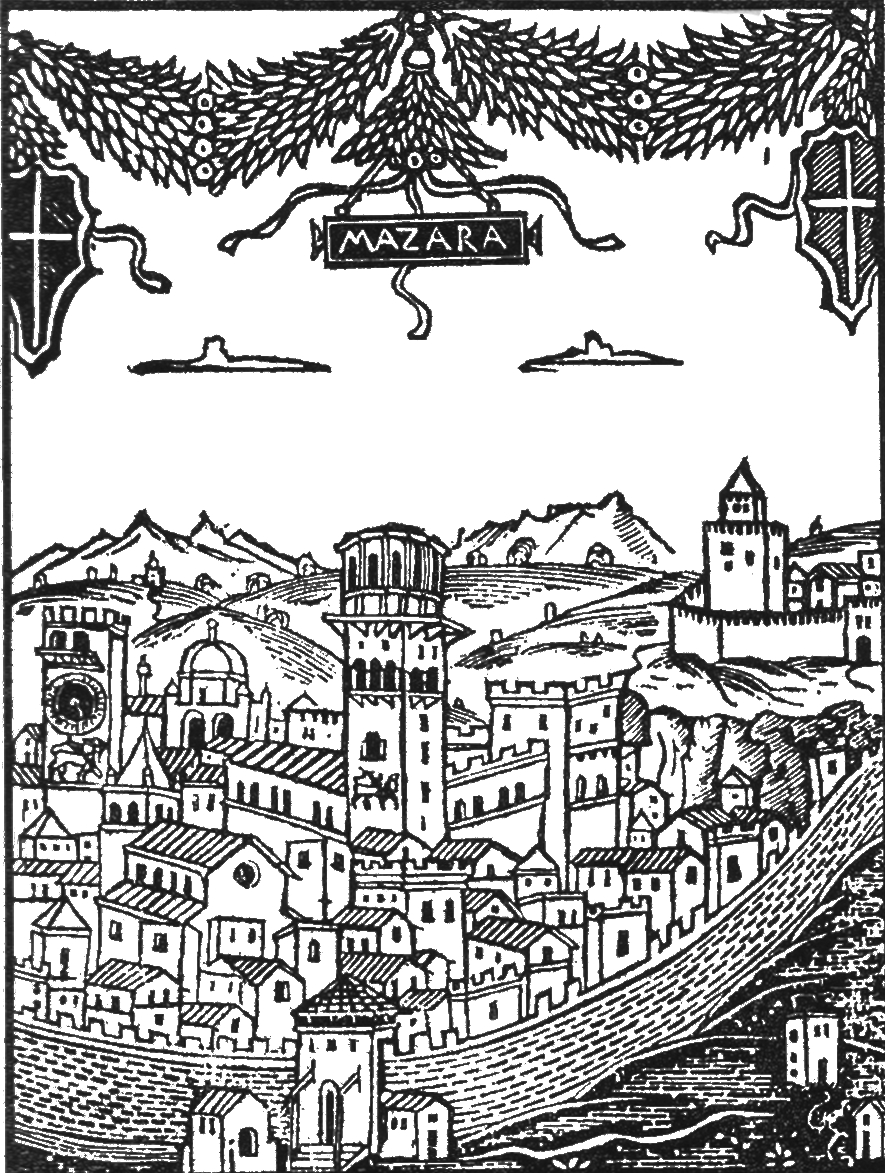
Map of Mazara

He wrote several works of a historical-scientific, literary and poetic nature.

=== Scientific works ===
- De fluminibus Selinunti et Mazaro. 1513.
- Topographiae inclitae Civitatis Mazariae. Palermo: Johan et Antonium Papam. 1515.
- De laudibus Siciliae et primo de Valle Mazariae. 1535.
- De praeservatione pestilentiae ad Antonium filium.
- De Phlebotomia ad Carolum Imperatorem.
- De Balneis sicilis ad Antonium filium.
- De Medicinis ad varios morbos hominum.
- De vita sanctorum Martyrum mazariensium.

=== Literary works ===
- De laudibus virtutis. 1515..
- Epistola ad coniugem. Palermo: Antonium de Mayda. 1516.
- Epistola versu elegiaco ad coniugem Antoniam Scherinam. 1528.
- De laudibus Christi contra haereticos. 1529.
- In libellum de laudibus Christi explanatio. 1538.
- Liber de passione Christi. 1538.
- Historia Sicula M.S.
- Legenda SS. Viti, Modesti, et Crescentiae ad Mazariensis.

=== Manuscripts ===
The following manuscripts are kept in the Municipal Library of Palermo :

- De situ vallis Mazariae ad Hectorem Pignatelli Proregem.
- Litoralia Siciliae de Peloro ad Lylibaeum.
