= History of Early Analytic Philosophy Society =

The History of Early Analytic Philosophy Society (HEAPS) is a philosophical society founded to study early analytic philosophy. The society examines the work of Gottlob Frege, Bertrand Russell, Ludwig Wittgenstein, Frank P. Ramsey, G. E. Moore, and other early contributors to the field. The Society sponsors conference sessions in conjunction with the American Philosophical Association.
