= Melbourne School of Continental Philosophy =

MSCP Poster outlining the various activities of the organisation. MSCP Website

The Melbourne School of Continental Philosophy (MSCP) is an institution dedicated to scholarly, extensive and engaged readings of key figures and texts in the history of modern European thought and contemporary discourse. The School was founded in 2003 and formalised its status as an independent, not-for-profit organisation in 2004. It is based in Melbourne, Australia and is housed by The University of Melbourne.

== Formation and early years ==
In January 2002, Cameron Shingleton, Jon Roffe, Matt Sharpe and David Rathbone ran a summer school with four courses (on Nietzsche, on Deleuze, on Zizek and on Hegel, respectively) in the 1888 Building at the University of Melbourne. Sharpe had just finished his PhD on Zizek with Marion Tapper and John Rundell at Melbourne; Rathbone had returned to Melbourne from studies with Agnes Heller and Reiner Schurmann at the New School for Social Research in New York; Shingleton had completed his honours degree on Nietzsche in the German department; and Roffe his, in French. All four were of the opinion that the formalities of institutional academia alone were not sufficient to undertaking philosophical and critical thought. They thus formed the MSCP in the spirit of a guild of philosophers with the intention of preserving and fostering genuine intellectual engagement with continental philosophy. In 2003, they were joined by Sean Ryan, Craig Barrie, and Ashley Woodward, and later, Esther Anatolitis, Felicity Joseph, Jack Reynolds, Kate Noble, Alex Murray, Atliana Safich, Mark Tomlinson, Marc Hiatt, James Garrett, Bryan Cooke, Paul Daniels, Andrea Leon-Martino, and Sherah Bloor, all of whom have all been involved in various ways during the five years 2004–2009, running annual Summer and Winter Schools, as well as several conferences and research days.

== Events and activities ==
=== Summer and Winter Schools ===
The MSCP runs Summer and Winter Schools at the University of Melbourne during the university vacation breaks. Courses in the Schools consist of five two-hour lectures over a week and do not involve assessment or require any demonstrated prior knowledge of the topic in question. As the MSCP is a not-for-profit organisation, registration costs are minimal.

MSCP courses seek a detailed and scholarly encounter with philosophical thinkers and themes. In particular, the courses attempt to promote constructive ways of engaging with philosophy which are not widely represented in contemporary academic discourse. The courses aim to locate philosophy in the context of its historical and cultural milieu, encouraging lively, academic debate, emphasising the interdisciplinary aspects of philosophy. Classes are informal but strive to be rigorous and faithful to the philosophers and texts being studied.

Past courses have covered philosophers such as Hegel, Nietzsche, Heidegger, Wittgenstein, Lyotard, Derrida, Deleuze and Badiou. A series of courses has run over several Summer and Winter Schools entitled 'MSCP History of Philosophy Series' which assessed philosophy from the pre-Socratics to modern empiricism. Similar courses, treating a theme rather than a particular philosopher or text, have included 'Three Centuries of Aphorism' and 'Democracy, Elites and Violence'.

=== Conferences ===
The MSCP has run conferences including:

- 2002 Australasian Society of Continental Philosophy conference at the University of Melbourne (the MSCP hosted this conference in conjunction with the Department of Philosophy at the University of Melbourne), held in December 2002
- 'Immanuel Kant Today', commemorating the 200th anniversary of the death of Immanuel Kant, held in February 2004
- 'Sensorium', a conference on philosophy and aesthetics, held in June 2005
- 'Sartre Colloquium' which included a performance of Huis Clos (held in conjunction with the Department of French, Italian and Spanish Studies and the Department of Philosophy), held in October 2005
- '200 Years of Hegel's Phenomenology of Spirit', held in July 2007

=== Research days ===
The MSCP has initiated a series of research days where philosophers in a particular field converge on a specific topic and workshop their papers together. So far, "Spinoza and the Infinite", convened by Jon Roffe was held in December 2005 and was attended by Justin Clemens, Simon Duffy, Minna Koivuniemi and Jon Roffe.

Parrhesia An International Journal of Critical Philosophy. Parrhesia Journal

=== Parrhesia Journal ===
Parrhesia: A Journal of Critical Philosophy is an international journal of Critical Philosophy affiliated with MSCP. It is edited by four MSCP members: Alex Murray, Matthew Sharpe, Jon Roffe and Ashley Woodward. It was launched in 2006 and has included articles by Alain Badiou and Jacques Rancière.

== The MSCP and the University of Melbourne ==
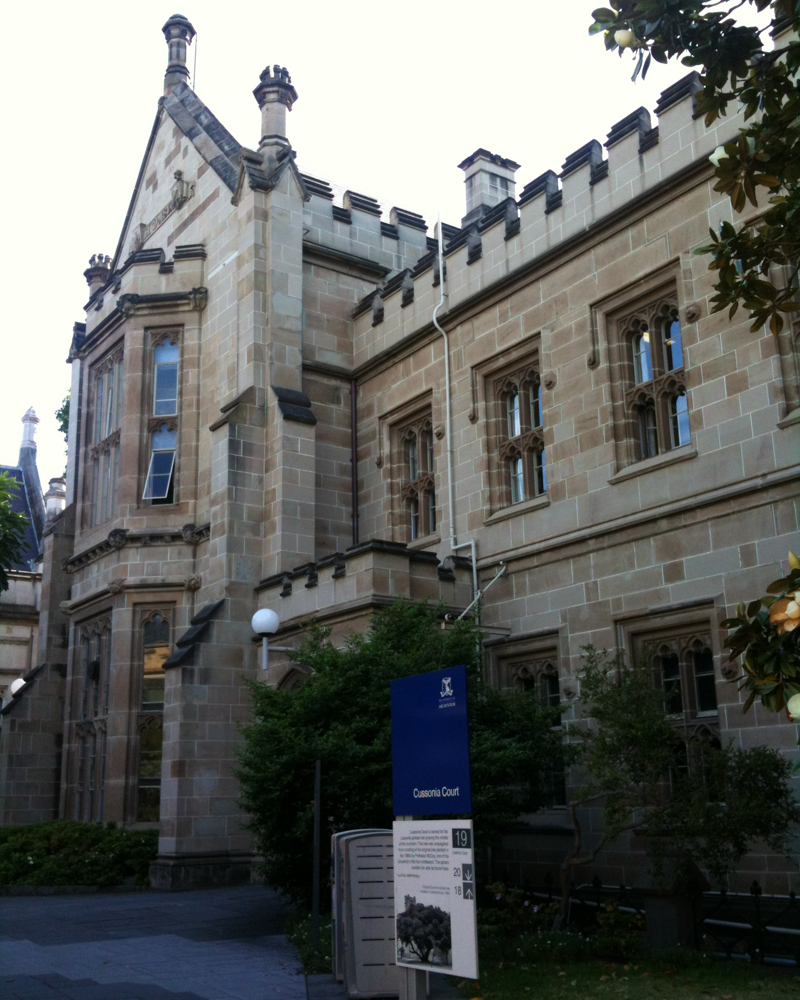
The Old Law Quadrangle at the University of Melbourne, home to the School of Philosophy. The MSCP office is located in this building.

During 2004, the founding Convenor, Jon Roffe, negotiated an informal relationship between the MSCP and the Philosophy Department with Chris Cordner (then Head of the Philosophy Department). This allowed the MSCP to undertake its activities using an office in the Department and University of Melbourne resources and teaching spaces. Late 2004, the MSCP invited Dr Marion Tapper of the University of Melbourne Philosophy Department to become a member. This merely formalised her involvement as she had always been supportive of the MSCP both philosophically and on account of knowing all of its members personally from teaching and supervision.

One way in which the MSCP attempts to transcend its university boundaries is by seeking new ways to teach and engage with philosophy. In particular, MSCP events strive to be both informal and rigorous. With their courses offering no credit or assessment, students who attend are usually there for the joy of philosophy and seek to further their own intellects outside of a formal classroom setting. Being a not-for-profit organisation, the MSCP charges a minimum for its courses; again, this is aimed at transcending the current economic climate of university funding.

== Membership ==
New members are typically recommended by current members and, largely because the organisation was founded by postgraduate students, they are usually honours year or postgraduate students themselves.
