= Pennsylvania State Ethics Commission =

- Seal of the State Ethics Commission

Agency overview
- Formed: 1979
- Jurisdiction: State government of Pennsylvania
- Agency executives: Robert P. Caruso, Executive Director; Brian D. Jacisin, Deputy Executive Director/Director of Investigations; Robin M. Hittie, Chief Counsel

The Pennsylvania State Ethics Commission is the main ethics commission for the Government of the U.S. state of Pennsylvania.

== The Commissioners ==
The five Commissioners, with two vacancies, are:

- Nicholas A. Colafella, Chairman
- Mark R. Corrigan, Vice Chairman
- Roger E. Nick, Commissioner
- Melanie F. Depalma, Commissioner
- Vacant
- Michael A. Schwartz, Commissioner
- Shelley Y. Simms, Commissioner

== See also ==
- List of Pennsylvania state agencies
- Florida Commission on Ethics
- Nevada Commission on Ethics
- New Mexico State Ethics Commission
- Oklahoma Ethics Commission
- Texas Ethics Commission
- Wisconsin Ethics Commission
