= Texas Ethics Commission =

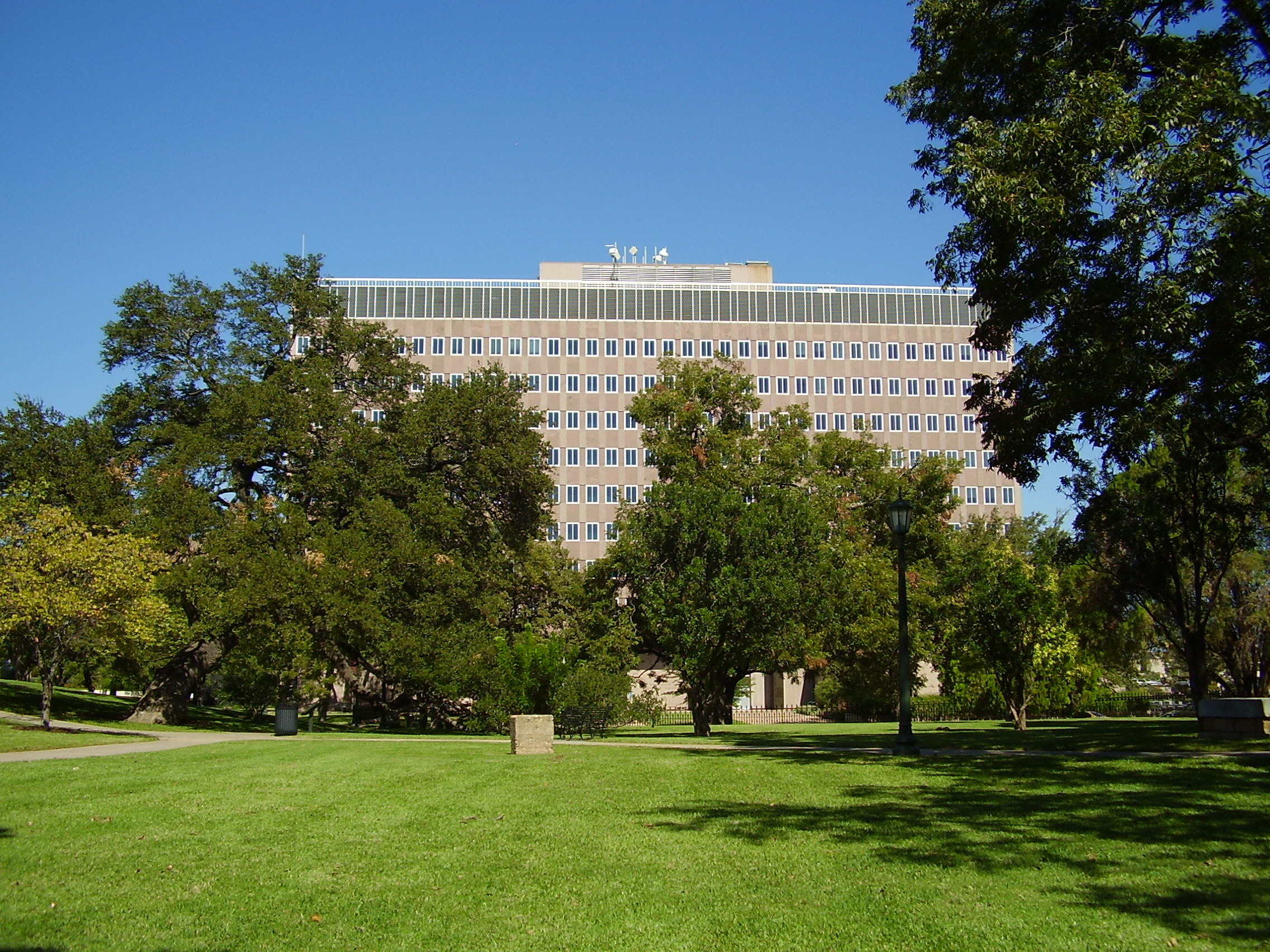
The Sam Houston State Office Building houses the Texas Ethics Commission's offices

The Texas Ethics Commission was established in 1991 to oversee and provide guidance on various public ethics laws within the state of Texas. The agency's main office is located on the 10th Floor of the Sam Houston State Office Building at 201 East 14th Street in Downtown Austin.

Instituted through a state constitutional amendment, the Commission was approved by Texas voters on November 5, 1991, as per Article III, Section 24a. It subsequently took over the responsibilities previously held by the Texas Ethics Advisory Commission.

The Commission comprises eight members, with sitting legislators prohibited from joining. Appointments are divided with the Governor selecting four, the Lt. Governor two, and the Speaker of the House the remaining two. These appointments come equally from nominations provided by both Republican and Democratic members of the Texas Legislature. In addition to other duties, the Commission recommends the salaries and daily allowances for members of the Texas Legislature, the Lieutenant Governor, and the Speaker of the Texas House of Representatives.

The Texas Legislature has further entrusted the Commission with various other duties. This includes managing the filing of financial disclosure statements by government officials and overseeing the submission of campaign finance regulatory statements by candidates and those engaging in campaign-related political speech.

== Commissioners ==
The Texas Ethics Commission is an influential body established in 1991 that provides "guidance on various public ethics laws" and plays a significant role in Texas state politics. The commission is responsible for overseeing campaign finance reports, establishing lawmakers’ pay, among other duties. The appointment breakdown is as follows: four by the Governor, two by the Lieutenant Governor, and two by the Speaker of the Texas House of Representatives. Legislators cannot be selected for service. Representatives from both major political parties in the Texas Senate and House present nominee lists to the appropriate state officials for appointment. Each commissioner is appointed to serve a four-year term.

Name	Position	Party affiliation	Appointed By	Additional information
Randall H. Erben	Vice Chairman	Republican	Joe Straus	Lobbyist with a maximum lobby income of $2,800,000 in 2009 and held 31 contracts. Also listed as a Big Pharma lobbyist.
Chris Flood	Commissioner	Democrat	Dan Patrick	
Mary K. Kennedy	Chairwoman	Democrat	Greg Abbott	
Patrick W. Mizell	Commissioner	Republican	Greg Abbott	
Richard S. Schmidt	Commissioner	Republican	Greg Abbott	
Joseph O. Slovacek	Commissioner	Republican	Dan Patrick	
Steven D. Wolens	Commissioner	Democrat	Joe Straus	

== Controversies ==
Numerous candidates and officeholders have faced fines levied by the Texas Ethics Commission (TEC).Ron Reynolds, a state representative, was fined over $75,000 for failing to file mandatory campaign finance reports during a two year period. As of March 2026, 726 individuals, including district attorneys and judges, have unpaid fines. The Texas Ethics Commission relies on the Office of the Attorney General to enforce its penalties, and Attorney General Ken Paxton has declined to do so since 2020, resulting in over $800,000 of unpaid fines.

In the early 1970s, the Sharpstown scandal led to far-reaching reforms after artificial stock inflation involving high-level government officials was discovered.

During a 2016 Senate Committee on State Affairs hearing, concerns were raised regarding the perceived "arrogance" and "haughtiness" of the Texas Ethics Commission.

There have also been claims of racial bias within the TEC.

Victims of the TEC, such as nonprofits, faced challenges with TEC's imposed regulations that threatened to curtail their political speech rights, leading to lengthy legal battles and significant financial burdens.

The Commission has also faced accusations of providing misleading financial statements, including a quote of over $300,000 to pass a measure that would allow filers to correct their own paperwork errors, reducing the TEC's workload in the process. This quote was later reversed after backlash.

In 2012, the Sunset Advisory Commission, a legislative advisory board, found that the TEC was too focused on trivial violations and used outdated technology and 'antiquated' filing methods.

TEC's methods, such as allegedly imposing unconstitutional liens on properties without appropriate notification, have been a source of concern. The Commission's decision to conduct secret proceedings regarding alleged election law violations by Michael Quinn Sullivan in 2012 drew significant public criticism.

=== Financial Mismanagement ===
The Texas Ethics Commission (TEC) faces serious allegations of mismanagement, with critics highlighting an alarming $2,008,793.28 spent on salaries and $958,426.19 on repairs and maintenance in the fiscal year 2023, raising concerns about overstaffing and resource mismanagement. Negative adjustments in the capital asset fund, alongside losses in other revenues and professional fees & services, totaling $1,938.30 and $105,185.85 respectively, further point to financial inefficiencies and potential misallocations of funds. With over $3.6 million received in legislative appropriations, the financial discrepancies and heavy reliance on government funding question TEC’s independence and ability to uphold ethical standards, underscoring the need for a comprehensive financial overhaul.

=== Kangaroo Court ===
Numerous public complaints have arisen challenging the TEC on grounds of transparency and fairness in its procedures. Victims have gone on record stating that the actions undertaken by the TEC mirror those reminiscent of a "kangaroo court." Such criticisms come in light of incidents like closed-door hearings based on questionable accusations and protracted legal affairs that seemed to lack substantial evidence. Furthermore, the TEC's credibility came under scrutiny when it was revealed that Commission staff had privately advised a major participant to forgo attending a particular hearing.

One notable case has drawn attention to the TEC's potentially unfair practices, wherein a victim of the commission was scheduled for a hearing during a time of professional preoccupation and another during a time of a personal loss, specifically the passing of a close family member. Despite the gravity of these circumstances, the TEC did not offer to reschedule either hearing or provide any concessions. The affected individual later expressed that they felt denied the opportunity to present their case, describing the situation as feeling more like a scripted play than a genuine hearing.

Moreover, there were instances where the TEC seemed to dismiss substantial evidence provided by the individuals under scrutiny. Despite having a plethora of evidence and corroborative statements backing their claims, the commission's conclusions seemed to diverge from the presented realities. Such behavior further deepened the mistrust toward the TEC and raised concerns about its commitment to upholding the highest ethical standards.

In 2015, the TEC's alleged irregularities in administering campaign finance regulations garnered considerable attention. A prominent example includes the decision of the TEC to fine the Texas Home School Coalition (THSC) $1,900 due to a self-disclosed reporting oversight. In stark contrast, during the same timeframe, the Commission drastically reduced a fine for a Democratic State Representative who had overlooked a filing deadline for a significant duration, cutting down a $10,000 penalty to a paltry $1,000. Such decisions, in conjunction with earlier contentious verdicts, portray the TEC as potentially wielding its mandate in a manner open to interpretation and potential bias.

=== Examples of Campaign Fines ===
The Texas Ethics Commission (TEC) faces criticism for its rigorous and sometimes arbitrary fine imposition for campaign finance violations. An Arlington School Board candidate was fined $300 in September 2023 due to discrepancies in their campaign finance reports and absence of a designated campaign treasurer. Although the candidate quickly corrected these issues and updated their filings, the TEC maintained the fine, sparking concerns about the transparency and fairness in their decision-making, possibly indicating a trend of inconsistent rulings.

The TEC's inconsistency is also seen in a case involving a former Mayor of Brownsville, who received a $100 fine for failing to properly file a campaign treasurer appointment while accepting contributions and incurring expenses. Even after promptly rectifying the error without having received any political contributions, the Mayor still faced a fine, further questioning the TEC's practices.

In San Antonio, a police union treasurer was fined $5,000 for violating state election codes. Critics labeled the fine excessive, pointing out that the treasurer claimed the disclosure violations were accidental, resulting from a complicated filing system.

Furthermore, the Agua Special Utility District's Board President was fined $500 for not submitting a personal financial statement. The TEC's aggressive approach, involving multiple warning letters and threats of additional penalties, raises concerns about the fairness and proportionality in their rulings.

A local political consultant from Flower Mound faced a total of $37,500 in fines for a series of alleged violations, distributed across three different instances of misconduct. Critics claim these steep fines highlight the TEC's tendency towards harsh punitive measures, questioning the fairness and real intentions behind their enforcement actions.

The TEC's inability to collect substantial fines, as seen in a Dallas County judge's case with over $42,000 in unpaid fines, and the Attorney General's refusal to represent them in a legal matter, reflect a growing skepticism and lack of confidence in the TEC’s practices. These issues underline the urgent need for a thorough evaluation of the commission's operations.

== See also ==
- Florida Commission on Ethics
- Nevada Commission on Ethics
- New Mexico State Ethics Commission
- Oklahoma Ethics Commission
- Pennsylvania State Ethics Commission
- Wisconsin Ethics Commission
