= Academia Analitica =

- Abbreviation: Acad. Anal.
- Formation: 2007
- Headquarters: Sarajevo, Bosnia and Herzegovina
- President: Nijaz Ibrulj
- Website: https://academiaanalitica.wordpress.com/

Academia Analitica is a learned society for the development of logic and analytic philosophy based in Bosnia and Herzegovina. It was founded in 2007 at the Faculty of Philosophy of the University of Sarajevo. The society's founder and president is Nijaz Ibrulj (University of Sarajevo). The members of Academia Analitica take interest in analytic philosophy and research in the fields of logic, philosophy of language, philosophy of science, mathematics, computer science, and other analytic and deductive sciences.

The society also takes part in several long-term projects, such as creating a chrestomathy of texts dealing with philosophical logic and establishing a journal called The Logical Foresight.
