= The Philosophy of Eating =

1867 American nutritionist book

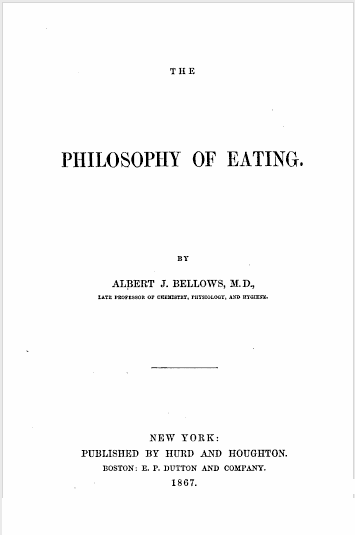
- First edition
- Author: Albert J. Bellows
- Language: English
- Published: 1867 (Hurd and Houghton)
- Publication place: United States
- Pages: 342

The Philosophy of Eating is a book on nutrition by American homeopathic physician Albert J. Bellows (1804-1869). The book was first published in 1867 with the posthumous edition descriptor line Late Professor of Chemistry, Physiology, and Hygiene, and reprinted in later years to the current Philosophy of Eating. Entered, according to Act of Congress, in the year 1867, by Bellows, in the Clerk's Office of the District Court of the District Massachusetts stereotyped at the Boston Stereotype Foundry.

The core of these points of view is to attach a mental state of mind with the sources of proper agricultural food sources in a balance of harmony in part because the sources have freshness and purity. Modern assertions are that the fresh foods contain vital micronutrients generally lost in most food processing.

Additional issues are brought to light in modern times where advertising along with subtle cues in color or related sensory inputs are masking substandard or even toxic ingredients present. The masquerade of dyes and organic chemicals from non-food sources become key in the current vernacular of various publications and nutrition movements.

== Overview ==
Bellow's The Philosophy of Eating discusses the principles of nutrition, major food groups and role of diet in health and disease for the lay audience. The book was very popular and went through sixteen editions in America from its first issue at New York in 1867 to the 16th Boston edition in 1887.

An introductory section by Bellows dedicates this edition to "The Five Thousand Ladies" who attended his lectures from 1838 to 1858.

In the preface, Bellows states that we have excellent practical treatises on Agriculture and Horticulture, and every intelligent farmer or gardener may learn what element is deficient, in order to cultivate his grapes, his vegetables, or his grains; and having also chemical analyses of these fruits and grains, and of the materials from which to obtain his deficient elements, he has the means of adapting his soil to all desirable productions.

A follow on work to this book How Not to Be Sick guided the reader into a deeper set of specifics started with this original work. The book attributes all diseases to improper eating.

As a book The Philosophy of Eating was authored by Albert J. Bellows (1804-1869) in the late 1860s. The author portrayed the concepts in light of science as well as views drawn from religiosity common in the mid to late 1860s era. So with a biblical fervor as an original direction of inspiration the author then supplies a variety of what was then scientific knowledge to correctly apply that in agriculture to the table in the kitchen. Fresh fruits and grains as those so ordained in the work making up a core of inputs to the meats of the day looked upon in detail most up to that time obtained from the local butcher.

More recent incarnations derived from this are exhibited in raw foodism for people. This manifestation seen in a variety of areas including vegan food preparation and offshoots related. Contemporary revisiting of this in a new updated book continuing is a more secular scientific work by George Davey who published a 2013 book called The Philosophy of Eating Break the Trance. With more up to date scientific analysis than the treatise from Bellows the author describes how mechanisms of discovery, chemical masks and the driving forces beyond that of the earlier works in the topic.

== Experiences ==
Philosophy extends from the scientific observation to how we as people treat our animals versus ourselves in dietary habits from youth through to adulthood.

Reviving the lost art of nourishing ourselves blogged about in part to illustrate this as a proper approach.

Though cited in The Philosophy of Eating Break the Trance, health philosophy of eating like our paleolithic ancestors is found in a variety directions including mineral intake.

== Contrast ==
Processed foods get celebration along with trepidation in newer periodicals in 2013. Scientific American and Wired devote entire issues to food content and philosophy of nutrition.

Particularly, the scientific basis is now better understood and psychological remediation or behavior patterns are more amenable to that of a reader in modern times contrasted with processed food celebration by. The continued strength of industrialized food troubles some people though.

== About the author ==
Albert Jones Bellows was born at Groton on July 28, 1804. He graduated from Harvard Medical School in 1829, became a homeopathic physician and authored books on dietetics. He practised medicine in Salem, Charlestown, and Roxbury. Bellows died at Boston on December 18, 1869.
