= Wisconsin Ethics Commission =

Wisconsin state commission charged with administering and enforcing ethics laws

Agency overview
- Formed: June 30, 2016; 10 years ago
- Preceding agencies: Wisconsin Government Accountability Board (2008–2016); Wisconsin Ethics Board (1973–2008)
- Headquarters: 101 E. Wilson St. Madison, Wisconsin, U.S. 43°4′23.88″N 89°22′46.452″W
- Employees: 8 (2023)
- Annual budget: $3,017,000 (2023)
- Agency executives: Maryann Sumi, Chair; Andrew Weininger, Vice Chair; Daniel A. Carlton Jr., Administrator
- Website: ethics.wi.gov

The Wisconsin Ethics Commission is a regulatory agency of the State of Wisconsin which administers and enforces Wisconsin law pertaining to ethics and lobbying.

== Membership ==
The Commission is made up of six members, two of whom are appointed by the Governor of Wisconsin, and one each by the President of the Senate, the Senate Majority Leader, the Speaker of the Assembly, and the Assembly Minority Leader.

The staff of the Commission are non-partisan, and are led by an administrator. The administrator is appointed by the commission and must be confirmed by the Wisconsin Senate.

== Current commissioners ==
Name	Role	Hometown	Appointed by	Term expires	Party
Andrew Weininger	Vice Chair	Verona	Senate Majority Leader	5/1/2029	Republican
Gerald Ptacek	Commissioner	Racine	Governor	5/1/2026	Republican
Maryann Sumi	Chair	Middleton	Assembly Minority Leader	5/1/2026	
Debra Kolste	Commissioner	Madison	Senate Minority Leader	5/1/2029	Democratic
Patricia Strachota	Commissioner	West Bend	Assembly Speaker	5/1/2026	Republican
Timothy Van Akkeren	Commissioner	Sheboygan	Governor	5/1/2029	Democratic

== History ==
The Wisconsin Ethics Commission was created in 2015 when Governor Scott Walker signed Wisconsin Act 118, which eliminated the Wisconsin Government Accountability Board effective June 30, 2016.

== See also ==
- Florida Commission on Ethics
