= New Mexico State Ethics Commission =

State agency of New Mexico

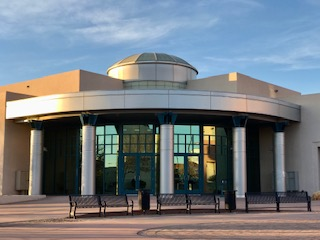
- State Ethics Commission Office Building

Government agency overview
- Formed: Start date: Jan 1, 2020
- Jurisdiction: All state-level public officials, public employees, persons subject to Campaign Reporting Act, lobbyists, lobbyist employers, state contractors, and seekers of state contracts
- Headquarters: 800 Bradbury Dr. SE, Suite 217 Albuquerque, New Mexico 87106
- Parent department: Independent
- Website: https://www.sec.state.nm.us/

The New Mexico State Ethics Commission (SEC) is an independent state agency tasked with promoting the integrity of New Mexico State Government through the interpretation, enforcement, and improvement of New Mexico's campaign finance, governmental conduct, procurement, and lobbying laws.

== Background ==
The SEC was created via constitutional amendment in 2018. In 2019, the New Mexico Legislature passed the State Ethics Commission Act which serves as the enabling legislation for the SEC.

=== Jurisdiction ===
The SEC's jurisdiction began on January 1, 2020. The SEC has authority to adjudicate civil complaints arising under nine laws provided for in the State Ethics Commission Act.

=== Responsibilities ===
In addition to adjudicating ethics complaints, the SEC also provides advisory opinions on ethics issues to persons subject to its jurisdiction, conducts ethics trainings, and is charged with developing and disseminating a model code of ethics.

== See also ==
- Ethics commission
