= List of Jesuit theologians =

This is a list of Jesuit theologians, Roman Catholic theological writers from the Society of Jesus, taken from the Catholic Encyclopedia of 1913, article list and textual allusions, for theologians up to the beginning of the twentieth century.

It is chronologically arranged by date of death.

== 16th century ==
- Pierre Busée (1540–1587)
- John Gibbons (1544–1589)
- Lawrence Arthur Faunt (1554–1590)
- Hermann Thyräus (1532–1591)
- Peter Canisius (1521–1597)

== 17th century ==
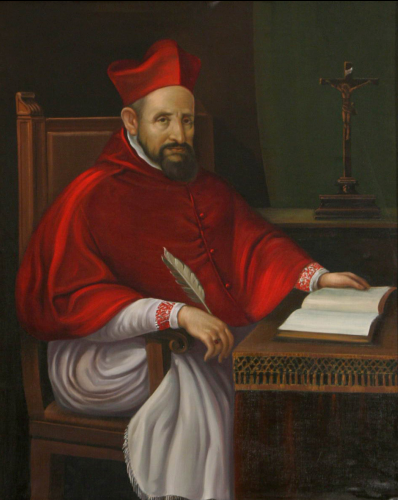
Saint Robert Bellarmine SJ, writer of the Disputationes de controversiis christianae fidei

- Luis de Molina (1535–1600)
- Gabriel Vasquez (1551–1604)
- Enrique Henríquez (1536–1608)
- Martin Anton Delrio (1551–1608)
- Francisco Suárez (1548–1617)
- Robert Bellarmine (1542–1621)
- Diego Ruiz de Montoya (1562–1632)
- Giles de Coninck (1571–1633)
- Fernando Castro Palao (1581–1633)
- Agostino Bernal (1587–1642)
- Caspar Hurtado (1575–1647)
- Wilhelm Lamormaini (1570–1648)
- Francisco de Lugo (1580–1652)
- Juan de Dicastillo (1584–1653)
- Nicholas Abram (1589–1655)
- Maximilian van der Sandt (1578–1656)
- Laurenz Forer (1580–1659), controversialist
- Théophile Raynaud (1583–1663)
- Heinrich Wangnereck (1595–1664)
- Hermann Busembaum (1600–1668), moral theologian
- Francois Annat (1590–1670)
- George Gobat (1600–1679)
- Juan Cárdenas (1613–1684)
- Honoré Fabri (c. 1607 – 1688)
- Jean Crasset (1618–1692)
- Philip Aranda (1642–1695)
- Tobias Lohner (1619–1697)

== 18th century ==
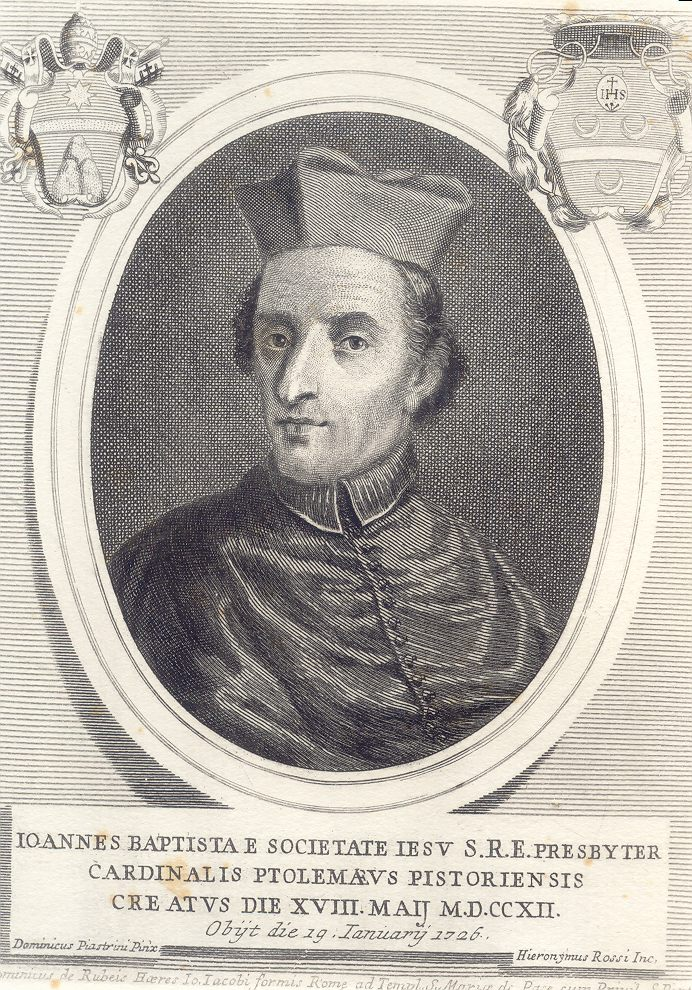
Cardinal Giovanni-Battista Tolomei SJ, wrote Philosophia mentis et sensuum

- Étienne Agard de Champs (1613–1701)
- Jérôme de Gonnelieu (1640–1715)
- William Darrell (1651–1721)
- Henry Robert Stephens (1665–1723)
- John Baptist Tolomei (1653–1726)
- John James Scheffmacher (1668–1733)
- Bartholomew Des Bosses (1668–1738)
- Luis de Lossada (1681–1748)
- Giovanni Battista Scaramelli (1687–1752)
- Jean-Joseph Petit-Didier (1664–1756)
- Franz Neumayr (1697–1765)
- Karl von Haimhausen (1692–1767)
- Andrea Spagni (1716–1788)
- Benedict Stattler (1728–1797)
- Sigismund von Storchenau (1731–1798)
- Manuel Lacunza (1731–1801)

== 19th century ==
- Salvator Tongiorgi (1820–1865)
- Joseph Deharbe (1800–1871)
- Clement Schrader (1820–1875)
- Giovanni Perrone (1794–1876)
- Constantine von Schäzler (1827–1880)
- Antonio Ballerini (1805–1881)
- Pius Melia (1800–1883)
- Louis Jouin (1818–1889)
- Matteo Liberatore (1810–1892)
- Wilhelm Wilmers (1817–1899)

== 20th century ==
- Edward Génicot (1856–1900)
- Jean-Baptiste Terrien (1832–1903)
- Domenico Palmieri (1829–1909)
- Ferdinand Cavallera (1875–1954)
- Pierre Teilhard de Chardin (1881–1955)
- John Courtney Murray (1904–1967)
- Erich Przywara (1889–1972)
- Jean Daniélou (1905–1974)
- Karl Rahner (1904–1984)
- Bernard Lonergan (1904–1984)
- Anthony de Mello (1931–1987)
- Hans Urs von Balthasar (1905–1988)
- Henri-Marie de Lubac (1896–1991)

== 21st century ==
- Avery Dulles (1918–2008)
- Carlo Martini (1927–2012)
- John Navone (1930–2016)
- Joseph Fitzmyer (1920–2016)
- Xavier Tilliette (1921–2018)
- John W. O'Malley (1927–2022)
- Jack Mahoney (1931–2024)
- Robert Murray (1926–2018)
- Aloysius Pieris (1934–present)
- Roger Haight (1936–present)
- Jon Sobrino (1938–present)
- Robert Spitzer (1952–present)
- John Hardon (1914–2000)
- Marko Rupnik (1954–present)
- Kuruvilla Pandikattu (1957–present)
- Felix Körner (1963–present)

== See also ==
- Category:Jesuit theologians
- Molinism
- Probabilism
- List of Benedictine theologians
- List of Franciscan theologians
