= Pha Oudom district =

Pha Oudom district ເມືອງຜາອຸດົມ
- District
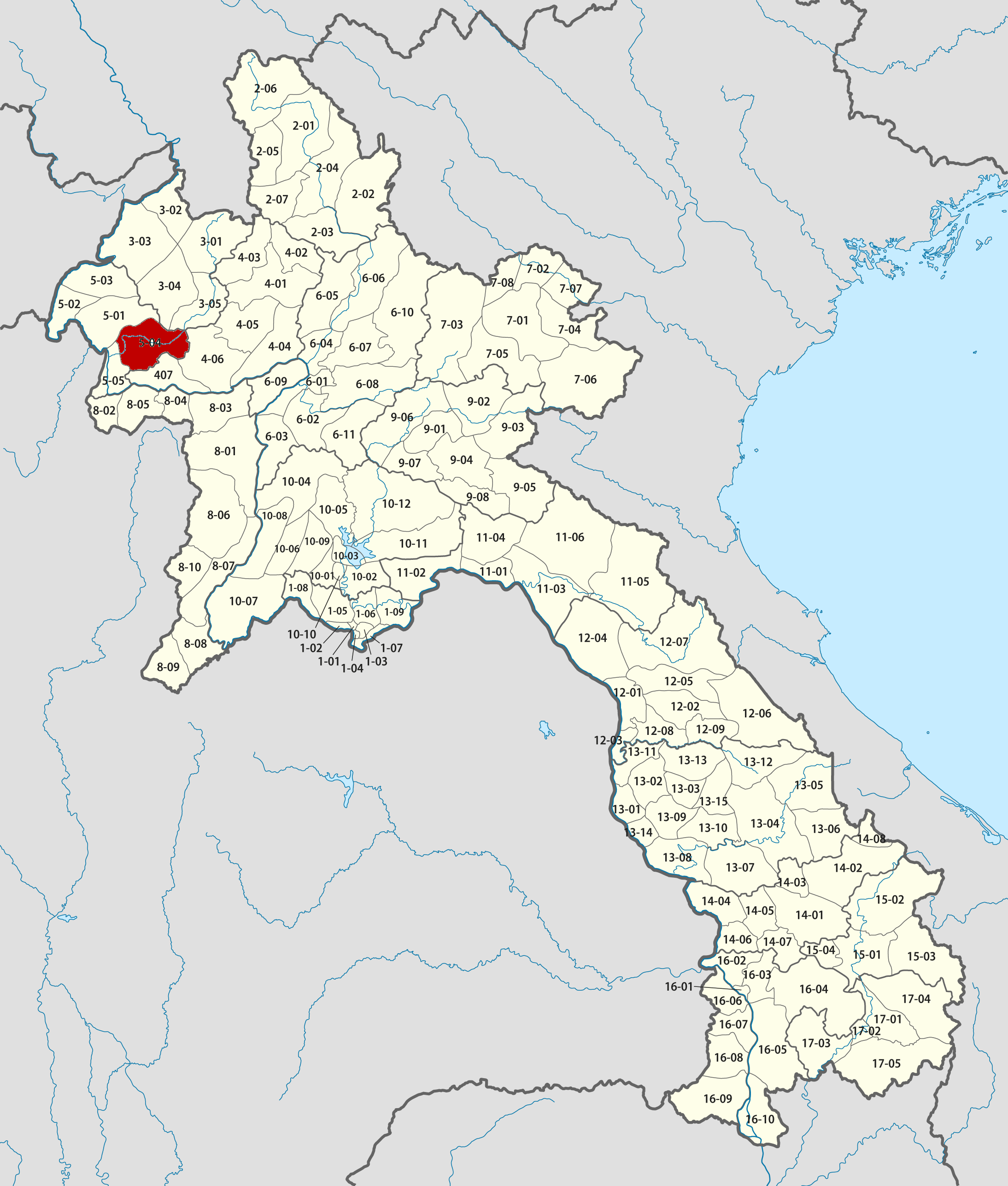
- Location in Laos
- Country: Laos
- Province: Bokeo province

Area
  - Total: 610 sq mi (1,579 km^{2})

Population
  - Total: 36,400
  - Density: 60/sq mi (23/km^{2})
- Time zone: UTC+7 (ICT)

Pha Oudom is a district (muang) of Bokeo province in northwestern Laos. The district, along with Pak Tha district, was part of Oudomxay province until 1992.

== Geography ==
The district is about 50 kilometres southeast of the town of Houayxay and covers an area of 1,579 square kilometres. The district is bordered by Houayxay district to the northwest; Na Le district and Viengphoukha district of Luang Namtha province to the northeast; Houne district of Oudomxay province to the east; Pakbeng district to the south; and Pak Tha district of Bokeo to the west. It has a population of about 36,400 people. The district is remote and mountainous can be divided into two regions: highlands at 800 metres above sea level which comprises about 65% of the land area and lowlands at 400 metres elevation. The Nam Tha River is the chief watercourse in the district.

=== Settlements ===
Pha Oudom contains 94 villages, 54 of them are among the poorest communities in Laos. The inhabitants mainly consist of Khmu peoples who constitute about 80 percent of the district population, followed by 12 percent lowlander, and eight percent Hmong. The oldest village in the district is Namkha, established in 1906.

== Economy ==
The economy is based on rice farming and animal husbandry including buffalo.
