= List of Benedictine theologians =

Roman Catholic theological writers

This is a list of Benedictine theologians, in other words Roman Catholic theological writers who were Benedictine monks.

Source: Catholic Encyclopedia of 1913.

- Uhtred
- Anselm of Canterbury (1033–1109)
- Guitmund
- Rabanus Maurus
- Pietro Delfino (1444–1525), Camaldolese
- Jacques Le Bossu (1546–1626)
- François Delfau (1637–1676)
- Antoine-Joseph Mège (1625–1691)
- Paul Mezger (1637–1702)
- Matthieu Petit-Didier (1659–1728)
- Johann Franz Bessel (1672–1749)
- Mattheus Pinna da Encarnaçao (1687–1764)
- Dominic Schram (1722–1797)
- Marian Dobmayer (1753–1805)
- Maurus von Schenkl (1749–1816)
- Donatien de Bruyne (1871–1935)
- Bonifatius Fischer (1915–1997)
