= Juan Azor =

Spanish Jesuit philosopher (b. 1535)

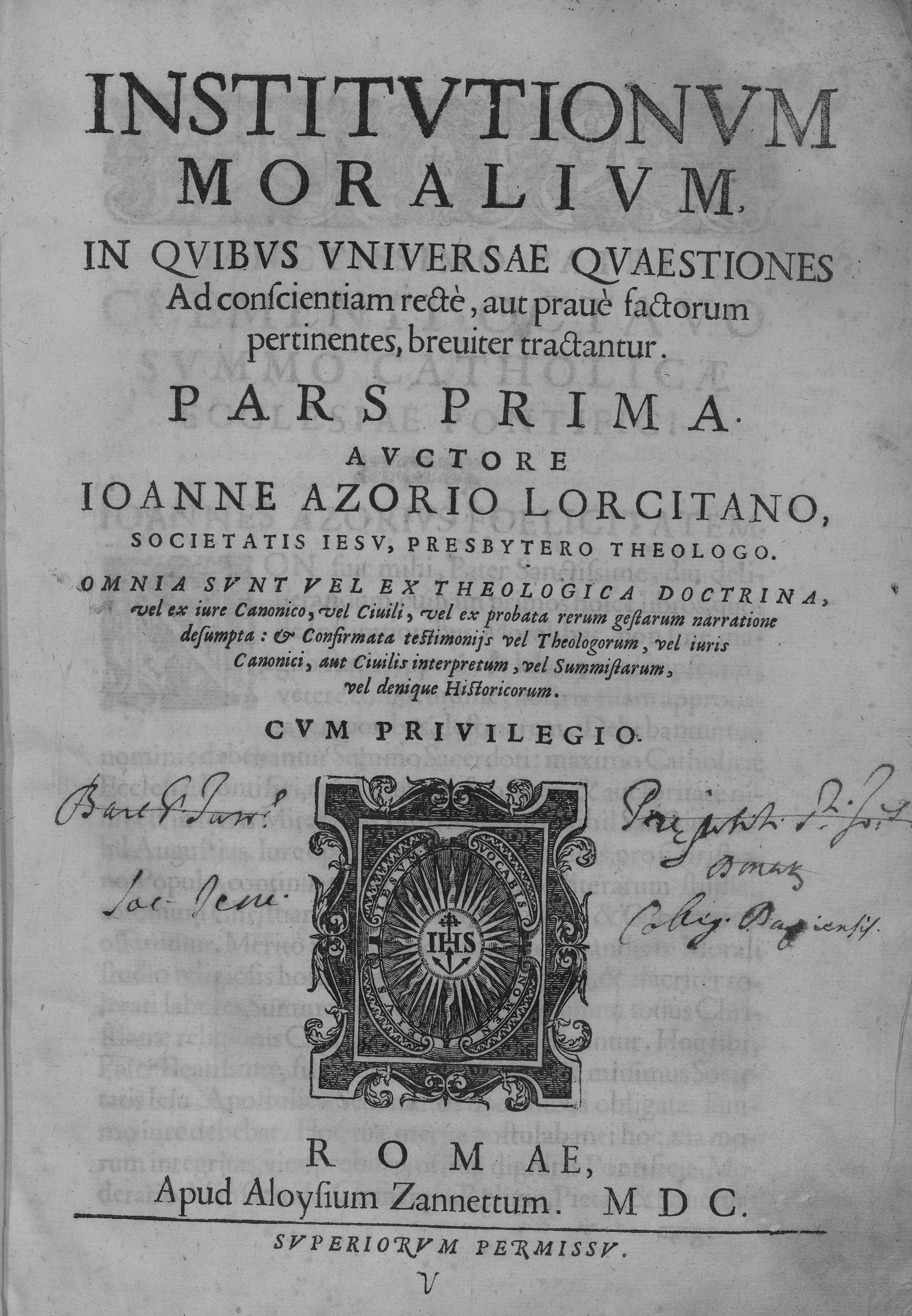
Institutiones morales, 1600

Juan Azor (1535 – 19 February 1603) was a Spanish philosopher and Jesuit priest.

== Life ==
Azor was born at Lorca in the province of Murcia, southern Spain. He entered the Society of Jesus on 18 March 1559, and went on to become professor of philosophy and later of theology, both dogmatic and moral, at Piacenza, Alcalá, and Rome. He was a member of the first committee appointed by Father General Acquaviva to draw up the Jesuit Ratio Studiorum.

== Works ==
Azor was a man of wide learning, versed in Greek, Hebrew, and history. He is best known for his work on moral theology, in three folio volumes: Institutionum Moralium, in quibus universae quaestiones ad conscientiam recte aut prave factorum pertinentes breviter tractantur pars 1ma, the first volume of which appeared in Rome in 1600, the second six years later, and the last in 1611. The work met with flattering success in Rome and at all the Continental seats of learning, and was honored by a special Brief of Pope Clement VIII. Numerous editions were brought out at Brescia, Venice, Lyon, Cologne, Ingolstadt, Paris, Cremona, and Rome. The work continued to hold its position during the succeeding centuries, was strongly recommended by Jacques-Bénigne Bossuet in his synodal statutes, and was held in regard by Alphonsus Ligouri.

Jean-Pierre Gury speaks of Azor as a moderate Probabiliorist. There are extant in manuscript other works by Azor; in Rome, in the Jesuit archives, a commentary on the Canticle of Canticles; at Würzburg, an exposition of the Psalms and at Alcalá, several theological treatises on parts of the Summa Theologiae of Thomas Aquinas.
