= Palau (disambiguation) =

Palau is an island nation in the Pacific Ocean.

Palau may also refer to:

== Places ==
- Palau, Sardinia, a municipality in the Province of Sassari, Sardinia, Italy
- Palaú, a town in Múzquiz, Coahuila, Mexico
- Palau-de-Cerdagne
- Palau-del-Vidre
- Palau-solità i Plegamans

== People ==
- Francisco Palau (1811–1872), beatified Discalced Carmelite Spanish priest
- Josep Palau i Fabre (1917–2008), Catalan poet
- Laia Palau (born 1979), Spanish basketball player
- Luis Palau (1934–2021), Argentine-born Christian evangelist
- Luis Argentino Palau (1896–1971), Argentine chess player
- Pere Palau Torres (1946–2025), Spanish politician
- Pierre Palau (1883–1966), French actor

== Plants ==
- Palau or palaw (also palawan, palauan, or payaw), the common name of the giant swamp taro in the Philippines

== Other ==
- Kabuli Palaw (also known as Palau), an Afghan rice dish
- Orquesta Hermanos Palau, Cuban musical group
- Palau XIII Broncos, a French rugby league club from Palau-del-Vidre
- Palauan language, an Austronesian language, spoken in Palau and Guam
- Survivor: Palau, the tenth installment of the reality program Survivor

== See also ==
- Bälau
- Palao (disambiguation)
- Pulao (disambiguation)
- Palu, a chartered city (kota) on the Indonesian island of Sulawesi
