= Terrien =

Terrien is a surname. Notable people with the name include:

- Albert Terrien de Lacouperie (1844–1894), French orientalist
- David Terrien (born 1976), French racing driver
- Jean-Baptiste Terrien (born 1832), French Jesuit dogmatic theologian
- Samuel Lucien Terrien (1911–2002), French-American Protestant theologian

== See also ==
- Lake Terrien, lake in Quebec, Canada
- Terrien marginal degeneration, thinning of the peripheral corneal stroma
