= Namkha (disambiguation) =

Namkha is a Tibetan Buddhist symbol.

Namkha may also refer to:

- Namkha, Laos
- Namkha, Nepal
