= Nam Nhou Special District =

Nam Nhou
- District
- Nam Nhou District
- Interactive map of Nam Nhou
- Country: Laos
- Admin. division: Bokeo Province
- Time zone: UTC+7 (ICT)

Nam Nhou is a district of Bokeo Province, Laos.
