= Pulau =

Pulau may refer to:

- Pulau virus (PuV), a novel strain of Nelson Bay orthoreovirus species
- Pulau River, a river of Western Papua and Papua New Guinea
- Pulau (film), a 2023 Malaysian horror film

== See also ==
- List of islands of Malaysia, "Pulau" means 'island' in Malaysian Malay
- List of islands of Indonesia, "Pulau" means 'island' in Indonesian Malay
- Pulao (disambiguation)
- Palau (disambiguation)
