= Antonio Ballerini =

Italian Jesuit theologian

Antonio Ballerini (10 October 1805 – 27 November 1881) was an Italian Jesuit theologian.

== Biography ==
Ballerini was born in Medicina, in what is now the Province of Bologna.

He entered the Society of Jesus, on 13 October 1826. He was professor of philosophy at Ferentino, of ecclesiastical history at Rome and at Fermo, of moral theology at the Roman College.

He took a prominent part in the controversies on the writings of Antonio Rosmini, on the moral system of Alphonsus Liguori, and on the relations between the hierarchy and the religious orders, especially in England. He contributed treatises to the discussion of the subject of the Immaculate Conception of the Virgin Mary.

He collaborated to the compilation of the Menology of the Society, and published a compendium of Jean-Pierre Gury. His chief work, the commentary on Busenbaum's Medulla, was completed and published by Domenico Palmieri.

He died in Rome in 1881.

== Bibliography ==
- Sommervogel, Bibliothèque de la Compagnie de Jésus, I (Brussels, 1890)
- Willke, J. C. (2003). "Ballerini, Antonio". New Catholic Encyclopedia. Vol. 2: Baa–Cam (2 ed.). Detroit: Thomson Gale. p. 31.
- Papa, Egidio (1963). "BALLERINI, Antonio". Dizionario Biografico degli Italiani (in Italian). Vol. 5: Bacca–Baratta. Rome: Istituto dell'Enciclopedia Italiana. OCLC 883370.
