= Jean-Pierre Gury =

French theologian

Jean-Pierre Gury (23 January 1801 in Mailleroncourt, Haute-Saône – 18 April 1866 in Mercœur, Haute-Loire) was a French Jesuit moral theologian. He is accounted one of the restorers of the old casuistic method, a fact that made him worthy of personifying the "Jesuit Moral" in the eyes of some, who, especially in Germany, attacked his doctrine. An ardent follower of Hermann Busenbaum and of Alphonsus Ligouri, he contributed largely towards the final defeat of Jansenism.

== Life ==
He entered the Society of Jesus at Montrouge, 22 August 1824; he taught moral theology for thirty-five years at the seminary of Vals, France, 1834–47 and 1848–66, and for one year at Rome, 1847-48.

== Works ==
It was in 1850, after his return from Rome necessitated by the events of 1848, that the first edition of his Compendium theologiæ moralis appeared, which at the time of the author's death had reached the seventeenth edition, to mention neither the German translation of Wesselack (Ratisbon, 1858), not the imitations and adaptations published in Belgium, Italy, Spain, Austria, and Germany. In the last-named country the annotated edition of Seitz itself already reached the fifth edition in 1874 (Ratisbon). Deserving of note is the specially annotated edition of Antonio Ballerini and Domenico Palmieri (Prato, 15th ed., 1907); the edition of Dumas (5th ed., Lyons, 1890); the abridged edition of Sabetti-Barret (New York and Cincinnati, 1902, 16th ed.); the edition adapted to Spain and Latin America by Ferreres (Barcelona, 4th ed., 1909); finally the Compendium ad mentis P. Gury by Bulot (Tournay and Paris, 1908).

In 1862, Gury published his Casus conscientiæ in præcipuas quæstiones theologiæ moralis. Of this work the following editions have appeared: Dumas, 8th ed., Lyons, 1891; Ferreres, for the second time in 1908 (Barcelona); and a German edition at Ratisbon (7th ed., 1886).

The brevity of the compendium led inevitably to a lack of scientific solidarity. For the uses of his classes at Vals, Gury lithographed a more scientific manual which was never published.

His mind was essentially practical, orderly and clear. His method was to proceed by question and answer, taking in the exposition of principles and their conclusions, and finally adding the discussion of more special points. He also knew how to blend happily in his lessons solidity and variety, a quality that gained for him the appointment to the chair of moral theology at the Roman College from Jan Roothaan. Opportunity for actual contact with souls was afforded him by numerous confessions, which he heard during retreats and missions conducted by him in vacations.
