= Meung district =

Meung district ເມືອງເມິງ
- District
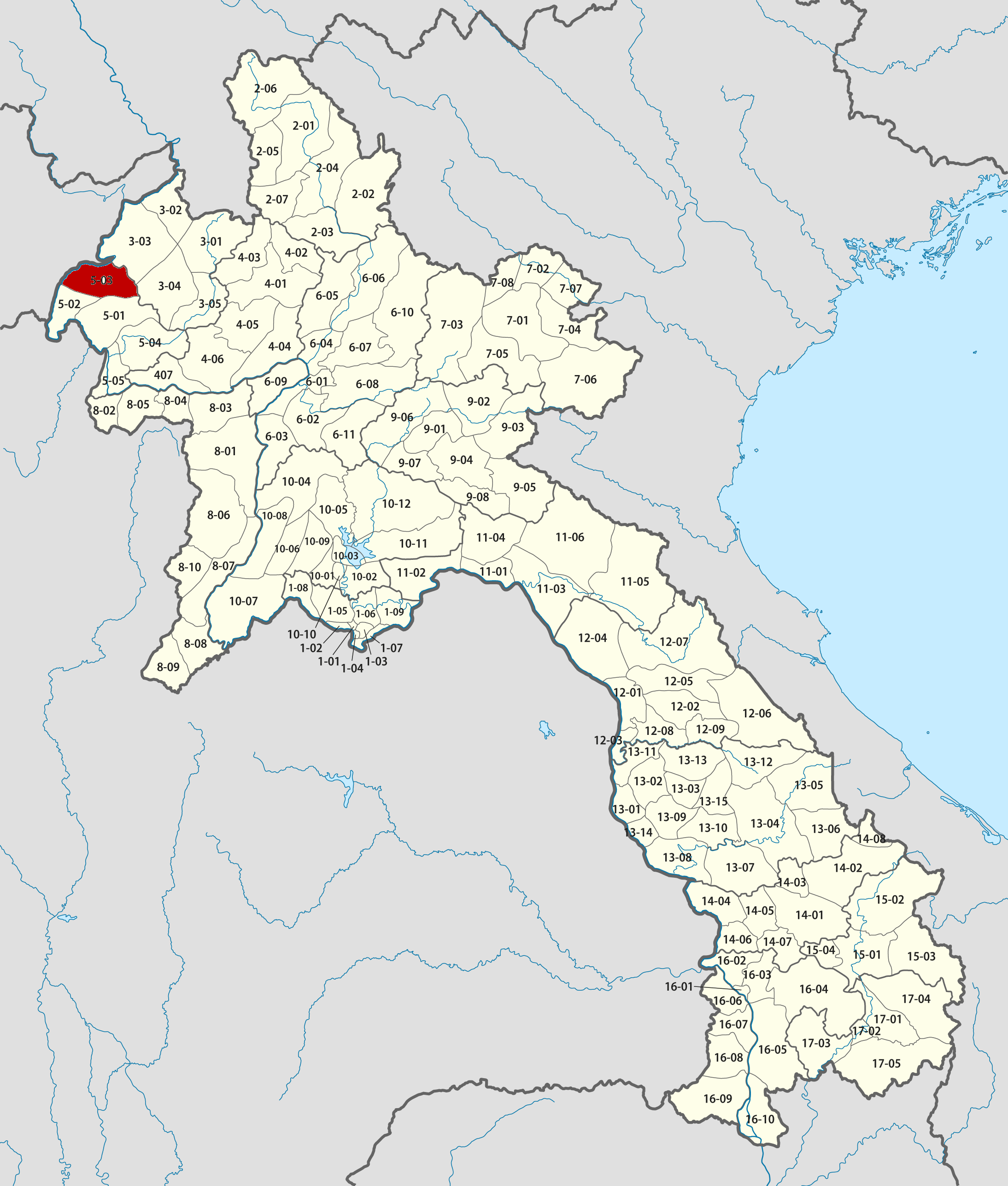
- Location in Laos
- Country: Laos
- Province: Bokeo province
- Time zone: UTC+7 (ICT)

Meung is a district (muang) of Bokeo province in northwestern Laos.
