= Manuel Álvares =

Portuguese Jesuit priest (1526-1582)

Reverend Manuel Álvares SJ
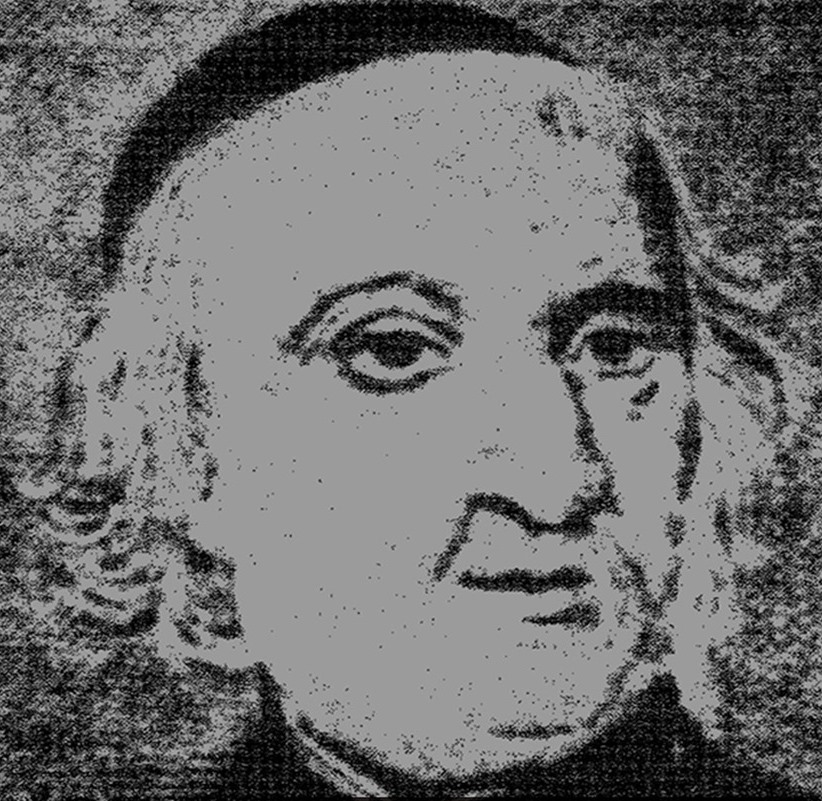
- Manuel Álvares
- Born: June 4, 1526; Ribeira Brava, Madeira, Kingdom of Portugal
- Died: 30 December 1582 (aged 56); Évora, Kingdom of Portugal
- Occupations: Jesuit priest; Grammarian; Philologist; Writer
- Known for: De Institutione Grammatica Libri Tres (1572, and many subsequent editions)
- Parent(s): Sebastião Gonçalves and Beatriz Álvares

Academic background
- Education: University of Évora
- Influences: Donatus; Priscian; Guarino; Despauterius; Vives

Academic work
- Discipline: Classical scholar
- Sub-discipline: Latinist
- Institutions: Colégio de Santo Antão

Manuel Álvares SJ (4 June 1526 – 30 December 1582) was a Jesuit educator in Portugal. His Latin grammar, De institutione grammatica libri tres, is considered one of the worldwide most influential Latin grammars ever.

== Life and works ==
Manuel Álvares was born on the island of Madeira. In 1546 he entered the Society of Jesus, taught classics with great success, and was rector of the colleges of Coimbra and Évora. He died at Évora.

Among the more than three hundred Jesuits who have written text-books on different languages, he takes the foremost place. His Latin grammar was adopted as a standard work by the Ratio Studiorum, or Plan of Studies, of the Jesuits. Perhaps no other grammar has been printed in so many editions; Carlos Sommervogel, in his "Bibliothèque de la compagnie de Jésus," devotes twenty-five columns to a list of about four hundred editions of the whole work, or parts of it, published in Europe, Asia, and America. There exist also numerous translations into various languages. An edition with a Chinese translation appeared in Shanghai in 1869. A very interesting edition is one published in Japan in 1594, with partial translation into Japanese. An English edition, "An Introduction to the Latin Tongue, or First Book of Grammar", appeared in 1686. In many editions the text of Álvares is changed considerably, others are abridgments. The original work contains many valuable suggestions for the teacher. On this account it is more than a mere grammar; it is also a work on the method of teaching Latin, and gives an insight into the system of the old Jesuit colleges.

The book was the subject of several controversies. Even Jesuits, in the "Trial Ratio" of 1586, raised six objections, and desired, particularly, a better arrangement of some parts and greater clarity. After the publication of Latin grammars by De Condren, the Oratorian, and by Lancelot, of Port-Royal, both in French, the work of Álvares was frequently censured, because it was written in Latin, and "presupposed what was to be learnt".

Still, there were advantages in the course followed by Álvares. To be sure, to beginners everything was explained in the vernacular; but the early use of a grammar written in Latin accustomed the pupils to speaking and writing that language. Without some practice of this kind a thorough knowledge of a language can hardly be obtained, and in former centuries a facility in speaking and writing Latin, which was the universal language of the educated world, was of the greatest importance.

== List of works ==
- Álvares, Manuel, ed. (1569). M. Val. Martialis Epigrammaton selectorum libri XIIII. Coimbra: João Barreiro.
- Álvares, Manuel (1571). De constructione octo partium orationis. Venice: Michele Tramezzino.
- Álvares, Manuel, De Institutione Grammaticae Libri Tres (A good edition of the complete work is that published in Paris, 1850)

== Bibliography ==
- Media related to Manuel Álvares at Wikimedia Commons
- Schwickerath, Robert, Jesuit Education: Its History and Principles Viewed in the Light of Modern Educational Problems (St. Louis 1904)
- Sommervogel, Carlos, Bibliothèque de la compagnie de Jésus (Brussels and Paris, 1890)
- Pachter, G.M., Monumenta Germaniae Paedagogica (Berlin, 1887)
- Schmid, Friedrich, Geschichte der Erziehung (Stuttgart, 1892). III, part I
- Kemmler, Rolf (2022). "A Jesuit grammar in the Anglican London of King James II: The first English edition of Manuel Álvares' Latin grammar (1686–1687)". Language & History. 66 (1): 33–58. doi:10.1080/17597536.2022.2038003.
