= Namkha, Laos =

Village in Pha Oudom, Bokeo Province, Laos

Namkha ບ້ານນ້ຳກ້າ ນ້ຳກັດ Ban Namkha
- Village
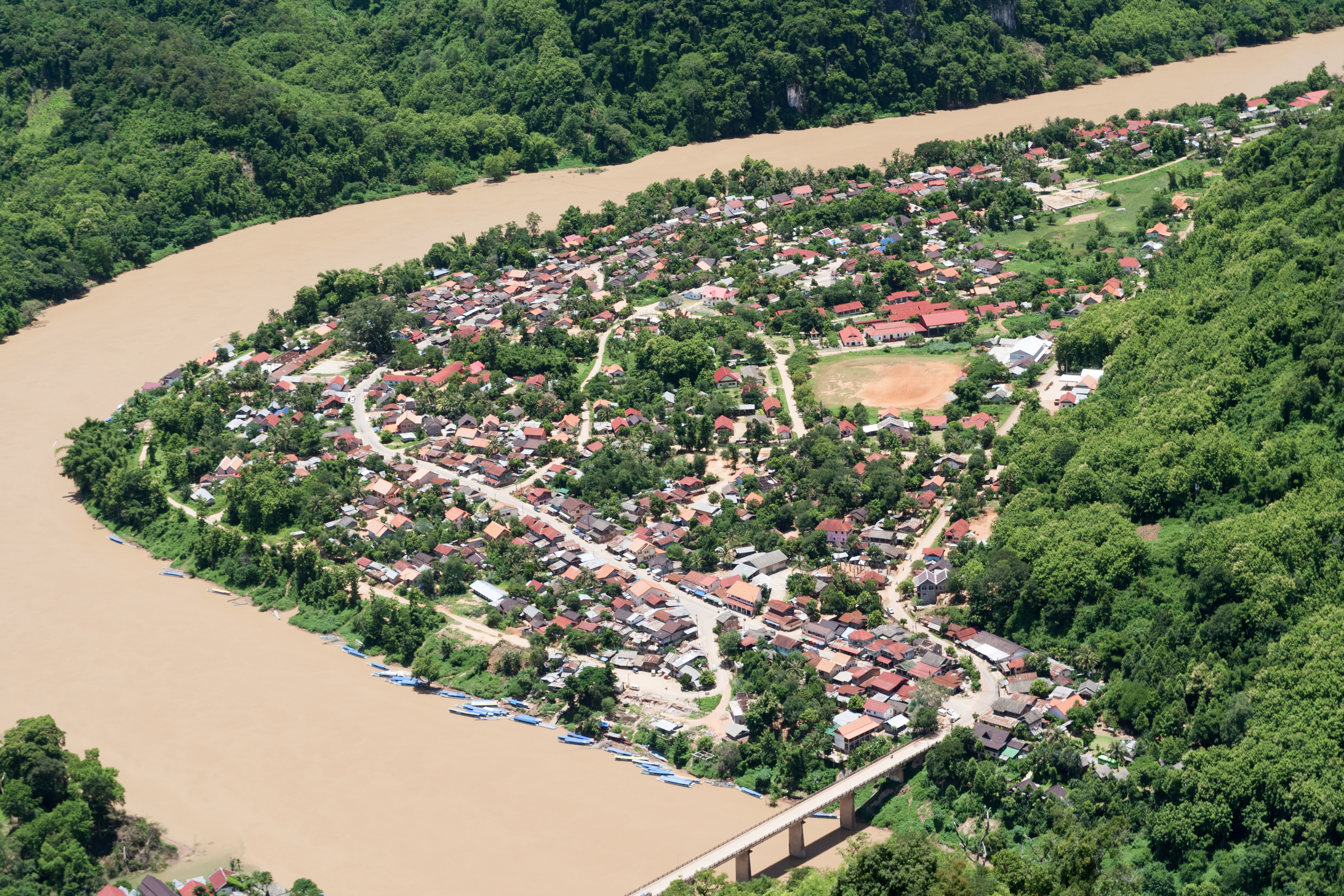
- Namkha village
- Motto: "Where Tradition Meets Adventure"
- Location in Pha Oudom
- Coordinates: 20°4′47″N 100°47′57″E
- Country: Laos
- Province: Bokeo Province
- District: Pha Oudom District
- Elevation: 1,011 m (3,317 ft)
- Time zone: UTC+7 (ICT)

Namkha or Ban Namkha (Note: Lao pronunciation: [nam mkʰaʔ] or Lao pronunciation: [bâːn náːm kʰâm].) (Lao: ນ້ຳກັດ or ບ້ານນ້ຳກ້າ) is a village in Pha Oudom District in Bokeo Province of northwestern Laos. It is the oldest village in the district, established in 1906 by the Lao Lom people.

The village lies in between the Nam Haad River and a tree populated area in the Pha Oudom District. While populated of the village is unknown due to information, it is said to be mildly population ranging from 4,035 to 5,000. It is northwestern of Laos.

Ethnic groups range from Khmu and Hmong, with both ethnicities being very populated in the village. The main language that is spoken there is Lao, with the little of village speaking Tibetan, due to the word "Namkha" being in the name. (Note: "Namkha" in Tibetan translates to "sky".)

== History ==
The broader region of Laos, specifically the Xieng Khouang Plateau (Plain of Jars), has prehistoric material dating back to 2000 BC, with the bulk of archaeological material appearing between 500 BC and 800 AD. It was a crossroads for traders. The Tai Puan, a Buddhist Tai-Lao ethnic group, migrated from southern China and established a principality at the Plain of Jars by the 13th century. Therefore, the region around Ban Namkha, being part of this wider plateau, likely experienced settlement and development during this period or earlier.

It was then established by the Lao Lom people in 1906 of the northwestern Laos, in the Pha Oudom District in Bokeo Province, later creating the Namkha.

== Village struggles ==
=== Habitat loss ===
Ban Namkha is situated in a region of northern Laos where deforestation is a major environmental concern. The primary cause of habitat loss in this area is linked to expanding agriculture and unsustainable farming practices. These factors have led to the conversion of forested land into agricultural areas and pastures, impacting local communities and wildlife.

=== Financial struggles ===
Approximately 23% of the Namkha population lives below the national poverty line, which is set at $1.25/day. While the village has experienced economic growth, the benefits haven't been evenly distributed, and inequality has risen.

High public debt and persistent inflation have impacted household incomes and development throughout Namkha. The COVID-19 pandemic and reliance on external debt, particularly from China, have further strained the economy, leading to inflation and a risk of default.

While infrastructure development efforts are ongoing, such as the Northern Rural Infrastructure Development Sector Project, according to the Asian Development Bank, remote areas like Namkha may still experience limited access to vital infrastructure like roads, healthcare facilities, and schools.

== Structures ==
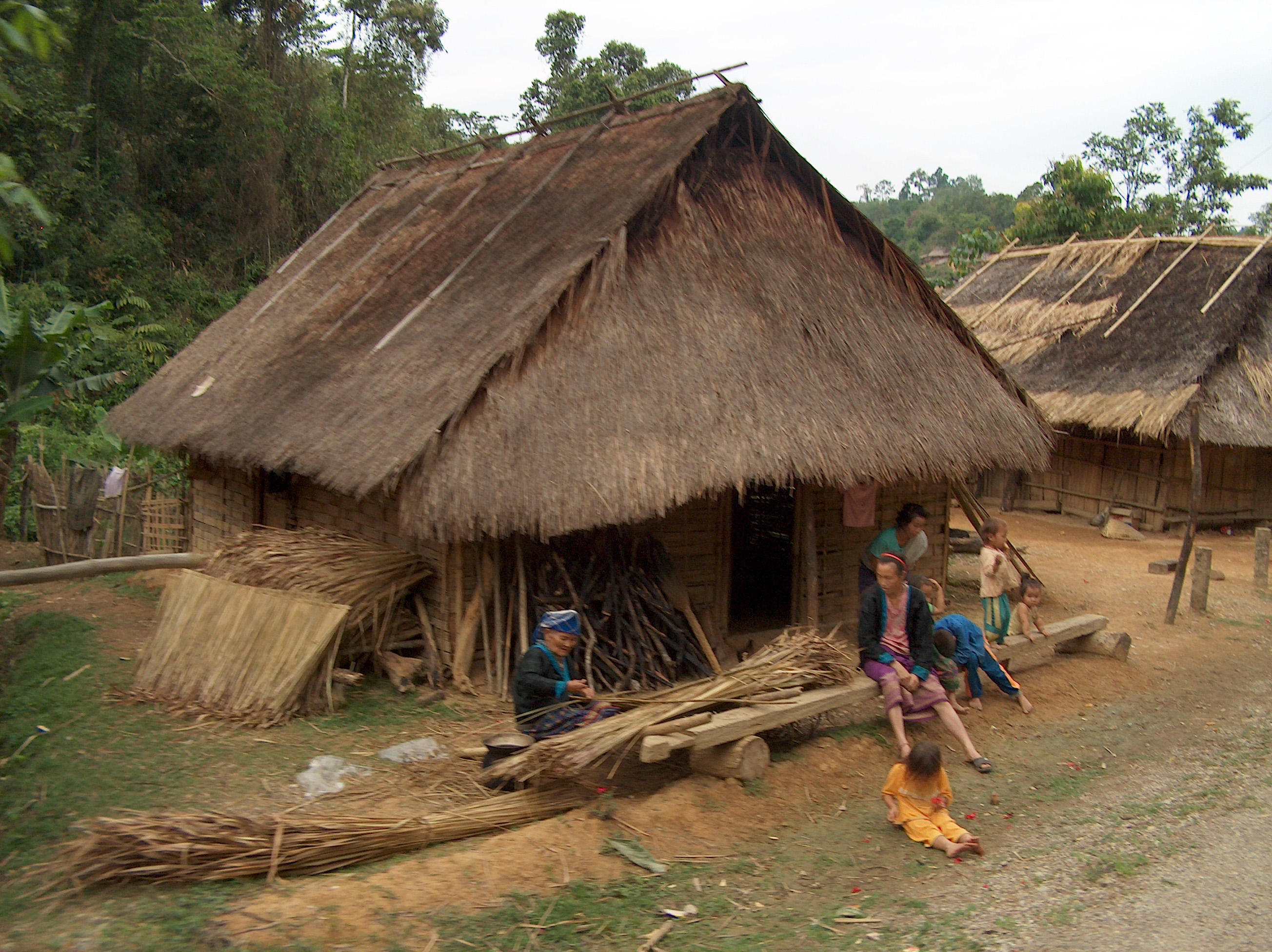
Village houses

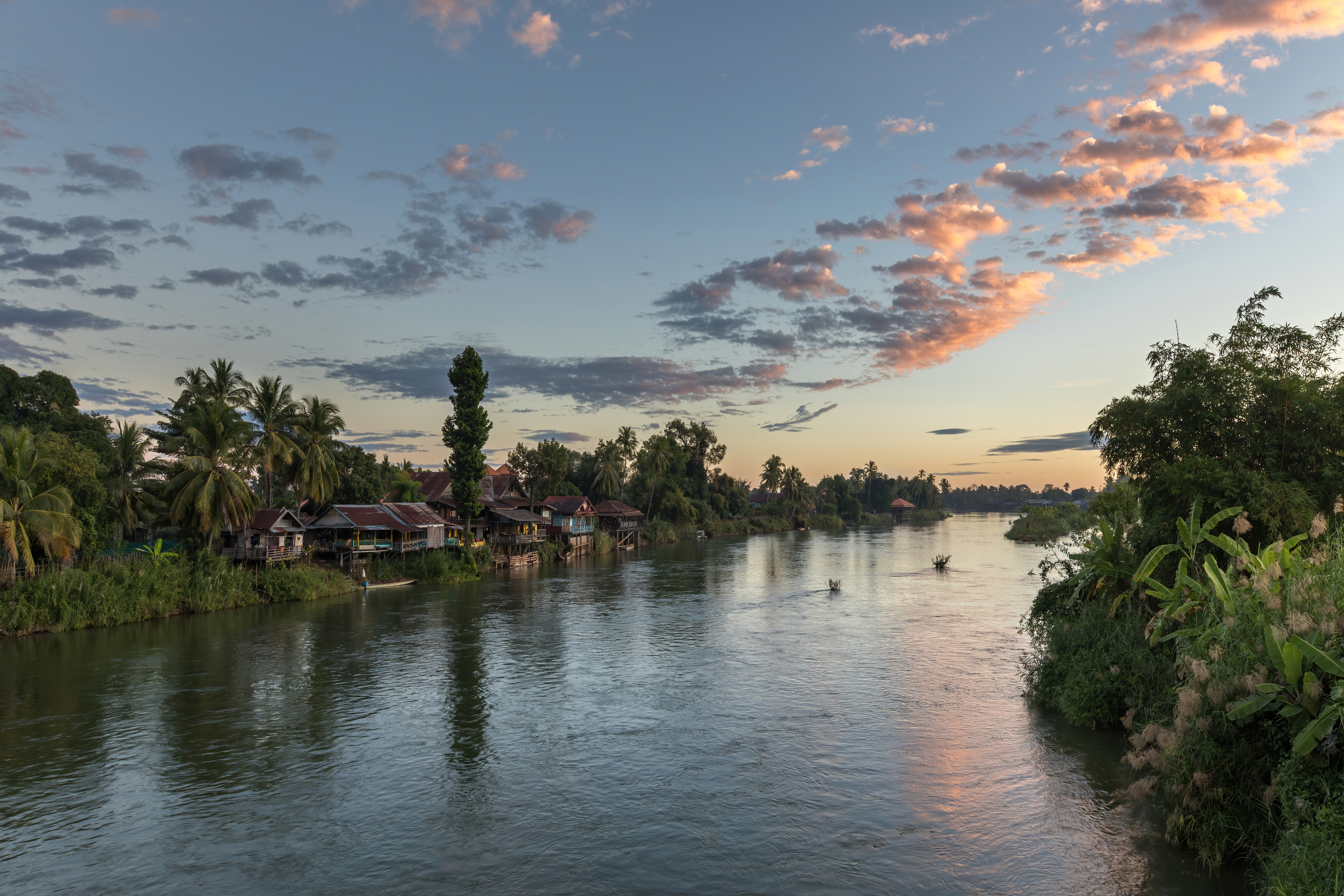
The Nam Haad River

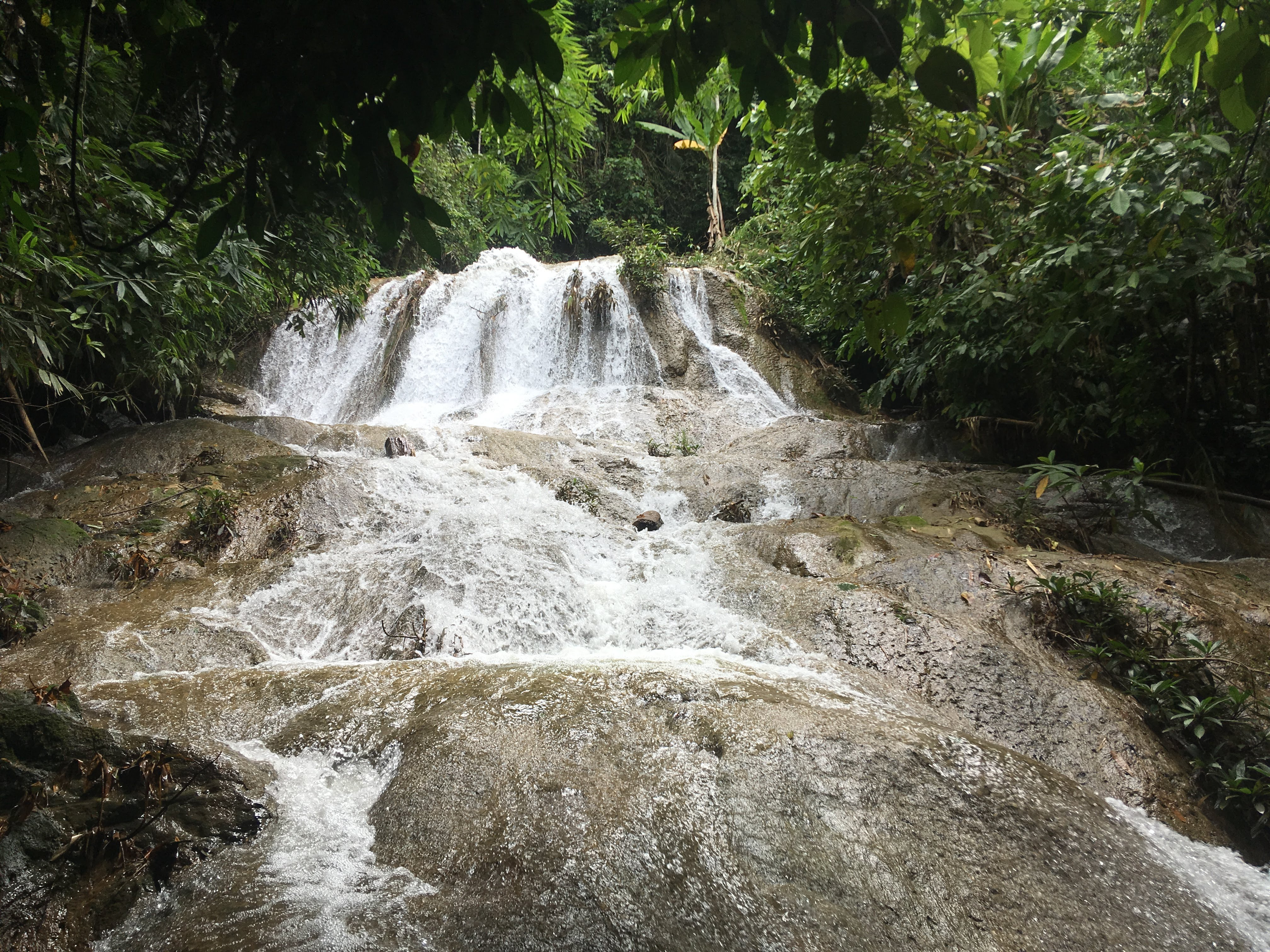
Waterfall inside the forest of Namkha
