= Ratio Studiorum =

Document that standardized the system of Jesuit education in 1599

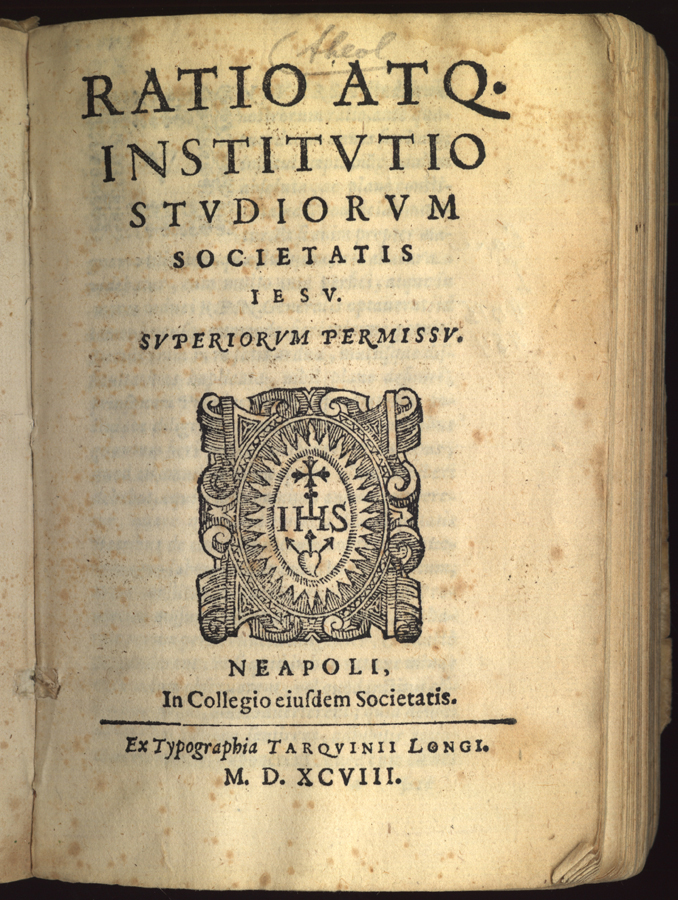
The Ratio Studiorum, dated 1598, formally issued in 1599

The Ratio atque Institutio Studiorum Societatis Iesu (Method and System of the Studies of the Society of Jesus), often abbreviated as Ratio Studiorum (Latin: Plan of Studies), was a document that standardized the globally influential system of Jesuit education in 1599.

The Ratio was a collection of regulations for school officials and teachers. It relied on the classical subjects (theology, philosophy, Latin and Greek) and did not contain any provisions for elementary education. The document was revised in 1832, still built upon the classical subjects but giving more attention to the study of native languages of the students, history, geography, mathematics, and the natural sciences.

The work was the product of many hands and wide experience, but it most directly derives from the efforts of an international team of academics at the Collegio Romano, the Jesuit school in Rome. The Ratio had a major impact on later humanist education. In his Renaissance Literary Theory and Practice, Charles Sears Baldwin writes, "The sixteenth century closed with the full [classical] doctrine operative in the Ratio Studiorum and in the rhetoric of Soarez" (64).

== Historical background ==
The Society of Jesus had not originally envisaged running a network of schools when it was founded, but it soon became progressively involved in and then largely associated with educational work. One hundred years after the order's founding, the Jesuits were running 444 schools. By 1739, they were running 669 schools. The many schools taken over or started by the Society in its first decades all needed plans (rationes). In addition, an increasing number of young men were entering the Society in need of the educational background that was required for priestly service, and the Society began to assume a greater and greater role in the direction of its own formational program. For these two reasons, there grew a great desire for a standard plan for all of the Society's educational institutions.

Under the generalate of Claudio Aquaviva, in 1581, a committee of twelve Jesuit priests was appointed without clear results. A new committee of six was soon formed in 1584: Juan Azor (Spain), Gaspar González (Portugal), James Tyrie (Scotland), Peter Busée (the Netherlands), Anthony Ghuse (Flanders), and Stephen Tucci (Sicily). This committee produced a trial document, the Ratio of 1586, which was sent to various provinces for comments from the teachers. This plan was not intended for actual use in the classrooms. Reflection on the reactions led to the issuance of another document in 1591, which was to be employed in all Jesuit schools for three years. The reflection on these experiments was then used by the committee in Rome to create the final official document of 1599.

The men who contributed in largest measure to the making of the Ratio were Spaniards: Ignatius, Jerome Nadal, Diego de Ledesma, Juan Alfonso de Polanco, Pedro Juan Pepinyá, Diego Laynez, Francis Borgia, Juan Jerónimo Doménech. Cypriano de Soarez, the author of the Rhetoric which was recommended by the Ratio, was also a Spaniard; Manuel Álvares, the author of the Latin grammar used throughout the Society, a Portuguese. Other nations, of course, contributed no mean share. Italy was represented by Fulvio Cardulo among the first, and afterwards by Antonio Possevino, Giovanni Pietro Maffei, Francesco Benci, Orazio Torsellino, Stefano Tucci, and Giulio Negrone; France by André des Freux and Jean Pelletier; Germany by Peter Canisius, Leonard Kessel, Christopher Clavius (Klau) and Jacobus Pontanus (Spanmüller).

== Content ==
The Ratio Studiorum was divided into the following sections:

I. Rules for the provincial superior; for the rector of the college; for the prefect of studies, who supervises classes and instruction, and the prefect of discipline, who maintains order and discipline;

II. Rules for the professors of theology: Scripture, Hebrew language, dogmatic theology, ecclesiastical history, canon law, and moral theology. St. Thomas Aquinas was the main author for theological texts.

III. Rules for the professors of philosophy, physics, and mathematics. Aristotle was prescribed as the standard author.

IV. Rules for the teachers of the studia inferiora (the lower department): Latin and Greek, grammar and syntax, humanities and rhetoric. Other subjects were taught from the beginning under the name of "accessories"—especially history, geography, and antiquities.

== See also ==
- Collège Henri-IV
- Manoel Alvarez
- Trivium
- Quadrivium
