= Louis Ellies du Pin =

French ecclesiastical historian (1657–1719)

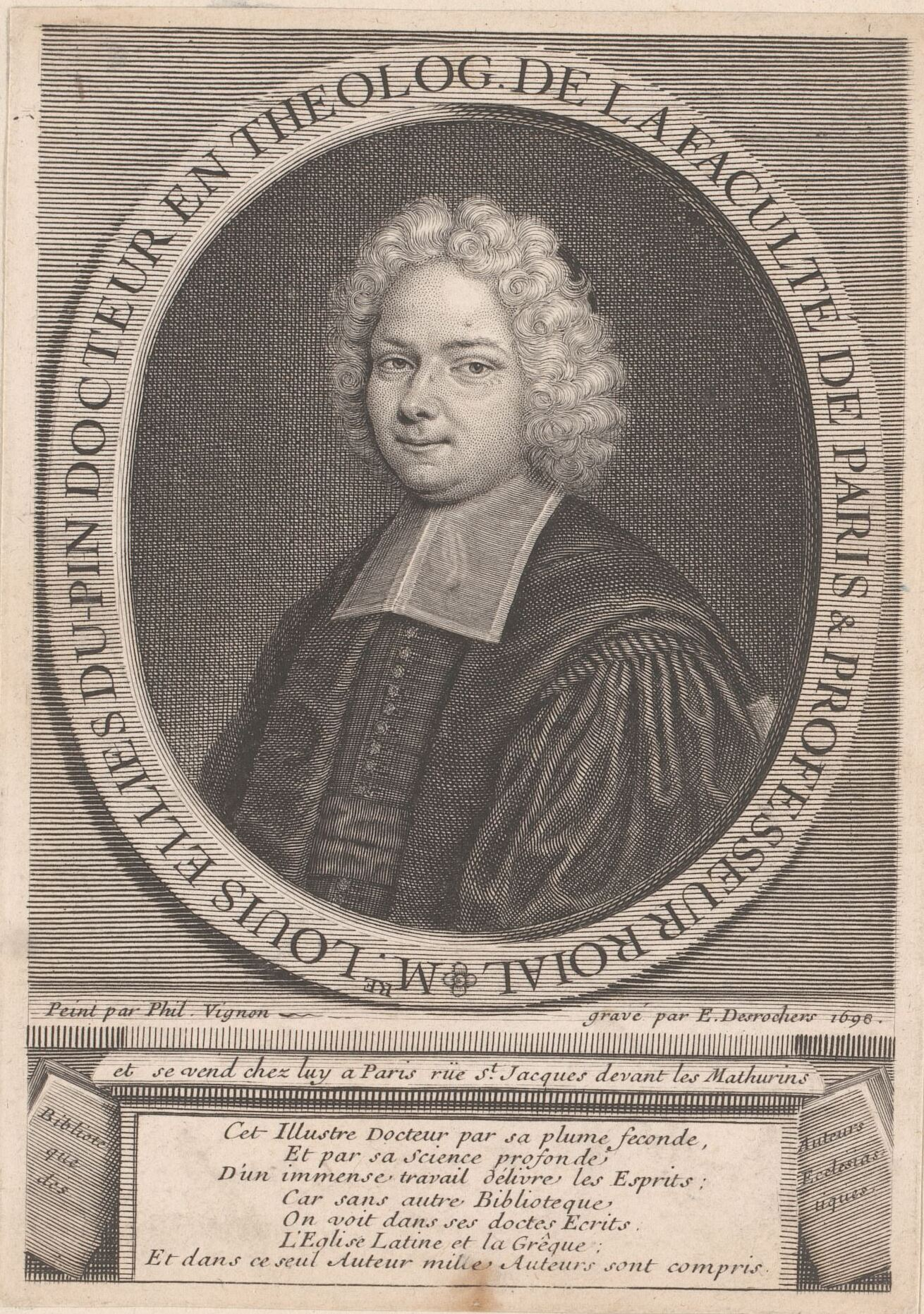
Louis Ellies Dupin

Louis Ellies du Pin or Dupin (17 June 1657 – 6 June 1719) was a French ecclesiastical historian, who was responsible for the Nouvelle bibliothèque des auteurs ecclésiastiques.

== Childhood and education ==
Dupin was born at Paris, coming from a noble family of Normandy. His mother, a Vitart, was the niece of Marie des Moulins, grandmother of the poet Jean Racine. When ten years old he entered the college of Harcourt, where he graduated M.A. in 1672. At the age of twenty, he accompanied Racine, who made a visit to Nicole for the purpose of becoming reconciled to the gentlemen of Port Royal. But, while not hostile to the Jansenists, Dupin's intellectual attraction was in another direction; he was the disciple of Jean Launoy, a learned critic and a Gallican. He became a pupil of the Sorbonne, and received the degree of B.D. in 1680 and that of D.D. in 1684.

== Nouvelle bibliothèque des auteurs ecclésiastiques ==
About 1684 Dupin conceived the idea of his Nouvelle bibliothèque des auteurs ecclésiastiques, the first volume of which appeared in 1686. In it he treated simultaneously biography, literary criticism, and the history of dogma; in this he was a pioneer leaving far behind him all previous efforts, Catholic or Protestant, which were still under the influence of the Scholastic method. He was also the first to publish such a collection in a modern language. He was young and worked rapidly; errors crept into his writings and his productions were violently attacked.

Mathieu Petit-Didier, a Benedictine monk, published an anonymous volume of Remarques sur la bibliothèque des auteurs ecclésiastiques de M. Du Pin (Paris, 1691), and this was followed by two other volumes to which the author's name was appended (Paris, 1692 and 1696). Dupin answered him in his fifth volume and Petit-Didier responded in the opening part of his second volume of Remarques. Petit-Didier's observations often seem inspired by prejudices of his time. Thus Dupin had placed St. Macarius the Egyptian in the 4th century, to which indeed he rightly belongs. Having discovered Semipelagianism in this author's works, Petit-Didier concluded that Macarius should come after Pelagius and St. Augustine (II, 198). In reality similar ideas had been professed by many before St. Augustine's time.

A more formidable enemy appeared in Bossuet, who, during a public thesis at the Collège de Navarre in 1692, condemned Dupin's audacity. Dupin answered him and Bossuet appealed to the civil authority, denouncing Dupin to the Chancellor of France, Louis Boucherat and to Archbishop de Harlay of Paris. Bossuet simply enumerated the points in the Bibliothèque of which he disapproved. These concerned original sin, purgatory, the canonicity of the Sacred Scriptures, the eternity of hell's torments, the veneration of saints and of their relics, the adoration of the Cross, grace, the pope and the bishops, Lent, divorce, the celibacy of the clergy, tradition, the Eucharist, the theology of the Trinity, and the Council of Nicæa. He demanded a censure and a retractation.

Like Petit-Didier, Bossuet would not admit that any of the Greek or Latin Fathers differed from St. Augustine on the subject of grace, nor that this matter could be called subtle, delicate, and abstract. Between Dupin and Bossuet there was a still wider difference and Bossuet wrote, "The liberty M. Dupin takes of so harshly condemning the greatest men of the Church should, in general, not be tolerated". On the other hand, Bossuet strongly contended that heretics could not be too severely dealt with: "It is dangerous to call attention to passages that manifest the firmness of these people without also indicating wherein this firmness has been overrated: otherwise they are credited with a moral steadfastness which elicits sympathy and leads to their being excused". Dupin submitted, but was nevertheless condemned by the Archbishop of Paris (14 April 1696).

Dupin continued his Bibliothèque, which was put on the Index long after his death (10 May 1757), though other works of his were condemned at an earlier date. He was also criticized by Richard Simon, though the two had similar views and employed similar methods so that when Bossuet was writing the Défense de la Tradition et des Saints Pères (which did not appear, however, until 1743), he included both in his invectives against the "haughty critics" who inclined to rabbinism and the errors of Socinus. Although Dupin spoke favourably of Arnauld and signed the "Cas de conscience", he was not a Jansenist. Rather, on these matters he shared the opinions of Launoy, who "had found a way to be at once both demi-Pelagian and Jansenist".

== Exile and return ==
Dupin was pre-eminently a Gallican. It was probably on this account that Louis XIV had him exiled to Châtellerault, on the occasion of the "Cas de conscience". Dupin retracted and returned, but his chair in the College of France was irretrievably lost. Later Dubois, who aspired to the cardinalate and sought therefore the favour of Rome, made similar accusations against Dupin.

In 1718 he entered into a correspondence with William Wake, archbishop of Canterbury, with a view to a union of the English and Gallican churches; being suspected of projecting a change in the dogmas of the church, his papers were seized in February 1719, but nothing incriminating was found. The same zeal for union induced him, during the residence of Peter the Great in France, and at that monarch's request, to draw up a plan for uniting the Greek and Roman churches. He died at Paris on 6 June 1719.

Etienne Jordan, a contemporary who saw him, said: in "the morning he would grow pale over books and in the afternoon over cards in the pleasant company of ladies. His library and adjoining apartment were marvellously well kept."

== Works ==
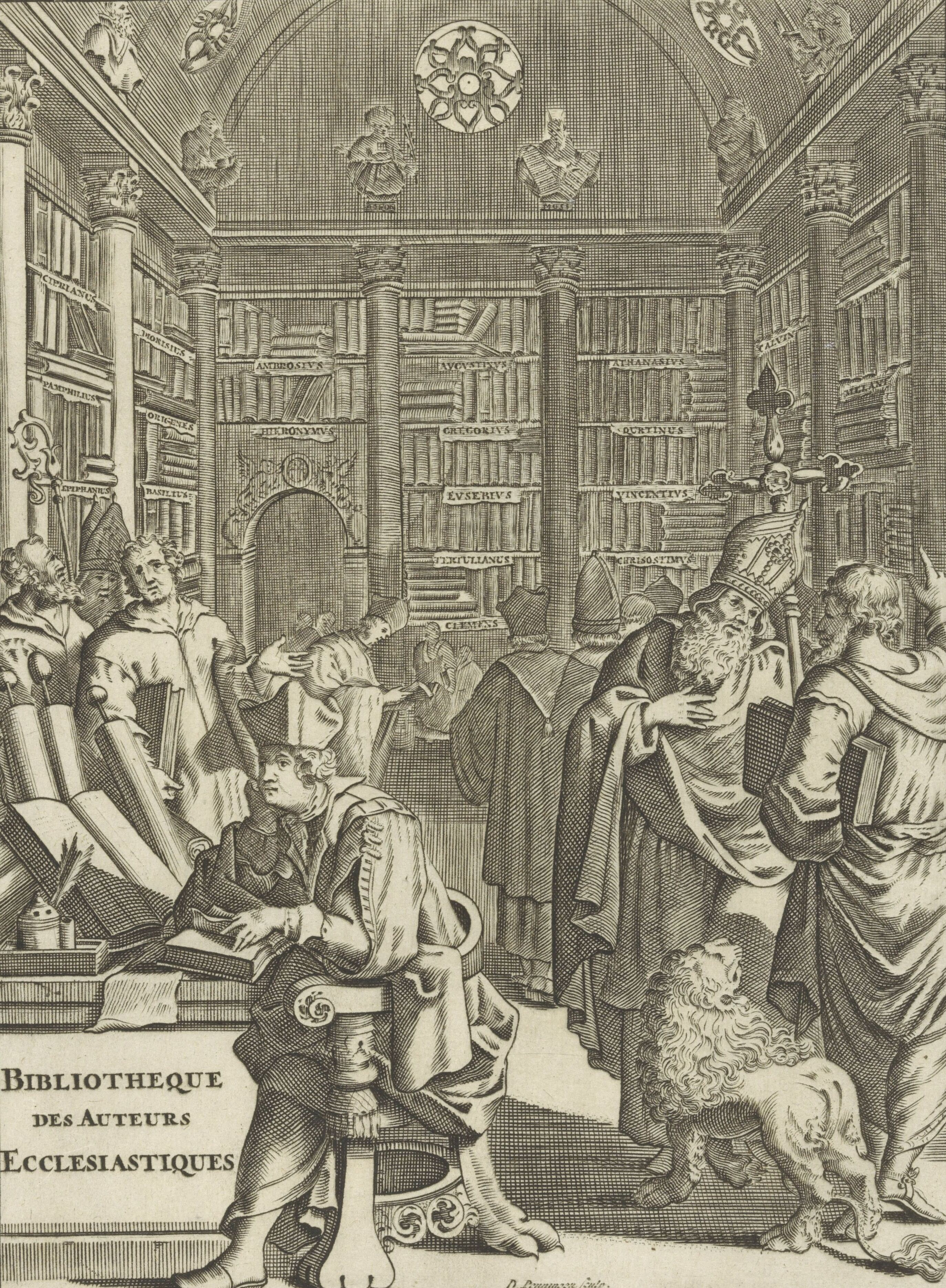
Title page of the Nouvelle Bibliotheque des Auteurs Ecclesiastiques, Amsterdam, Huguetan, 1691

Dupin edited works including:

- Nouvelle bibliothèque ecclésiastique (58 vols. 8vo with tables)
- Petit-Didier, Remarques
- R. Simon, Critique (reprinted in Holland, 19 vols. 4to; translated into English and annotated by William Wotton in 13 vols, 1692–9)
- the works of Gerson (Paris, 1703)
- the works of Optatus of Mileve (Paris, 1700)
- the Psalms with annotations (1691)

He also published:

- Notes sur le Pentateuque (1701)
- an abridgment of L'histoire de l'Eglise (1712)
- L'histoire profane (1714–1716)
- de Clairac, L'histoire d'Apollonius de Tyane (1705)
- Traité de la puissance ecclésiastique et temporelle, a commentary on the Four Articles of the clergy of France (1707)
- Bibliothèque universelle des historiens (1716)

as well as numerous works and articles on theology, reprints of former works, etc.
