= Lao Lom =

Lao Loum
Total population
- 27,000 (est.)

Regions with significant populations
- Thailand, Laos

Languages
- Thai, Lao

Religion
- Theravada Buddhism

The Lao Loum (Thai: ลาวหล่ม, pronounced [lāːw lòm]), also called Tai Lom (ไทหล่ม, pronounced [tʰāj lòm]) or Tai Loei (ไทเลย, pronounced [tʰāj lɤ̄ːj]), are an ethnic group in Thailand and Laos.

== Geographic distribution ==
The Lao Lom have a population of approximately 27,000 spread out over the Loei, Phetchabun, Phitsanulok and Nong Khai Provinces of Thailand. There are also Lao Lom in the Bokeo Province of Laos.

== Culture ==
The Lao Lom are known for a social way of life.

== Religion ==
- Theravada Buddhism
