= Palao =

Palao may refer to:

== Places ==
- Palao, a community in Namkha, Laos
- Palao, a neighbourhood of San Martín de Porres District, Lima, Peru
- Palao, a barangay in Bangued, Abra, Philippines
- Palao, a barangay in Solana, Cagayan, Philippines
- Pala-o, a barangay in Iligan, Lanao Del Norte, Philippines
- Pa Lao, a subdistrict of Mueang Phetchabun district, Phetchabun province, Thailand

== People ==
- Fernando Castro Palao (1581–1633), Spanish Jesuit theologian
- Jimmy Palao (1879–1925), African-American jazz musician
- George Palao (1940–2009), Gibraltarian historian and illustrator
- Alec Palao (born 1962), British musician, music historian and reissue producer
- Ongina (born Ryan Ong Palao, 1982), Filipino-American drag performer and HIV awareness activist

== See also ==
- Palau, an island country located in the western Pacific Ocean
- Palaw, a town in the Taninthayi Division, Myanmar
- Pilaf, a dish consisting of rice cooked in a seasoned broth, sometimes called pulao or palao
