= Pulao =

Pulao may refer to:

- Pilaf, a popular rice dish consumed mainly in Central Asia, South Asia and the Middle East
- Pulao (dragon), a small dragon that appears as a decoration on Chinese bells

== See also ==
- Palao (disambiguation)
- Pulau (disambiguation)
