= Vieng Phouka =

- Town
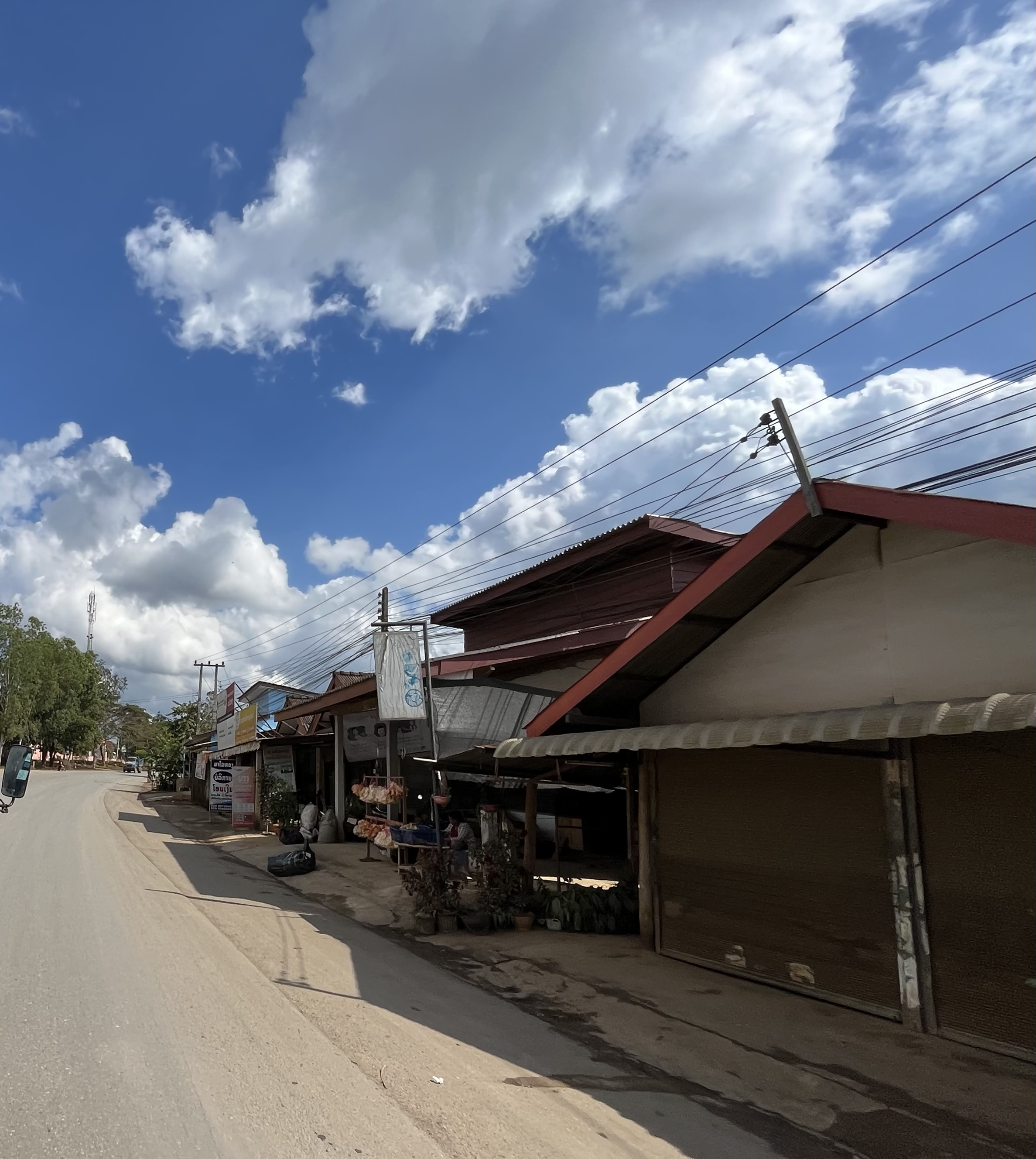

- Location within Laos
- Coordinates: 20°41′N 101°4′E
- Country: Laos
- Province: Luang Namtha
- District: Viengphoukha District
- Time zone: UTC+7 (ICT)

Vieng Phouka, (also Vien Pou Kha Vieng, Viangphoukha, Viengphoukha, Vieng Pou Kha, Vien Pouka) is a town in Luang Namtha Province, northeastern Laos, approximately 50 kilometres southwest of the town of Luang Namtha. It is the capital of Viengphoukha District. The town was affected by the 2007 Laos earthquake, the epicentre only being several kilometres to the southwest.

== Landmarks ==
The area surrounding the town is heavily forested and isolated, with dramatic mountain scenery in the distance and part of the Namtha National Biodiversity Conservation Area. The main river in the area is the Nam Fa River. In the southwestern part of the town is Bor Kung Nature Park, known for its shrimp and crab ponds and the Wat Bor Kung. The other temple of note is Wat Ban Thio in the northeast of the town. The town also contains a hospital, guesthouse, tourist office, morning market, bank, police station, and bus station.
