= Bokeo Nature Reserve =

Protected area in Bokeo Province, Laos

Coordinates: 20.51352°N 100.64950°E

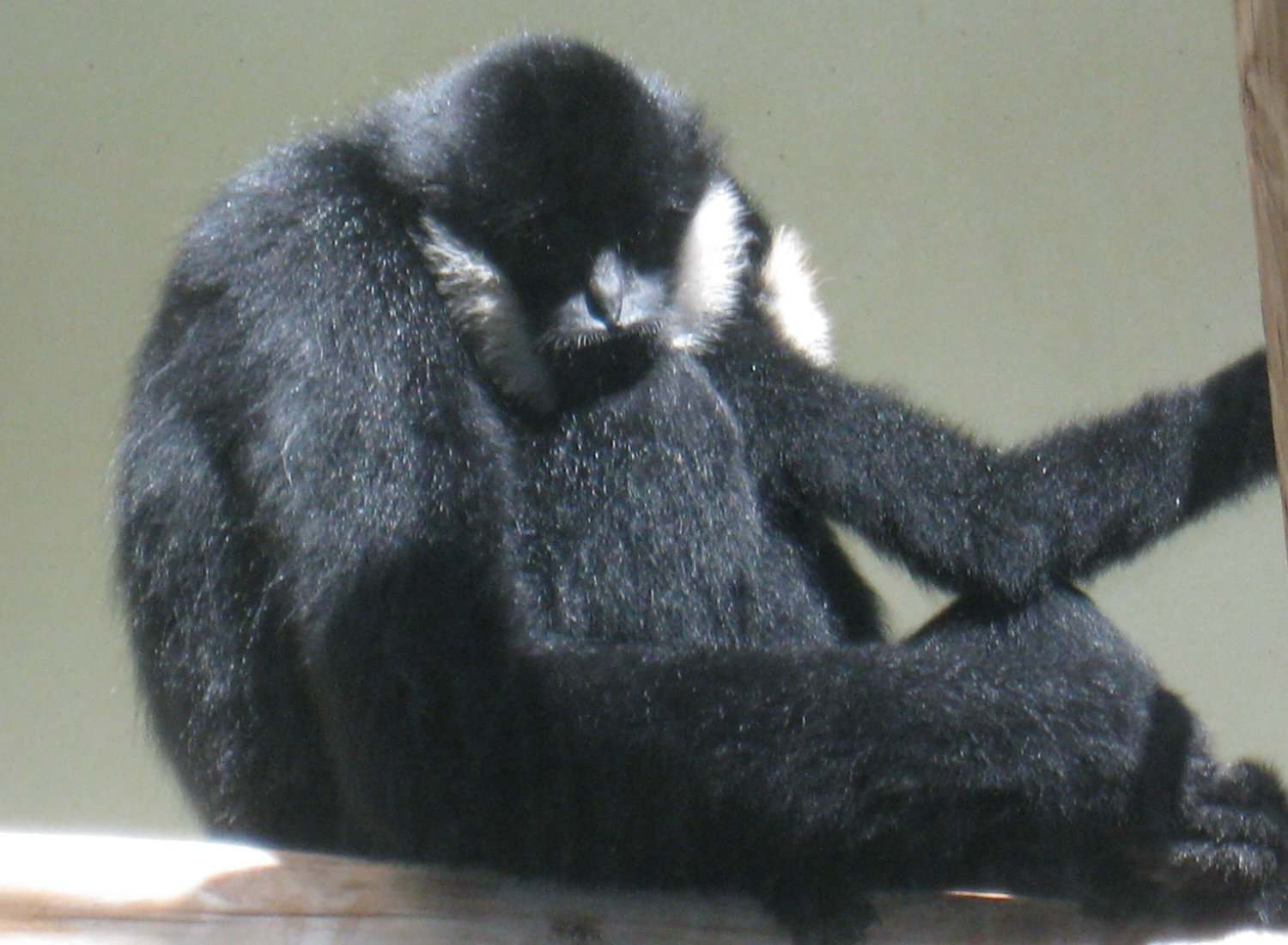
Male black-cheeked Gibbon an endangered species

Nam Kan National Protected Area (NPA) (formerly Bokeo Nature Reserve) is located in Bokeo Province, Laos. The protected area was created to protect its population of the black-crested gibbon, discovered in 1997 which was previously thought to be extinct. The protected area, 475 square miles (1,230 km^{2}) in size, is characterized by a mix-deciduous forest and mountainous terrain (elevation ranging from 500-1500m).

Asian elephants and wild water buffalo migrate through the reserve; bears and tigers are also present.

Gibbon Experience is a conservation project which came into existence after the indigenous black crested gibbon was discovered. This experience is provided in the Bokeo Nature Reserve. The conservation program has two components, one is of Gibbon viewing huts, known as canopy huts (there are four such very large huts, well turned out with all facilities) in the vast forest reserve meant to view the black crested gibbons and the second component is to experience the beauty of the rain forests at the canopy level. Another experience is of the Waterfall Gibbon Experience which involves 3 hours of trekking to the location, deep in the reserve traversing along the Nam Nga River.
