= Pak Tha district =

Pak Tha district ເມືອງປາກທາ
- District
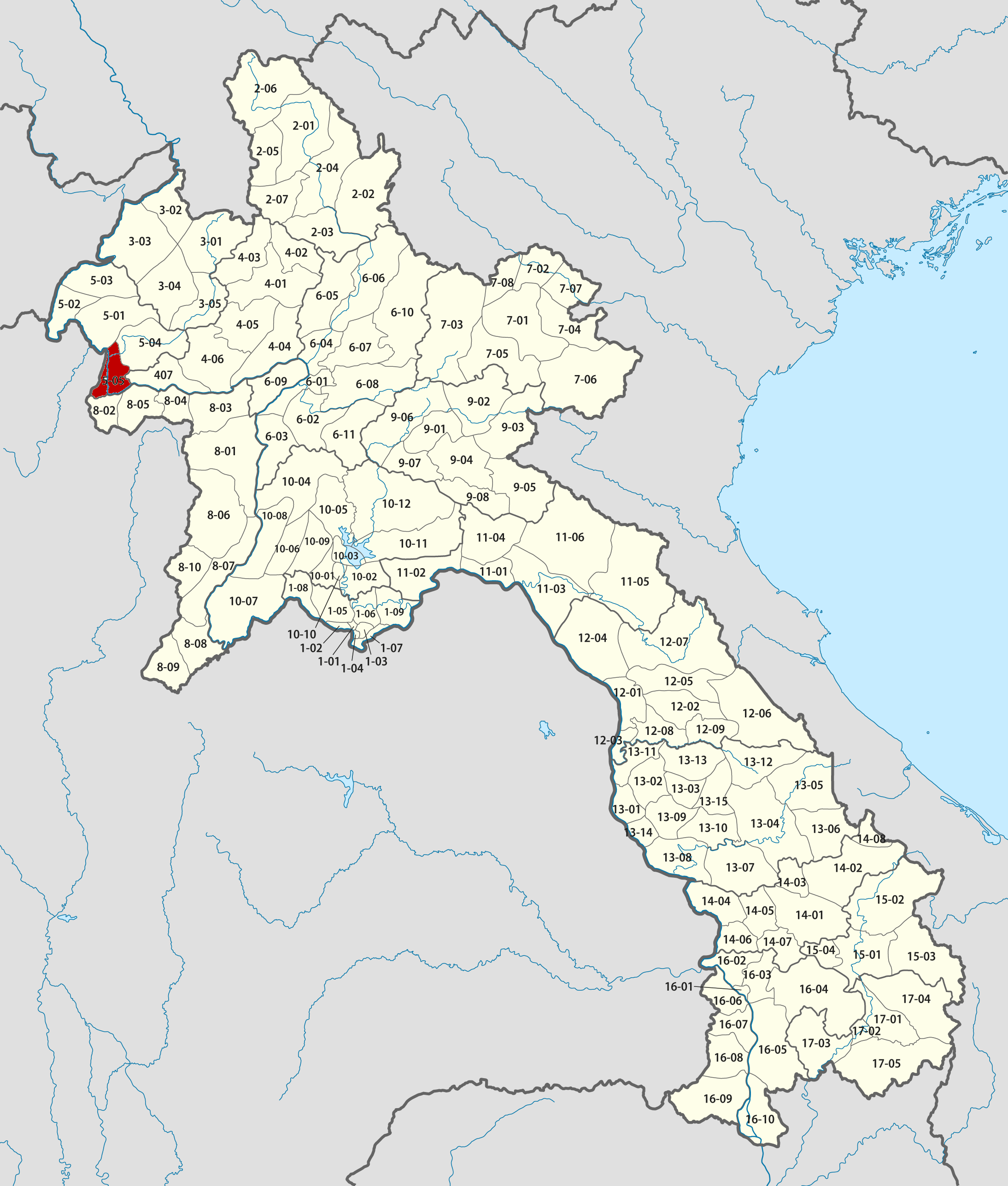
- Location in Laos
- Country: Laos
- Province: Bokeo province
- Time zone: UTC+7 (ICT)

Pak Tha is a district (muang) of Bokeo province in northwestern Laos.
