= Viengphoukha district =

Viengphoukha district ເມືອງວຽງພູຄາ
- District
- Interactive map of Viengphoukha district
- Country: Laos
- Province: Luang Namtha province

Population (2015)
  - Total: 23,928
- Time zone: UTC+7 (ICT)

Viengphoukha is a district (muang) of Luang Namtha province in northwestern Laos.

== Settlements ==
- Vieng Phouka (capital)
