= Pierre Busée =

Pierre Busée (Petrus Busaeus, Buys) (born at Nijmegen in 1540; died at Vienna in 1587) was a Dutch Jesuit theologian. He assisted in producing the Jesuit Ratio Studiorum and the catechism of Peter Canisius.

== Life ==
When twenty-two years old he entered the novitiate of the Society of Jesus at Cologne where six years later (1567) he became master of novices. In addition to this office he was appointed to give religious instruction to the upper classes in the Jesuit college at Cologne.

In 1671 Busée left Cologne and went to Vienna, where he lectured on Scripture in the university and taught Hebrew at the Jesuit college. In 1584 Busée went to Rome at the directive of the General of the Society, Claudio Acquaviva, who had appointed him a member of a commission to draw up a system or plan of studies (Ratio Studiorum) for the entire Society. On his return to Vienna, Busée was made Rector of the College of Nobles and died while holding this position.

== Works ==
He undertook to complete the large catechism of Peter Canisius by adding to it the full text of the scriptural and patristic references cited by the author. Peter Canisius himself encouraged this undertaking. The first volume appeared at Cologne in 1569, under the title Authoritates sacræ Scripturæ et sanctorum Patrum, quæ in summa doctrinæ christianæ doctoris Petri Canisii citantur.

The following year, 1570, the work was completed, and was received at once with much favor. It consists of four volumes; for some unknown reason the last volume is lacking in the edition of the catechism, with notes by Busée, which was issued in 1571 by the house of Manutius of Venice, the descendants of Aldus Manutius. In 1577, a new edition revised and augmented by another Jesuit, Jean Hase, was published at Cologne in one folio volume, under another title: Opus catechisticum ... D. Petri Canisii theologi S.J. præclaris divinæ Scripturæ testimoniis, sanctorumque Patrum sententiis sedulo illustratum operâ D. Petri Busæi Noviomagni, ejusd. Soc. theologi, nunc vero primum accessione novâ locupletatem atque restitutum.
