= Antoine-Joseph Mège =

French Benedictine of the Congregation of St. Maur

Antoine-Joseph Mège (1625 at Clermont – 15 April 1691, at the monastery of St. Germain-des-Prés near Paris) was a French Benedictine of the Congregation of St. Maur. He is known for his commentary on the early 6th-century book of precepts, the Rule of St. Benedict.

== Life ==
On 17 March 1643, he became a Benedictine at the monastery of Vendôme. In 1659 he taught theology at the Abbey of St. Denis and afterwards devoted himself to preaching.

In 1681 he was made prior of the monastery at Rethel in Champagne. Towards the end of his life, he withdrew to St. Germain-des-Prés, where he divided his time between prayer and study.

== Works ==
His most important literary production is "Commentaire sur la règle de S. Benoît" ("Commentary on the Rule of St. Benedict") and a manuscript history of the congregation of St. Maur from 1610 till 1653 (Paris, 1687). This commentary is an attack upon the rigoristic interpretation of the rule by Abbot Rancé of La Trappe, and was forbidden in 1689 by a chapter of the Maurist superiors at the instance of Bossuet.

His other works are a translation of St. Ambrose's treatise "On Virginity" (Paris, 1655), "La Morale chrétienne" (Paris, 1661), a few ascetical writings and translations.
