= Louis Jouin =

German Jesuit linguist, philosopher and author

Louis Jouin (14 June 1818 – 10 June 1899) was a German Jesuit linguist, philosopher, and author.

== Life ==
Jouin was born in Berlin. He was descended from a French Huguenot family, which had been forced by the Edict of Nantes to take refuge in Prussia. After spending some time in a French school he went to Poland, where he entered the Catholic Church, and determined to embrace the priesthood. He secured his release from military service, renounced allegiance to the land of his birth, and made his way to Rome.

He was admitted into the Society of Jesus, entering the novitiate of San Andrea, 20 August 1841. He studied philosophy for three years in the Jesuit Roman Colleges. He then and worked for a time at Reggio Emilia, where he was ordained priest on 30 April 1848.

He was forced by the Revolution of 1848 to flee the country. Accordingly, in October 1848 he went to the United States, remaining in New York City till 1852, and then studied theology at Fordham University from 1852 to 1856, taught in Fordham College until 1859, and spent the following year at Sault-au-Recollet, Canada. Returning to Fordham in 1860, he taught theology to those preparing for the priesthood (1860-3), and later (1866–72) filled various positions in the college.

After a visit to England in 1872, he went to Guelph, Ontario, remaining there until 1875. During 1875-6 he was in Montreal and during 1876–9 at St. Francis Xavier in lower Manhattan. In 1879 he returned to Fordham, where he remained until his death twenty years later.

As a lecturer he occupied in Italy, Canada, and the United States the chairs of science, mathematics, and theology; but it was to teaching philosophy that he gave the best part of the fifty-eight years he spent in the Society of Jesus. Jouin was an accomplished linguist, speaking with fluency German, French, Italian, Spanish, English, Polish, and Latin, besides being well versed in Greek, Hebrew, and Gaelic. He was a skilled moralist, and for many years presided over the theological conferences of the Archdiocese of New York.

== Works ==
For the use of his students, he prepared, either in lithograph or in print, various treatises on philosophical and scientific subjects. Only a few of these were given to the public. His published works are:

- Elementa Logicae et Metaphysicae (4th ed., New York, 1884)
- Elementa Philosophiae Moralis (New York, 1886)
- "Evidences of Religion" (1877)
- "Logic and Metaphysics"
- "What Christ Revealed"
