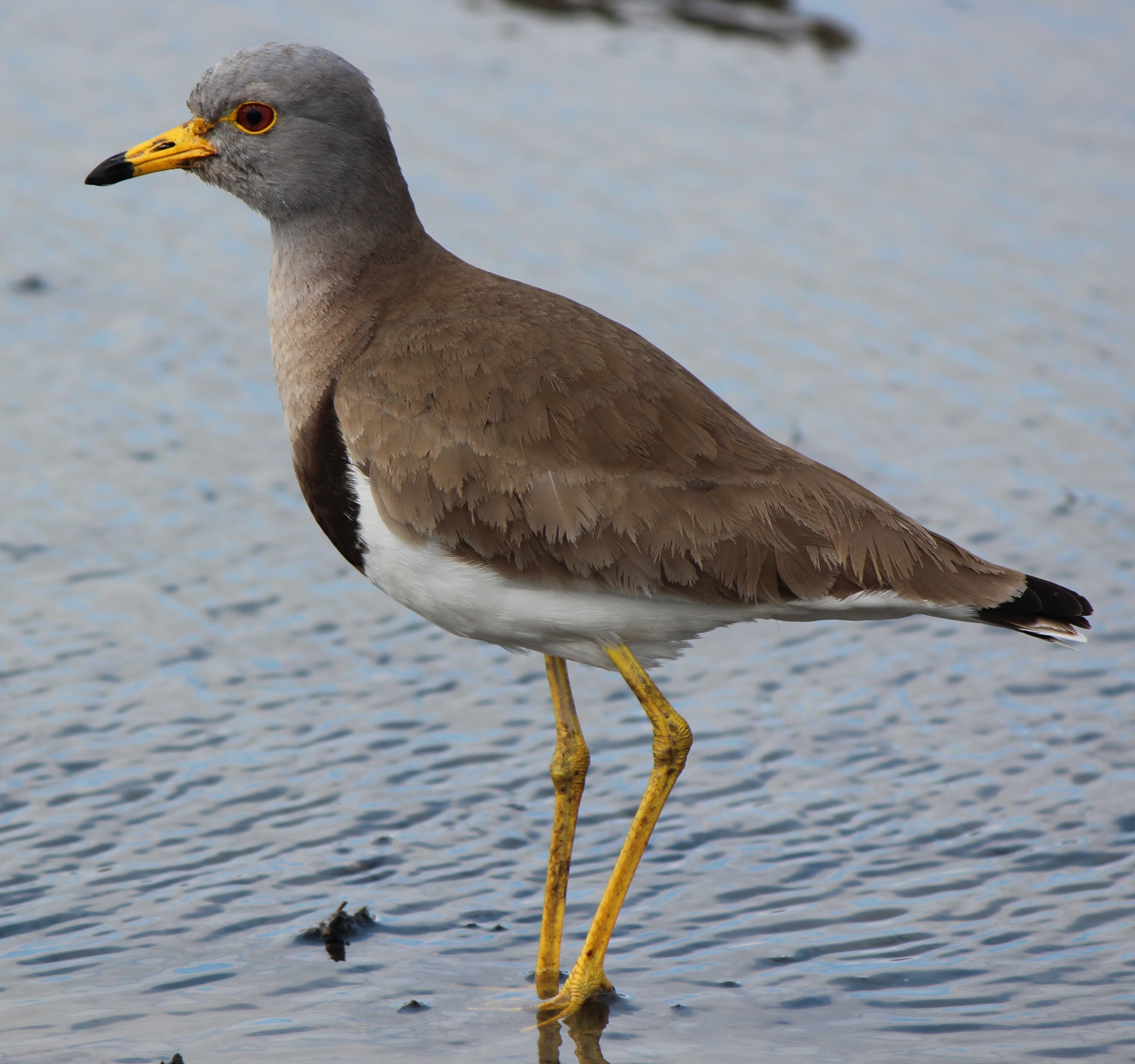

Conservation status
- Least Concern (IUCN 3.1)

Scientific classification
- Kingdom: Animalia
- Phylum: Chordata
- Class: Aves
- Order: Charadriiformes
- Family: Charadriidae
- Genus: Vanellus
- Species: V. cinereus

Binomial name
- Vanellus cinereus (Blyth, 1842)

Synonyms
- Hoplopterus cinereus (Blyth, 1842); Microsarcops cinereus (Blyth, 1842); Pluvianus cinereus Blyth, 1842

= Grey-headed lapwing =

Species of bird

The grey-headed lapwing (Vanellus cinereus) is a lapwing species which breeds in northeast China and Japan. The mainland population winters in northern Southeast Asia from northeastern India to Cambodia. The Japanese population winters, at least partially, in southern Honshū.

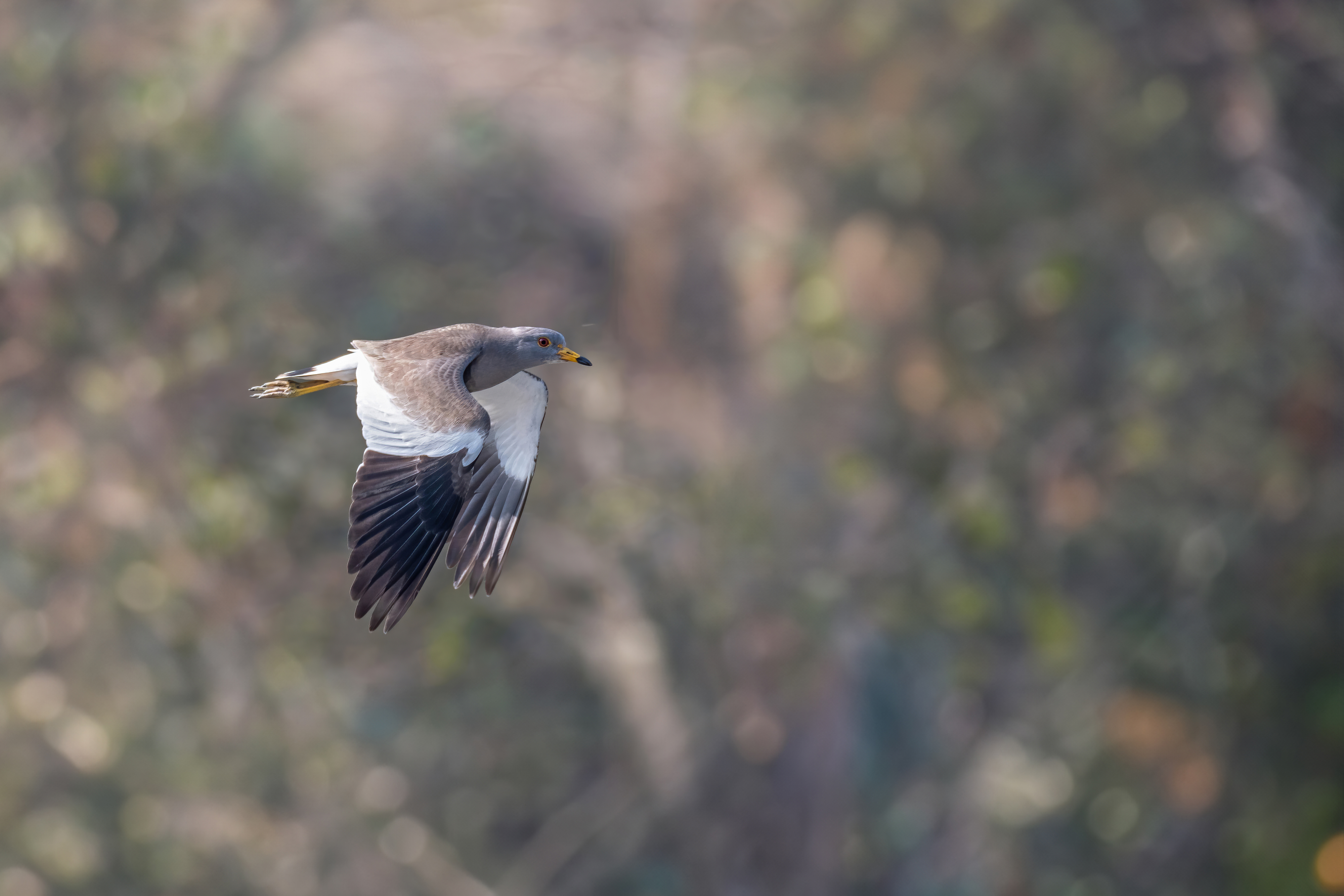
In flight at Kathmandu Valley, Nepal.

This species has occurred as a vagrant in Russia, the Philippines, Indonesia, New South Wales, Australia, Telangana and Sri Lanka, as well as Sweden and England.

== Description ==
The grey-headed lapwing is 34–37 cm long. It has a grey head and neck, darker grey breast band and white belly. The back is brown, the rump is white and the tail is black. This is a striking species in flight, with black primaries, white under wings and upper wing secondaries, and brown upper wing coverts.

Adults of both sexes are similarly plumaged, but males are slightly larger than females. Young birds have the white areas of plumage tinged with grey, a less distinct breast band, and pale fringes to the upperpart and wing covert feathers. The call of the grey-headed lapwing is a sharp chee-it.

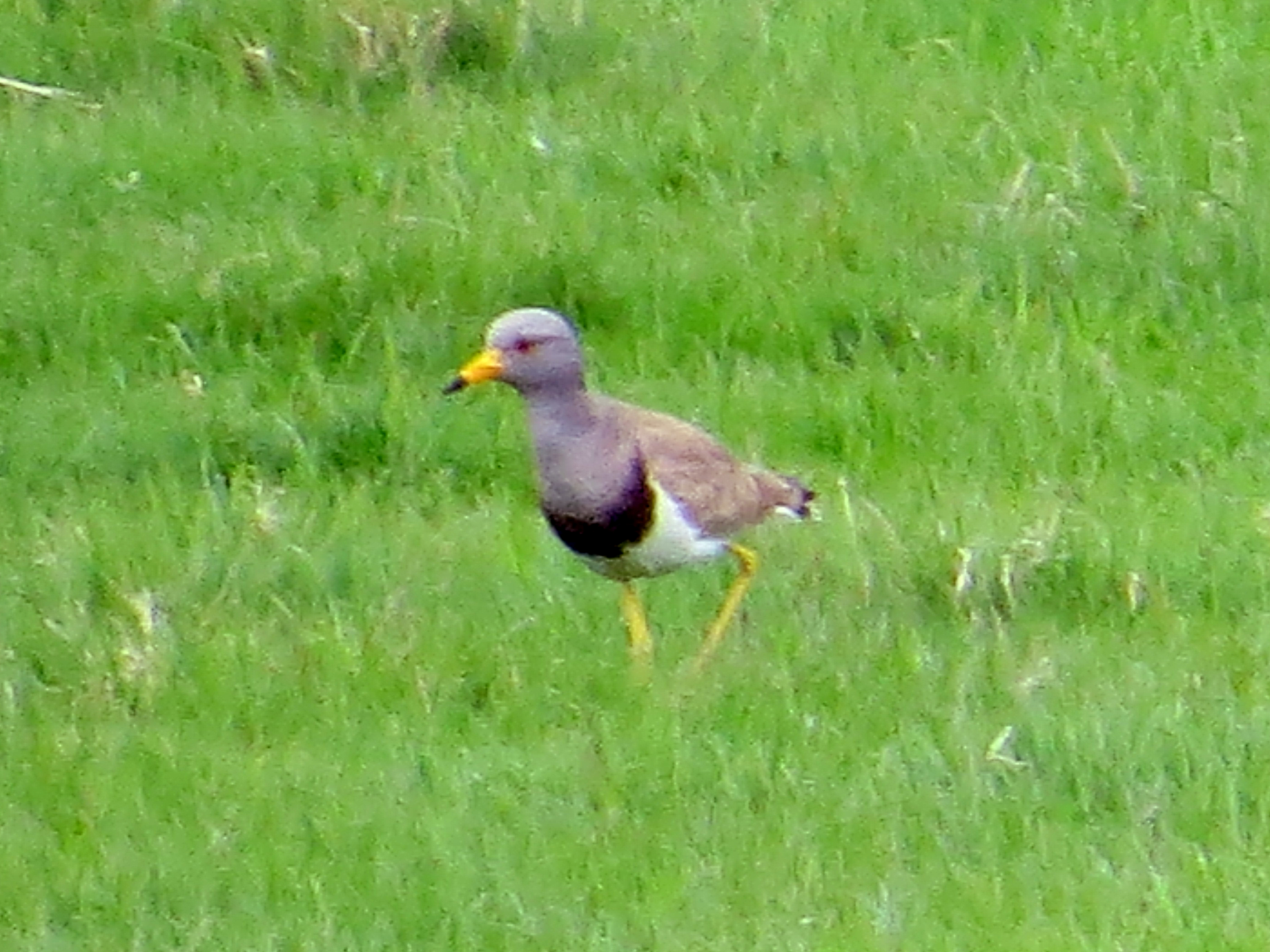
The first grey-headed lapwing seen in Britain was on 1 May 2023 at Newton-by-the-Sea in Northumberland.

== Behaviour ==
This species nests from April to July in wet grassland, rice fields and marshland edges. It winters in similar habitat and is then gregarious. It feeds in shallow water on insects, worms and molluscs.
