= Pius Melia =

Italian theologian and Jesuit

Pius Melia (b. at Rome, 12 January 1800; d. in London, June 1883) was an Italian Jesuit theologian.

== Life ==
Melia entered the Society of Jesus on 14 August 1815, taught literature at Reggio, and afterwards was engaged in preaching. He left the Society in 1853.

He wrote several books and was known for his controversy with Antonio Rosmini-Serbati and his doctrine on original sin; Melia's book repudiating this doctrine was answered by Rosmini (Milan, 1841) and Pagani (Milan, 1842); then began a bitter controversy which had to be ended by a direct command of Pope Pius IX.

== Works ==
His works include:

- "Alcune ragioni del P. Pio Melia della C. di G." (Lucca, 1847), a defence of the Society of Jesus
- Doctrines of St. Thomas Aquinas on the Rulers and Members of Christian States Extracted and Explained (1864)
- The Origin, Persecutions And Doctrines Of The Waldenses (1870)
- "Alcune affirmazioni del Sig. Antonio Rosmini-Serbati" (Pisa, s. d.), an attack upon Antonio Rosmini-Serbati.
- Hints and facts on the origin of man and of his intellectual faculties

In his Life of Rosmini, William Lockhart declares that Alcune affirmazioni del Sig. Antonio Rosmini-Serbati was not written by Melia, but by other Italian Jesuits; Augustin de Backer, in his "Dictionnaire des Antonymes", attributed it to Passaglia, but his "Bibliothèque de la Compagnie de Jésus", re-edited by Carlos Sommervogel, follows Paolo Beorchia who attributes it to Melia.
