= Luis de Lossada =

Spanish Jesuit theologian and philosophical writer

Luis de Lossada (1681–1748) was a Spanish Jesuit theologian and philosophical writer.

Lossada was born at Quiroga, Galicia, Spain. He entered the Society of Jesus in 1698, and, after completing his studies, taught theology, Scripture, and philosophy at Salamanca, where he died.

== Works ==
His first publication was the Vida y virtudes del P.G. Dutari (1720). One year later he published his Institutiones dialecticae, commonly styled Summulae. This book was an introduction to his Cursus philosophici Regalis Collegii Salmanticensis, in tres partes divisus, which he published in 1724 (last edition, 10 vols., Barcelona, 1883). It discusses all the branches of philosophy.

Lossada generally follows Suárez, though in some points he departs from his master. Urráburu was an admirer of Lossada's egregium et gravissimum cursum (Institutiones philosophicae, I, 8777), and followed him very closely.

Lossada took part in the discussion on the descent of Saint Dominic, and his learned writings on this point were published by the Bollandists in their Acta Sanctorum of 1755.

The satirical vein in Lossada's works led him to be credited with José Francisco de Isla's novel Fray Gerundio de Campazas. Lossada and Isla wrote together the amusingly absurd work La juventúd triunfante.
