= Domenico Palmieri =

Italian Jesuit scholastic theologian

Domenico Palmieri (Piacenza, Italy, 4 July 1829 – Rome, 29 May 1909) was an Italian Jesuit scholastic theologian.

== Life ==
He studied in his native city, where he was ordained a priest in 1852. On 6 June 1852, he entered the Society of Jesus, where he completed his studies. He taught in several places, first rhetoric, then philosophy, theology, and the Sacred Scriptures. In these courses, especially during the sixteen years that he was professor in the Roman College, he acquired a reputation as a philosopher.

On the election of Cardinal no:Andreas Steinhuber in 1893, Palmieri was appointed to succeed Steinhuber as theologian of the Apostolic Penitentiary.

== Works ==
In philosophy, he published: "Animadversiones in recens opus de Monte Concilii Viennensis" (Rome, 1878) and "Institutiones Pbilosophicæ" (3 vols., Rome, 1874–76). In the latter he followed the scholastic method; but the doctrines in many points differ from those common to the Peripatetic philosophers. As regards the composition of bodies, he admits the dynamic theory, and considers the first elements of bodies to be formally simple, endowed with an attractive and repulsive force, but which he says are virtually extended. On the other hand, he does not admit the real accidents, and to explain the permanence of the Communion bread, he has recourse to the phenomena of ether, which persist by Divine operation, the substance of bread and wine ceasing to exist.

He held a conception altogether his own of the life of plants, and assigned simple souls to animals, which expire with their death. As regards the origin of the idea, he was true to the scholastic principles in admitting that the intellectual apprehension has its origin in the apprehension of the senses; but to his last day would not admit the necessity of the intelligible species.

In Scriptural study also he made his mark. Having taught the Holy Scriptures from 1880 to 1887, and Semitic languages to the scholastics of his society in Maastricht, he published "Commentarius in epistolam ad Galatas" (Gulpen, 1886); and "De veritate historica libri Judith aliisque ss. Scripturarum locis specimen criticum exegeticum" (Gulpen, 1886). Many others of his minor works can be placed under this head. When Alfred Loisy's book, "L'Evangile et l'Eglise", appeared, he was one of the first to attack it, in a treatise in the form of letters. He examined more minutely another work of Loisy's, "Autour d'un Petit Livre", in his "Esame di un opuscolo che gira intorno ad un piccolo libro". To this demonstration he joins a more complete one, on the Synoptic Gospels, also treated in "Se e come i sinottici ci danno Gesù Cristo per Dio" (Prato, 1903). Only the first part of this book, concerning the Gospel of St. Matthew, was published.

Palmieri's reputation, however, rests principally on his theology in the Roman College:

- "Tractatus de Romano Pontifice cum prolegomeno de Ecclesia" (3rd ed., Prato, 1902)
- "Tractatus de Pœnitentia" (2nd ed., Prato, 1896)
- "Tractatus de Matrimonio Christiano" (2nd ed., Prato, 1897)
- "Tractatus de Gratia Divina Actuali" (Gulpen, 1885)
- "Tractatus Theologicus de Novissimis" (Prato, 1908)
- "Tractatus de Creatione et de Præcipuis Creaturis" (Prato, 1910)
- "Tractatus de Ordine Supernaturali et de Lapsu Angelorum" (Prato, 1910)
- "Tractatus de Peccato Originali et de Immaculato Beatæ Virginis Deiparæ Conceptu" (Prato, 1904)

The last three treatises here, taken together, form a new edition in many parts perfected and rearranged from his former treatise on God the Creator, printed first in Rome, 1878. The third part was published before the other two, because the author wished with it to render homage to the Immaculate Conception on the fiftieth anniversary of the proclamation of the dogma.

In his treatise on creation and the special creatures, a posthumous work, but of which he left the manuscript completed and prepared, the change made by him regarding the union of the soul with the body, because while he first asserted that the union was only natural and not substantial, now that it is Church teaching that the human nature consists entirely in the synthesis of two elements, that is to say, of the body and of the reasoning soul, he admits that this union is substantial, although he asserts that it is not yet sufficiently determined how one nature can result from these two elements.

The originality of his theological works consists principally in the method which he followed, which amounts to an exhaustive demonstration of the existence of a teaching, and in its scholastic exposition and defence, so that his treatises are almost complete from the positive, scholastic, and polemic viewpoints. Antonio Ballerini left at his death a collection of studies in moral theology. It was in the form of a commentary on the Medulla of Busenbaum, but not complete. Palmieri undertook the task of putting in order this work and made many additions of his own.

These works were followed by a commentary on the Divine Comedy of Dante Alighieri, a work undertaken by him at the suggestion of his mother, Giuseppina Rocci Palmieri.
