= François Delfau =

François Delfau (born 1637 at Montel in Auvergne, France; died 13 October 1676, at Landevenec in Normandy) was a French Benedictine theologian, an authority on patristic theology.

== Life ==
He joined the Order of St. Benedict when he was seventeen years of age, and made his solemn profession at the Abbey of St. Allire, 2 May 1656. He was a student of the Fathers of the Church and the history of the councils.

When the Congregation of St. Maur in 1670 determined to undertake a critical edition of the works of Augustine of Hippo, Delfau was commissioned by his superiors to prepare it. Together with six other members of the order, among them his intimate friend Robert Guérard, he began the task. In 1671 he prepared an elaborate prospectus, setting forth the general scope and character of the new edition and the principles by which the editors were to be guided.

Manuscripts came to the Maurists from various countries, and Pope Clement X sent them codices from the Vatican Library, together with all the materials that had been gathered there under Pope Clement VIII for a projected edition of the Opera Augustini. When the first two volumes were about to be printed, the work was suddenly arrested, on 18 September 1675, by two lettres de cachet from Louis XIV, decreeing the banishment of both Delfau and Guérard from Paris. The occasion for this drastic measure seems to have been Delfau's book "L'abbé commendataire", published at Cologne, 1673, in which the young monk had commented on the abuses connected with the system of commendatory abbots as it was then in France.

Delfau was obliged to withdraw to Landévennec Abbey; he lived there but little more than a year when, at the early age of thirty-eight, he was drowned as he was crossing to the Carmelite convent at Brest, where he was to deliver a eulogy on the feast-day of St. Teresa.

== Works ==
Delfau's works are:

- "Apologia Cardinalis Fürstenbergii"; an epitaph on Casimir, King of Poland, who died as Abbot of St. Germain des Prés;
- a dissertation on the authorship of the Imitatio Christi, in his edition of that book (Paris, 1673).
