= Nicholas Abram =

French Jesuit theologian and classicist

Nicholas Abram (1589 – 7 September 1655) was a Jesuit theologian and classicist.

== Biography ==
Abram was born in Xaronval, in Lorraine, in the year 1589. He entered the Jesuit order in 1606, and took his final vows in 1623.

Abram taught rhetoric at Pont-à-Mousson. Later he engaged in missionary work, and finally taught theology at Pont-à-Mousson from 1636 until 1653. Before returning to Pont-à-Mousson, he taught briefly at Dijon. He died in Pont-à-Mousson at 1655.

== Works ==
His principal works are:

- Nonni Panopolitani Paraphrasis Sancti secundum Joannem Evangelii. Accesserunt Notae P.N.A., Soc. Jes. (Paris, 1623);

Commentarii in P. Virgilii Maronis Bucolica et Georgica. Accessit diatriba de quatuor fluviis et loco paradisi (Pont-à-Mousson, 1633–35);

- Pharus Veteris Testamenti, sive sacrarum quaestionum libri XV. Quibus accesserunt ejusdem auctoris de veritate et mendacio libri IV (Paris, 1648).

His other works may he found in Carlos Sommervogel, Bibliothèque de la compagnie de Jésus (Brussels, 1890). They include:

- Epitome Praeceptorum Graecorum Versibus Latinis comprehensorum (Pont-à-Mousson, 1612)
- Theophrastus, sive De Quatuor Fluviiset Loco Paradisi Diatriba ad Explicationem Versus 290. Libri IV. Georgicon (Pont-à-Mousson, 1635)
- Commentarius in tertium volumen Orationum Ciceronis (Paris, 1631)
- Dispositio Analytica aliquarum Orationum Ciceronis brevibus Tabulis comprehensa (Pont-à-Mousson, 1633)
- Epitome Rudimentorum Linguae Hebraicae Versibus Latinis breviter et dilucide comprehensa (Paris, 1645)
- Dissertatio de Tempore Habitationis Filiorum Israel in Egypto
- Pharus Veteris Testamenti, sive Sacrarum Quaestionum, libri xv.; accesserunt de Veritate et Mendacio, libri iv (Paris, 1648)
- Axiomata Vitae Christianae (Pont-à-Mousson, 1654)
- L'Université de Pont-à-Musson (Paris, 1870)
- a commentary on the epistles of St. Paul (unfinished manuscript)
