= Sigismund von Storchenau =

Austrian Catholic priest and philosopher

Sigismund Maria Laurentius von Storchenau SJ (14 August 1731 – 13 April 1797) was an Austrian Catholic priest, philosopher and theologian.

== Biography ==
Storchenau was born at Köttmannsdorf in Carinthia. He entered the Society of Jesus in 1747, and became professor of philosophy in Vienna in 1762. In the years 1781–90, he was court preacher to Archduchess Maria Anna of Austria at Klagenfurt.

Storchenau wished to promote the works of the philosopher Christian Wolff in Catholic nations, in a similar way as many German Jesuits of that time (e.g. Leopold Biwald and Roger Joseph Boscovich).

== Works ==
- Institutiones logicae (1769)
- Institutiones metaphysicae (1769)
- Grundsätze der Logik (1774)
- Die Philosophie der Religion (1773–81)
- Zugaben (1785–89)
- Tractatus de religione et theologia naturali (1786)
- L. J. Spittler's Grundriß der christlichen Kirchengeschichte (1790)
- Seltenere Urkunden aus dem inneren Archive der Religionsphilosophie (1791)
- Der Glaube der Christen, wie er sein soll (1792)
- Die Moral des Christen, wie sein soll, in geistlichen Reden (1793–96)
- Sermones sacri in omnes totius anni dominicas (1806)
