= Fernando Castro Palao =

Spanish Jesuit theologian (1581–1633)

Fernando Castro Palao (b. at León in 1581; d. at Medina, 1 December 1633) was a Spanish Jesuit theologian.

== Life ==
At the age of fifteen, in 1596, he entered the Society of Jesus. He taught philosophy at Valladolid, moral theology at Compostela, and scholastic theology at Salamanca.

Later he became rector of the College of Medina, and consultor and qualificator of the Holy Inquisition. He filled these three offices until his death.

== Theologian ==
He excelled as a moral theologian; his classes of moral theology were attended by a greater number of students than were ever known to follow the course at Compostella. His decisions were regarded as oracles, and difficult cases were submitted to him for solution. Alphonsus Liguori numbers him among the principal authorities on moral theology (Dissert. schol. mor., Naples, 1755, c. iv, n. 119) and Jean-Pierre Gury calls him "a probabilist, a most learned, wise, erudite, and prolific author."

== Works ==
His "Opus Morale" comprises seven volumes, and covers in the same number of treatises, the whole field of moral theology. It appeared first at Lyon, 1631–51; its fifth edition is dated 1700. A general index to the whole work is found in the fourth volume of this last edition, and also in the third edition, which appeared at Venice in 1721.

Immediately after his death (1633) there appeared at Valladolid a meditation book written by him, entitled, "Manual del Cristiano de varias consideraciones para el exercico santa de la oracion." The first part of this work contains meditations on the end of man; the second treats of the life of Christ and his Blessed Mother; the third considers God and his relationship to humanity.

An English translation of a letter of Castro Palao on the death of Thomas White appeared in The Month for 1890 (vol. 69, pp. 91–93).
