= Felix Körner =

German theologian and Islam scientist

Felix Körner SJ (born 26 January 1963 in Offenbach am Main) is a German theologian and Islamic studies scholar. He has been described as one of the leading scholars of Islamic studies in the Catholic Church.

== Life & career ==
Körner graduated with a high-school degree at the Leibnizschule in Offenbach in 1982, followed by civil services and an internship. In 1985 he joined the Jesuits and from 1987 to 1989 he studied philosophy at the Munich School of Philosophy. From 1992 to 1995 Körner studied catholic theology at Heythrop College of the University of London and from 1997 until 2001 Islam sciences and turkology at Bamberg University, leading to a PhD with a thesis on modern Turkish theologians of the ankaran school in 2003 in the group of Rotraud Wielandt. Between 2004 and 2010 he studied at the University of Fribourg in the group of Barbara Hallensleben while receiving a PhD in theology with a thesis on the intersection between Catholicism and Islam and a habilitation on theology of the religions.

Since then, he has published on topics of Quran exegesis and hermeneutics in Turkey. On October 7, 1995, Körner was ordained priest by auxiliary bishop Paul Wehrle. He lived in Ankara from 2002 until 2008 and taught at the Sankt Georgen Graduate School of Philosophy and Theology. From 2008 until 2019 he was professor for theology of the religions and dogmatic theology at the Pontifical Gregorian University. In 2008 and 2011, Körner participated at the first and second seminar of the Catholic-Muslim Forum. From 2012 until 2017, he became a member of the pontifical commission for religious relations to Muslims. In 2019 and 2020, Körner was a fellow at the Wissenschaftskolleg zu Berlin. Since 2021 he is the Nicolaus Cusanus professor at the department of theology of the religions of the Zentralinstitut für Katholische Theologie (IKT) of the Humboldt-Universität in Berlin.

== Publications (selection) ==
- Revisionist Koran Hermeneutics in Contemporary Turkish University Theology: Rethinking Islam. Würzburg, 2005.
- Richard Heinzmann, Mualla Selçuk, Felix Körner (ed.): Menschenwürde. Grundlagen in Christentum und Islam. Symposion der Eugen-Biser-Stiftung und der Islamisch-Theologischen Fakultät der Universität Ankara am 3. und 4. Oktober 2005 (Interkulturelle und interreligiöse Symposien der Eugen-Biser-Stiftung; Bd. 1). Kohlhammer, Stuttgart 2007, ISBN 978-3-17-020169-9 (German, Turkish).
- Kirche im Angesicht des Islam. Dissertation Freiburg 2007, Kohlhammer, Stuttgart 2008, ISBN 978-3-17-020559-8.
- Alter Text – neuer Kontext. Herder, Freiburg im Breisgau 2006 (series of the Georges-Anawati-Foundation Religion and Society; 1), ISBN 978-3-451-23114-8.
- Politische Religion. Theologie der Weltgestaltung – Christentum und Islam. Herder, Freiburg im Breisgau 2020, ISBN 978-3-451-38646-6.
- Tuba Işık, Felix Körner: Glaube in die Gegenwart kommen lassen: Predigt. In Handbuch christlich-islamischer Dialog 2024.
