= Jean-Baptiste Terrien =

French Jesuit dogmatic theologian

Jean-Baptiste Terrien (born at Saint-Laurent-des-Autels, Maine-et-Loire, 26 August 1832; d. at Bellevue, near Paris, 5 December 1903) was a French Jesuit dogmatic theologian.

== Life ==
Terrien entered the Society of Jesus at Angers, 7 December 1854. Beginning in 1864, he taught philosophy and dogmatic theology at the seminary of Laval, France. In 1880, the Jesuits were expelled from France under the Third Republic, and the Laval seminary relocated to Saint Helier, Jersey. Terrien continued in his position there until 1888.

Terrien was appointed professor of dogmatic theology at the Catholic Institute of Paris, where he taught from 1891 to 1894. Afterwards, he remained in this city as spiritual father and writer.

== Works ==
During his first period of teaching, he did not publish any theological work, except a treatise, "De Verbo incarnato", Jersey, 1882, for private circulation; there are also five or six other treatises in manuscript or lithographed, which form a substantial body of Positive rather than Scholastic theology, after the manner and doctrine of Johann Baptist Franzelin.

In a quite different style is framed a neo-Thomistic monograph, published at Paris in 1894: "S. Thomæ Aquinatis, O.P., doctrina sincera de unione hypostatica Verbi Dei cum humanitate amplissime declarata". At this time, Terrien began to write more popular works, and published the following doctrinal treatises in French:

- La Dévotion au Sacré-Coeur de Jésus, d'après les documents authentiques et la théologie, 1893; Italian translation by G. M. Rossi (Naples, 1895);
- La grâce et la gloire ou la filiation adoptive des enfants de Dieu étudiée dans sa réalité, ses principes, son perfectionnement, et son couronnement final, 2 vols., 1897; new ed., 1908;
- La Mère de Dieu et la Mère des hommes d'après les Pères et la théologie, 4 vols., 1900, 1902.

Philosophically, Terrien was more sympathetic to Thomism than to the school of Francisco Suárez.
