= Bokeo province =

Smallest and least populous province of Laos

Bokeo province ແຂວງ ບໍ່ແກ້ວ
- Province
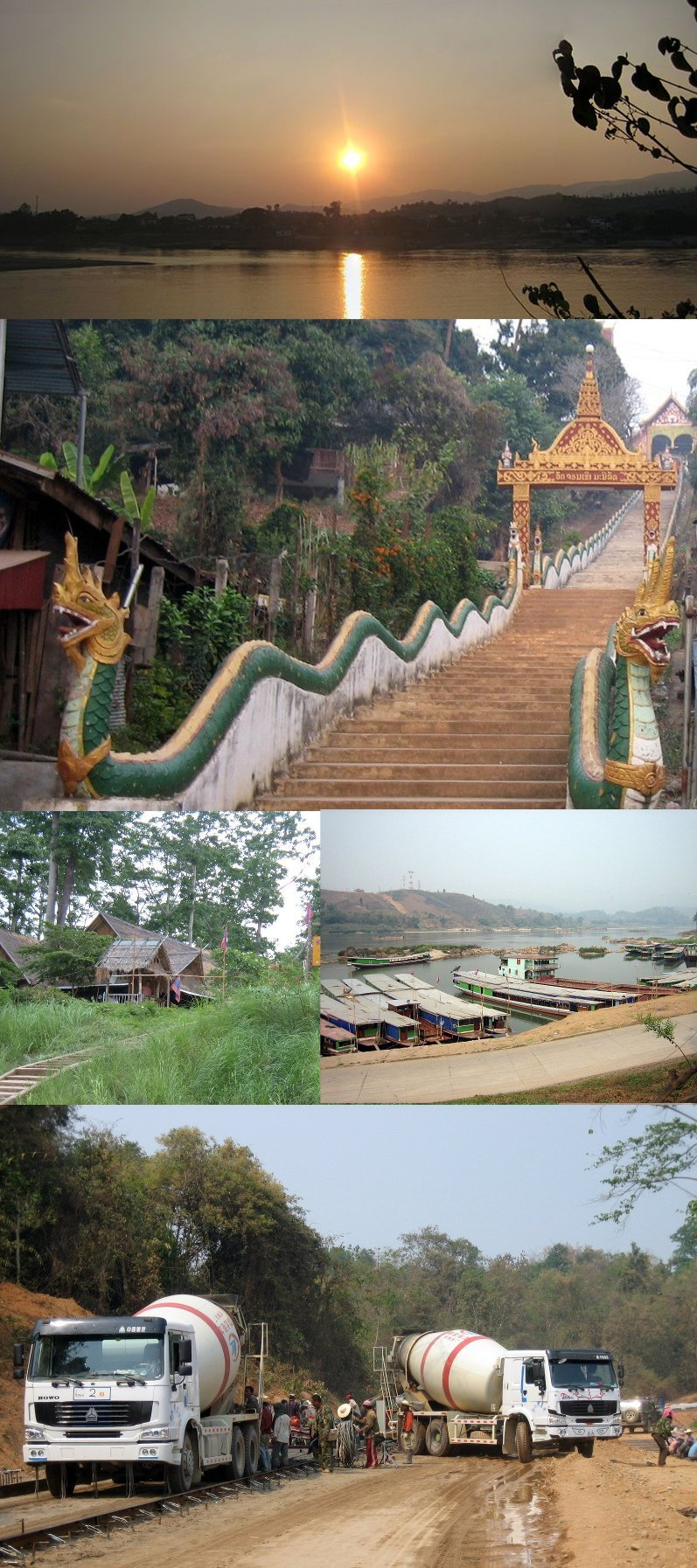

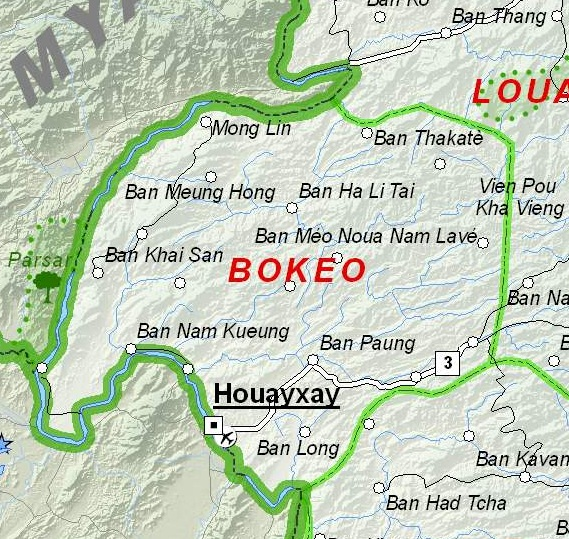
- Map of Bokeo province

- Location of Bokeo province in Laos
- Coordinates: 20.3°N 100.417°E
- Country: Laos
- Capital: Ban Houayxay

Area
  - Total: 6,196 km^{2} (2,392 sq mi)

Population (2020 census)
  - Total: 203,468
  - Density: 32.84/km^{2} (85.05/sq mi)
- Time zone: UTC+7 (ICT)
- ISO 3166 code: LA-BK
- HDI (2022): 0.592 medium · 12th

Bokeo (Lao: ບໍ່ແກ້ວ, pronounced [bɔ̄ː kɛ̂ːw]; literally 'gem mine'; previously, Hua Khong, meaning 'head of the Mekong') is a northern province of Laos. It is the smallest and second least populous province in the country. Bokeo has five districts: (Houay Xay, Tonpheung, Meung, Phaodom, and Paktha) and the Golden Triangle Special Economic Zone in Ton Pheung district. Bokeo's provincial capital is Houayxay on the Mekong River. The province is in the Golden Triangle, at the border of Myanmar and Thailand.

== Geography ==
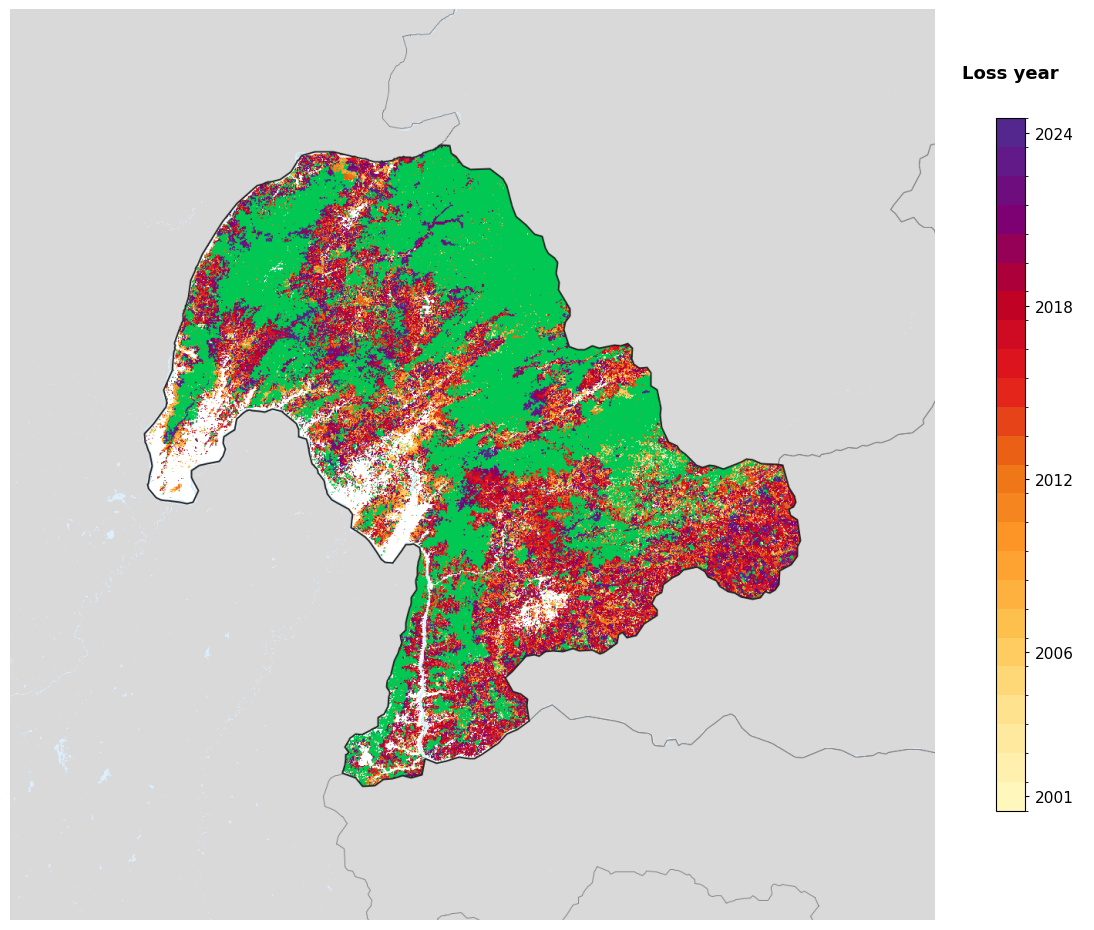
Tree-cover loss year in Bokeo, 2001-2024, from the Global Forest Change dataset.

Bokeo province is the smallest of the country's provinces, covering an area of 6,196 square kilometres (2,392 sq mi). Settlements include Houayxay, Mong Lin, Ban Thakate, Ban Meung Hong, Ban Ha Li Tai, Ban Khai San, Ban Nam Kueng, Ban Long and Ban Paung. The Nam Nga River flows through the province's Bokeo Nature Reserve, and is hemmed between the Mekong River bordering Thailand and Burma and is on the trade route with China. Don Sao is an island in Tonpheung District, which is connected to the mainland except during the rainy season.

=== Protected areas ===
The Bokeo Nature Reserve was created as protection for the black crested gibbon (also known as "black cheeked gibbon"), discovered in 1997, previously thought to be extinct. Elephants and wild water buffalo migrate through the reserve; bears and tigers are present. The protected area is characterized by a mixed deciduous forest and mountainous terrain (elevation ranging between 500 and 1500 m).

The Gibbon Experience, funded by the French entrepreneur Jean Francois Reumaux, is a conservation project that came into existence after the indigenous black cheeked gibbon was discovered. The project has two components: one is four gibbon viewing huts, known as canopy huts in the forest reserve, meant to allow viewing of the black cheeked gibbons, and the second component is to experience the rain forest at canopy level. The Waterfall Gibbon Experience involves three hours of hiking to the location, in the reserve following the Nam Nga River. Other than gibbons, other wildlife reported to live in the reserve are: great barbet (Megalaima virens); grey-headed parakeet (Psittacula finschii); grey leaf monkeys (Semnopithecus); crab-eating mongoose (Herpestes urva), tiger (Panthera tigris); smaller cats; dhole (Cuon alpinus), bears (two types); otters; sambar (Cervus unicolor); and wild cattle (gaur).

The 10,980 hectare Upper Lao Mekong Important Bird Area (IBA) stretches across the provinces of Bokeo, Oudomxay, and Sainyabuli. It is at an elevation of 300–400 metres (980–1,310 ft). The topography features river channels, exposed beds, sandbars, sand and gravel bars, islands, rock outcrops, bushland, and braided streams. Confirmed avifauna include black-bellied tern (Sterna acuticauda), great cormorant (Phalacrocorax carbo), grey-headed lapwing (Vanellus cinereus), Jerdon's bush chat (Saxicola jerdoni), brown-throated martin (Riparia paludicola), river lapwing (Vanellus duvaucelii), small pratincole (Glareola lactea), and swan goose (Anser cygnoides).

=== Administrative divisions ===
The province includes the following districts:

Map	Code	Name	Lao script	Population (2015)
	5-01	Houayxay	ເມືອງຫ້ວຍຊາຍ	70,170
	5–02	Ton Pheung	ເມືອງຕົ້ນເຜິ້ງ	34,476
	5–03	Meung	ເມືອງເມິງ	14,506
	5–04	Pha Oudom	ເມືອງຜາອຸດົມ	40,909
	5–05	Pak Tha	ເມືອງປາກທາ	19,182

== History ==
Bokeo was named after the sapphires mined in Houayxay District. A stele dated 1458 is found in the Wat Jom Kao Manilat, a pagoda built in 1880 of teak in Shan architectural style. Fort Carnot, a historical artifact of the French colonial empire, was used by the Laotian army post-independence as a barracks until its abandonment in the 20th century.

The province was created in 1983, when it was split off from Luang Namtha province. In 1992, Paktha and Pha Oudom Districts were reassigned from Oudomxay province. Houayxay town was a marked crossroad trading centre between Yunnan province of China and Thailand, particularly for Chinese goods.

== Demographics ==
Its population was 179,243 in 2015, in 36 townships, and more than 400 villages. Most numerous ethnic groups are the Lanten, Hmong, Lahu, Yao, Akha, and Tai Lue peoples. The Lahu, a Tibeto-Burman speaking people who are part of ethnic group of northern Myanmar and Thailand inhabit this province.

== Economy ==
The provincial economy includes the Golden Triangle Special Economic Zone (GT SEZ). In 2007, Kings Romans Group, owned by Chinese husband-and-wife pair Zhao Wei and Su Guiqin, entered into a 99-year lease for 10,000 hectares on the banks of the Mekong. The company was granted 3,000 of these hectares as a duty-free zone, which later became the SEZ. As gambling is illegal in China, and the SEZ is a two-hour journey by road from the Chinese border crossing at Boten, casinos and hotels catering near-exclusively to a Chinese clientele were built. An industry involving trafficking in endangered animals has grown up around the Chinese tourist trade. In January 2018, the US Treasury Department announced sanctions against what it called Zhao's transnational criminal organisation, engaging in illicit activities, including human trafficking and child prostitution, drug trafficking and wildlife trafficking.

Houayxay, the capital city of the province, has most of the remainder of the province's economic activity. The province is one of the maize producing areas of Laos. Commercial mining for stones and gold is an economic activity. Ban Nam Khok and Ban Houi Sala, about 6 kilometres (3.7 mi) and 18 kilometres (11 mi) from Bokeo town respectively, are mining areas. Buhae Industrial Corp., which mines for sapphires, is a company operating in Houayxay District. Some of the ethnic Lantaen villages are noted for their production of saa paper and other crafts.

Paa beuk, a catfish, the largest freshwater fish in the world, is found in the Mekong River. It grows to 3 metres (9.8 ft) in length and can weigh up to 300 kg.

== Landmarks ==
There are temples in the capital city of Houayxay, including Wat Jom Khao Manilat (constructed in 1880), Wat Thadsuvanna Pkakham (with eight gilded Buddhas), Wat Khonekeo Xaiyaram (with red, gold, and green doors and pillars), and Wat Keophone Savanthanaram (with a reclining Buddha behind chicken wire). The ruins of Fort Carnot, built by the French in the 1900s, is a colonial military installation, and was designated as a local-level National Heritage Site in 2025.
