= Matthieu Petit-Didier =

French Benedictine theologian and ecclesiastical historian

Matthieu Petit-Didier (18 December 1659, Saint-Nicolas-de-Port, Lorraine, – 17 June 1728, Senones) was a French Benedictine theologian and ecclesiastical historian.

== Life ==
After studying at the Jesuit college at Nancy he joined the Benedictine Congregation of St-Vannes, in 1675, at the monastery of St-Mihiel. In 1682 he was appointed professor of philosophy and theology.

In 1699 he was canonically elected Abbot of Bouzonville, but could not take possession because the Duke of Lorraine had given the abbey in commendam to his own brother. He was elected Abbot of Senones in 1715, but got possession only after a lengthy dispute with another claimant. He became president of his congregation in 1723.

== Works ==
Two years later Pope Benedict XIII appointed him Bishop of Macra in partibus infidelium. In reward for his timely "Traité théologique sur l'autorité et l'infaillibilité des papes" (Luxemburg, 1724). The work was forbidden in France and Lorraine by the Parliaments of Paris and Metz; it was translated into Italian (Rome, 1746); and into Latin by Gallus Cartier, O.S.B. (Augsburg, 1727, it is printed also in Migne, "Cursus theol.", IV, 1141–1416). The work was especially pleasing to the pope, because Petit-Didier, after the Declaration of the French Clergy in 1682, had formerly been an appellant from the Constitution Unigenitus.

The remaining works of Petit-Didier are. "Remarques sur la Bibliothèque ecclésiastique de M. Dupin" (Paris, 1691–93), in which he points out many errors; "Dissertation historique et théologique dana laquelle on examine quel a été le sentiment du Concile de Constance et des principaux Théologiens qui y ont assisté, sur l'autorité du pape et sur son infaillibilité" (Luxemburg, 1724), in which the author defends the opinion that the decree of the Council of Constance concerning the superiority of a general council over the pope was intended only for the time of a schism; "Dissertationes historicæ, criticæ, chronologicæ in Sacram Scripturam Veteris Testamenti" (Toul, 1699); "Justification de la morale et de la discipline de Rome et de toute l'Italie" (1727), a reply to an anonymous treatise entitled: "La morale des Jésuites et la constitution Unigenitus comparée à la morale des payens".

== Jean-Joseph Petit-Didier ==
His brother Jean-Joseph Petit-Didier, a Jesuit theologian and canonist, was born at Saint-Nicolas-du-Port in Lorraine, on 23 October 1664; and died at Pont-à-Mousson, on 10 August 1756. Entering the Society of Jesus, 16 May 1683, he was professed 2 February 1698, and taught belles-lettres, philosophy, and canon law at Strasburg from 1694 to 1701, and theology at Pont-à-Mousson from 1704 to 1708.

About 1730 he became the spiritual director of Duchess Elizabeth-Charlotte of Lorraine. A few years later he returned to the Jesuit house at Saint-Nicolas where he spent the remainder of his life.

His chief works are: "De Justitia, jure et legibus" (Pont-à-Mousson 1704); "Remarques sur la théologie du R. P. Gaspard Juenin" (1708), a refutation of the Jansenistic errors of Juenin; "Les Saints enlevez et restituez aux Jesuites" (Luxemburg, 1738), concerning Saints Francis Xavier and John Francis Regis; "Traité de la clôture des maisons religieuses de l'un et de l'autre sexe" (Nancy, 1742); "Recueil de Lettres critiques sur les Vies des Saints du Sieur Baillet" (Cologne, 1720); "Les prets par obligation stipulative d'interest usités en Lorraine et Barrois" (Nancy, 1745), a canonical treatise; "Sancti Patris Ignatii de Loyola exercitia spiritualia tertio probationis anno per mensem a Patribus Societatis Jesu obeunda" (Prague, 1755; Paris, 1889).
