= Hermann Busenbaum =

German Jesuit casuist

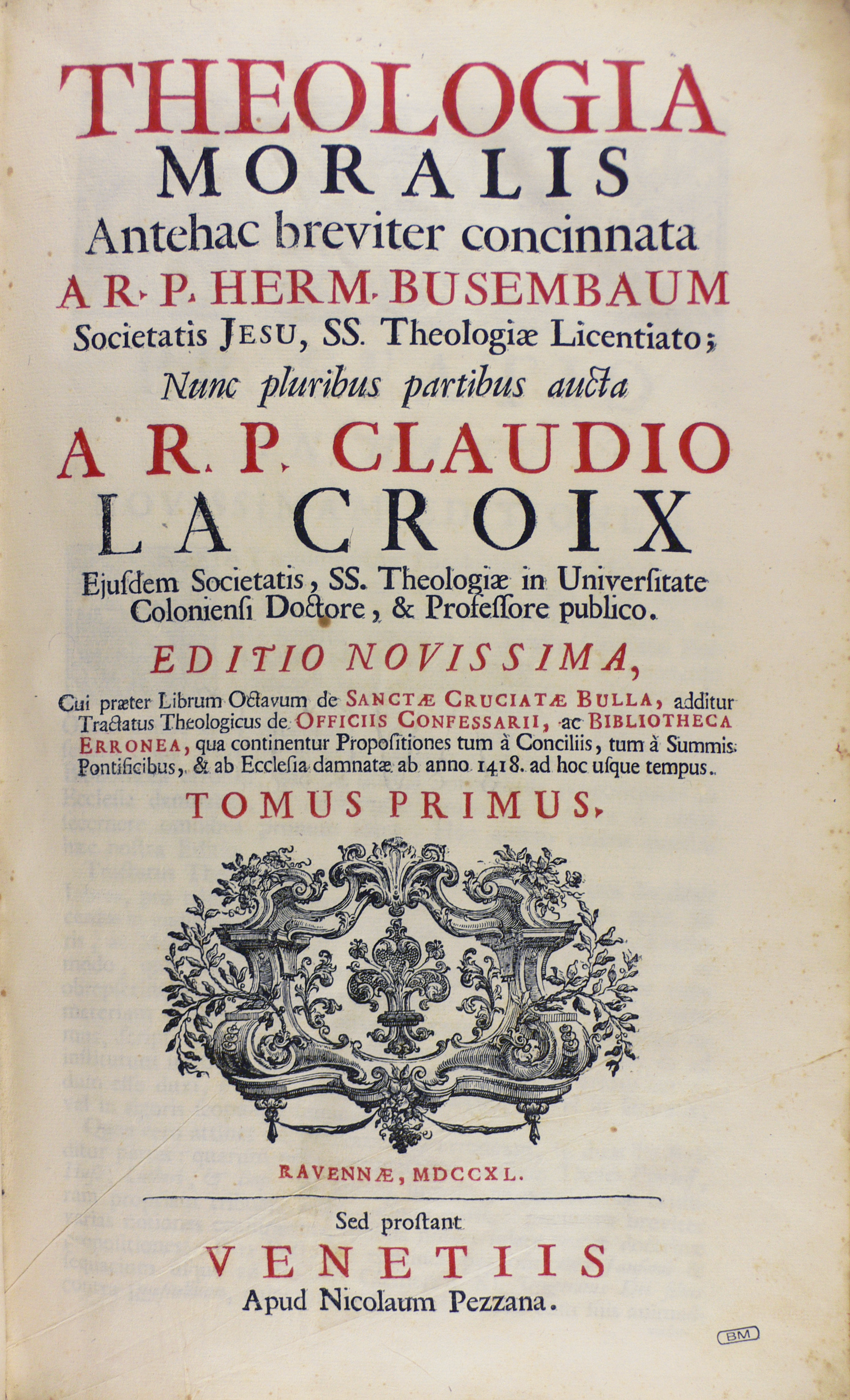
Theologia moralis, 1740 (Milano, Fondazione Mansutti).

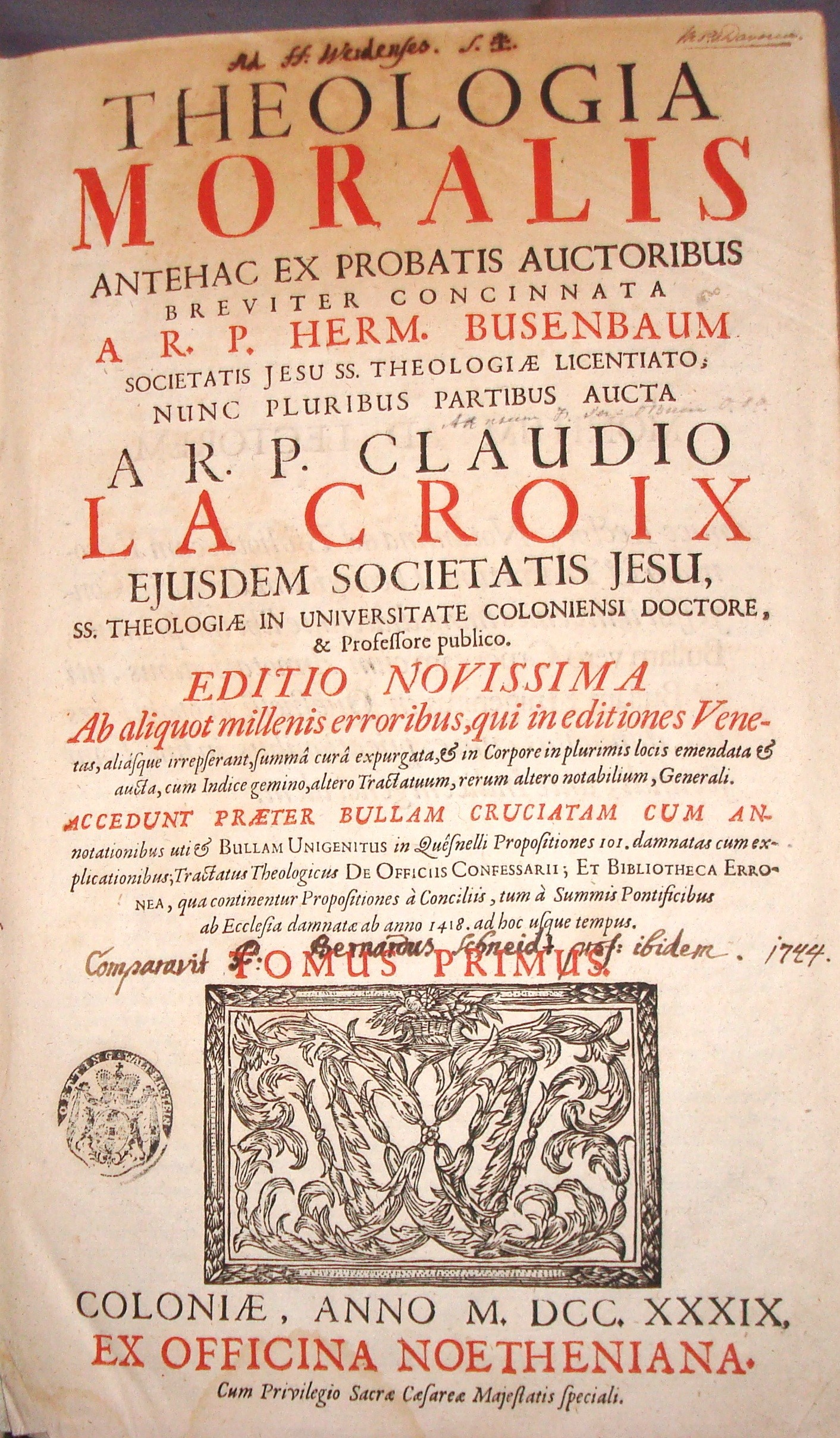

Hermann Busenbaum (or Busembaum) (19 September 1600 – 31 January 1668) was a Jesuit theologian. He attained fame as a master of casuistry.

== Biography ==
He was born at Nottuln in Westphalia (Germany). He entered the Jesuit order in 1619, and taught scholastic and moral theology in Cologne. He became rector of the Jesuit college at Hildesheim and then at Münster, where he died on 31 January 1668, being at the time father-confessor to Bishop Christoph von Galen.

== Medulla ==
His book Medulla theologiae moralis, facili ac perspicua methodo resolvens casus conscientiae (1645) grew out of his lectures to students at Cologne. The manual obtained a wide popularity and passed through over two hundred editions before 1776. Although less bold in its declarations than some other Jesuit books, such as, for example, the Defensio Fidei (1613) of Francisco Suarez, it was the most complete and systematized in its exposition, and served as a type for succeeding treatises of the sort.

The theology of Medulla was generally well received within the Catholic Church. The book was published in all the major European centers of Catholicism and was widely used in seminaries as a manual on practical moral theology for 200 years. It received positive commentary from theologians including St. Alphonsus de Liguori, a Doctor of the Church.

The book met no significant opposition until Claude Lacroix (1652–1714) added considerably to its bulk. His editions in two folio volumes appeared in both Germany (1710–1714) and France (1729). In these editions, the sections on murder and especially on regicide were much amplified, and in connection with Damiens' attempt on the life of Louis XV the book was severely handled by the parlement of Paris. At Toulouse in 1757, though the offending sections were repudiated by the heads of the Jesuit colleges, the Medulla was publicly burned, and the episode undoubtedly led the way to the duc de Choiseul's attack on the Jesuits.

== Other writings ==
Busenbaum also wrote a book on the ascetic life, Lilium inter spinas.
