= Catholic dogmatic theology =

Catholic dogmatic theology can be defined as "a special branch of theology, the object of which is to present a scientific and connected view of the accepted doctrines of the Christian faith".

== Definition ==
According to Joseph Pohle, writing in the Catholic Encyclopedia, "theology comprehends all those and only those doctrines which are to be found in the sources of faith, namely Scripture and Tradition...For, just as the Bible ... was written under the immediate inspiration of the Holy [Spirit], so Tradition was, and is, guided in a special manner by God, Who preserves it from being curtailed, mutilated, or falsified." The scientific character of dogmatic theology does not rest so much on the exactness of its exegetical and historical proofs as on the philosophical grasp of the content of dogma.

The functions of dogmatic theology are twofold: first, to establish what constitutes a doctrine of the Christian faith, and to elucidate it in both its religious and its philosophical aspects; secondly, to connect the individual doctrines into a system. "In current Catholic usage, the term 'dogma' means a divinely revealed truth, proclaimed as such by the infallible teaching authority of the Church, and hence binding on all the faithful without exception, now and forever."

== Subjects ==
Dogmatic theology begins with the doctrine of God, whose existence, essence, and attributes are to be investigated. A philosophical understanding of the dogma of the Trinity was attempted by the Fathers. The theologian investigates the activity of creation. As the beginning of the world supposes creation out of nothing, so its continuation supposes Divine conservation, which is nothing less than a continued creation. However, God's creative activity is not thereby exhausted. The topics of Original Sin and angelology come under Creation.

The subject of redemption includes Christology, Soteriology, Mariology. The Redeemer's activity as Mediator stands out most prominently in His triple office of high priest, prophet, and king. For the most part, dogmatic theologians prefer to treat Mariology and the veneration paid to relics and images under Eschatology, together with the Communion of Saints.

A structured approach to the role of dogmatic theology in the education of clergy was put forward by the Second Vatican Council in its Decree on Priestly Training (1965):

Dogmatic theology should be so arranged that [the] biblical themes are proposed first of all. Next there should be opened up to the students what the Fathers of the Eastern and Western Church have contributed to the faithful transmission and development of the individual truths of revelation. The further history of dogma should also be presented, account being taken of its relation to the general history of the Church. Next, in order that they may illumine the mysteries of salvation as completely as possible, the students should learn to penetrate them more deeply with the help of speculation, under the guidance of St. Thomas, and to perceive their interconnections. They should be taught to recognize these same mysteries as present and working in liturgical actions and in the entire life of the Church. They should learn to seek the solutions to human problems under the light of revelation, to apply the eternal truths of revelation to the changeable conditions of human affairs and to communicate them in a way suited to men of our day.

== History ==
=== Patristic period (about A.D. 100–800) ===
At the outset, Christian dogmatic theology comprised apologetics, doctrinal and moral theology, and canon law. The Fathers of the Church are honoured by the Church as her principal theologians. It was not so much in the catechetical schools of Alexandria, Antioch, and Edessa as in the struggle with the great heresies of the age that patristic theology developed. This serves to explain the character of the patristic literature, which is apologetical and polemical, parenetical and ascetic. It was not the intention of the Fathers to give a systematic treatment of theology. It may be said in general that the apologetic style predominated up to the time of Constantine the Great.

Christian writers had to explain the truths of natural religion, such as God, the soul, creation, immortality, and freedom of the will; at the same time they had to defend the chief mysteries of the Christian faith. The efforts of the Fathers to define and combat heresy brought writings against Gnosticism, Manichæism, and Priscillianism. Those who wrote against pagan polytheism include: Justin Martyr, Lactantius, and Eusebius of Cæsarea. Prominent writers against the practices of Judaizing Christians include Hippolytus of Rome, Epiphanius of Salamis, and Chrysostom. At the First Council of Nicaea, the Church took steps to define revealed doctrine more precisely in response to a challenge from a heretical theology.

Eastern Christians in this dispute on the Trinity and Christology included the Alexandrines, and Didymus the Blind; Athanasius and the three Cappadocians; Cyril of Alexandria and Leontius of Byzantium; and Maximus the Confessor. In the West the leaders were: Cyprian, Jerome, Fulgentius of Ruspe, Pope Leo I and Pope Gregory I. As the contest with Pelagianism and Semi-pelagianism clarified the dogmas of grace and liberty, providence and predestination, original sin and the condition of our first parents in Paradise, so also the contests with the Donatists brought codification to the doctrine of the sacraments (baptism), the hierarchical constitution of the Church her magisterium or teaching authority, and her infallibility. A culminating contest was decided by the Second Council of Nicæa (787).

These developments left the dogmatic teachings of the Fathers as a collection of monographs rather than a systematic exposition. Irenæus shows attempts at synthesis; the trilogy of Clement of Alexandria (d. 217) marks an advance in the same direction. Gregory of Nyssa (d. 394) then endeavoured in his "Large Catechetical Treatise" (logos katechetikos ho megas) to correlate in a broad synthetic view the fundamental dogmas of the Trinity, the Incarnation, and the Sacraments. In the same manner, though somewhat fragmentarily, Hilary of Poitiers (d. 366) developed in his work "De Trinitate" the principal truths of Christianity.

The catechetical instructions of Cyril of Jerusalem (d. 386) especially his five mystagogical treatises, on the Apostles' Creed and the three sacraments of Baptism, Confirmation, and the Holy Eucharist, contain an almost complete dogmatic treatise. Ambrose (d. 397) in his chief works: "De fide", "De Spiritu S.", "De incarnatione", "De mysteriis", "De poenitentia", treated the main points of dogma in classic Latin, though without any attempt at a unifying synthesis. Augustine of Hippo (d. 430) wrote one or two works, as the "De fide et symbolo" and the "Enchiridium", which are compendia of dogmatic and moral theology, as well as his speculative work De Trinitate.

Cyril of Alexandria was a model for later dogmatic theologians on the topics of Trinity and Christology.

Towards the end of the Patristic Age, Isidore of Seville collected the writings of Western church fathers in his Libri III sententiarum seu de summo bono, and John Damascene did the same in the East with his Fons scientiae.

==== Other notable theologians of the period ====
- Arnobius
- Athenagoras of Athens
- Commodianus
- Firmicius Maternus
- Hermias
- Ignatius of Antioch
- Minucius Felix
- Polycarp
- Pope Clement I
- Prudentius
- Tatian
- Theophilus of Antioch

=== Middle Ages (800–1500) ===
==== Beginning of Scholasticism (800–1200) ====
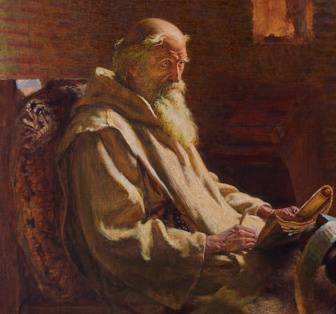
Venerable Bede

The scope of the scholastic method is to analyze the content of dogma by means of dialectics. Scholasticism did not take its guidance from John Damascene or Pseudo-Dionysius, but from Augustine. Augustinian thought runs through the whole progress of Western Catholic philosophy and theology. The Venerable Bede (d. 735), is the link which joins the patristic with the medieval history of theology.

Up to the time of Anselm of Canterbury, the theologians were more concerned with preserving than with developing the writings of the Fathers. The beginnings of Scholasticism may be traced back to the days of Charlemagne (d. 814). Theology was cultivated nowhere with greater industry than in the cathedral and monastic schools, founded and fostered by Charlemagne. The earliest signs of a new approach appeared in the ninth century in the work of Paschasius Radbertus, and Rabanus Maurus. These speculations were carried to a greater depth by (Lanfranc, Hugh of Langres, etc.).

Anselm of Canterbury (d. 1109) was the first to bring a sharp logic to bear upon the principal dogmas of Christianity, and to draw up a plan for dogmatic theology. Taking the substance of his doctrine from Augustine, Anselm, as a philosopher, was not so much a disciple of Aristotle as of Plato, in whose dialogues he had been schooled.

The renowned mystics, Bernard of Clairvaux, and Bonaventure, were at the same time distinguished Scholastics. It is upon the doctrine of Anselm and Bernard that the Scholastics of succeeding generations took their stand, and it was their spirit which lived in the theological efforts of the University of Paris.

The first attempts at a theological system may be seen in the so-called Books of Sentences, collections and interpretations of quotations from the Fathers, more especially of Augustine. One of the earliest of these books is the Summa sententiarum, an anonymous compilation created at the School of Loan some time after 1125. Another is The Sacraments of the Christian Faith written by Hugh of St. Victor around 1135. His works are characterized throughout by a close adherence to Augustine and may serve as guides for beginners in the theology of Augustine. Peter Lombard, called the "Magister Sententiarum" (d. 1164), stands above them all. What Gratian had done for canon law Lombard did for dogmatic and moral theology. He sifted and explained and paraphrased the patristic lore in his "Libri IV sententiarum", and the arrangement which he adopted was, in spite of the lacunæ, so excellent that up to the sixteenth century his work was the standard text-book of theology. The work of interpreting this text began in the thirteenth century, and there was no theologian of note in the Middle Ages who did not write a commentary on the Sentences of Lombard. No other work exerted such a powerful influence on the development of scholastic theology.

William of Auvergne (d. 1248), who died as bishop of Paris, deserves special mention. Though preferring the free, unscholastic method of an earlier age, he yet shows himself at once an original philosopher and a profound theologian. Inasmuch as in his numerous monographs on the Trinity, the Incarnation, the Sacraments, etc., he took into account the anti-Christian attacks of the Arabic writers on Aristotelianism, he is the connecting link between this age and the thirteenth century.

===== Other notable theologians of the period =====
- Alain of Lille (d, 1203)
- Alger of Liège
- Gaufridus
- Guitmund
- Peter of Poitiers (d. 1205)
- Ratramnus
- Ruprecht of Deutz
- William of Auxerre (d. after 1230)
- William of Thierry

==== Scholasticism at its zenith (1200–1300) ====
The most brilliant period of Scholasticism embraces about 100 years, and with it are connected the names of Alexander of Hales, Albertus Magnus, Bonaventure, Thomas Aquinas, and Duns Scotus. This period of Scholasticism was marked by the appearance of the theological Summae, as well as the mendicant orders. In the thirteenth century the champions of Scholasticism were to be found in the Franciscans and Dominicans, beside whom worked also the Augustinians, Carmelites, and Servites.

Alexander of Hales (d. about 1245) was a Franciscan, while Albert the Great (d. 1280) was a Dominican. The Summa theologiæ of Alexander of Hales is the largest and most comprehensive work of its kind, flavoured with Platonism. Albert was an intellectual working not only in matters philosophical and theological but in the natural sciences as well. He made a first attempt to present the entire philosophy of Aristotle and to place it at the service of Catholic theology. The logic of Aristotle had been rendered into Latin by Boethius and had been used in the schools since the end of the sixth century; but his physics and metaphysics were made known to Western Christendom only through the Arabic philosophers of the thirteenth century. His works were prohibited by the Synod of Paris, in 1210, and again by a Bull of Pope Gregory IX in 1231. Later Scholastics, led by Albert the Great, went over the faulty Latin translation once more, and reconstructed the doctrine of Aristotle and its principles.

Bonaventure (d. 1274) and Thomas Aquinas (d. 1274), mark the highest development of Scholastic theology. St. Bonaventure follows Alexander of Hales, his fellow-religious and predecessor, but surpasses him in mysticism and clearness of diction. Unlike the other Scholastics of this period, he did not write a theological Summa, but a Commentary on the Sentences, as well as his Breviloquium, a condensed Summa. Alexander of Hales and Bonaventure represent the old Franciscan Schools, from which the later School of Duns Scotus essentially differed.

Thomas Aquinas holds the same rank among the theologians as does Augustine among the Fathers of the Church. He is distinguished by wealth of ideas, systematic exposition of them, and versatility. For dogmatic theology his most important work is the Summa theologica.

Duns Scotus (1266–1308), by bold and virulent criticism of the Thomistic system, was to a great extent responsible for its decline. Scotus is the founder a new Scotistic School, in the speculative treatment of dogma. Later Franciscans, among them Costanzo de Sarnano, set about minimizing or even reconciling the doctrinal differences of the two.

===== Other notable theologians of the period =====
- Peter of Tarentaise. (d. 1276)
- Ulric of Strasburg (d. 1277)
- William de la Mare (d. 1285)
- Henry of Ghent (d. 1293)
- Richard of Middleton (d. 1300)
- Ægidius of Rome (d. 1316)

==== Gradual decline of Scholasticism (1300–1500) ====
The following period showed both consolidation, and disruption: the Fraticelli, nominalism, conflict between Church and State (Philip the Fair, Louis of Bavaria, the Avignon Papacy). The spread of Nominalism owed much to two pupils of Duns Scotus: the Frenchman Peter Aureolus (d. 1321) and the Englishman William Occam (d. 1347).

Nominalism had less effect on the Dominican theologians, who were as a rule loyal Thomists. It was in the early part of the sixteenth century that commentaries on the "Summa Theologica" of Aquinas began to appear. The Franciscans partly favoured Nominalism, partly adhered to pure Scotism. The Augustinian James of Viterbo (d. 1308) attached himself to Ægidius of Rome; Gregory of Rimini (d. 1359), championed an undisguised nominalism. Among the Carmelites, Gerard of Bologna (d. 1317) was a staunch Thomist. Generally speaking, the later Carmelites were followers of Aquinas. The Order of the Carthusians produced in the fifteenth century a prominent theologian in the person of Dionysius Ryckel (d. 1471), surnamed "the Carthusian", who set up his chair in Roermond, (the Netherlands).

Outside the religious orders were many other. The Englishman Thomas Bradwardine (d. 1340), was the foremost mathematician of his day and a celebrated scholastic philosopher and doctor of theology. He is often called Doctor Profundus. (The Carmelite Thomas Netter (d. 1430), surnamed Waldensis, was an English Scholastic theologian and controversialist. Nicholas of Cusa (d. 1404) was an early proponent of Renaissance humanism, and inaugurated a new and speculative system in dogmatic theology. A thorough treatise on the Church was written by John Torquemada (d. 1468), and a similar work by St. John Capistran (d. 1456). Alphonsus Tostatus (d. 1454) interspersed his Biblical commentaries on the Scriptures with dogmatic treatises. His work "Quinque paradoxa" is a treatise on Christology and Mariology.

===== Other notable theologians of the period =====
- John of Paris (d. 1306)
- Hervæus de Nedellec (d. 1323)
- Francis Mayronis (d. 1327)
- Durand of St. Pourçain (d. 1332)
- Nicholas of Lyra (d. 1341)
- Peter of Palude (d. 1342)
- John Baconthorp (d. 1346)
- Robert Holcot (d. 1349)
- Thomas of Strasburg (d. 1357)
- Peter of Aquila (d. about 1370)
- Jean Gerson (d. 1429)
- John Capreolus (d. 1444)
- Antonine of Florence (d. 1459)
- Nicolaus de Orbellis (ca. 1460)
- Gabriel Biel (d. 1495)
- Francis of Ferrara (d. 1528)
- Thomas Cajetan (d. 1537)
- Berthold of Chiemsee (d. 1543)

== Modern era (1500–1900) ==
The Protestant Reformation brought about a more accurate definition of important Catholic articles of faith. From the period of the Renaissance the revival of classical studies gave new vigour to exegesis and patrology, while the Reformation stimulated the universities which had remained Catholic, especially in Spain (Salamanca, Alcalá), Portugal (Coimbra) and in the Netherlands (Louvain), to intellectual research. The Sorbonne of Paris regained its lost prestige only towards the end of the sixteenth century. Among the religious orders the newly founded Society of Jesus probably contributed most to the revival and growth of theology. Matthias Joseph Scheeben distinguishes five phases in this period.

=== First phase: to the Council of Trent (1500–1570) ===
The whole literature of this period bears an apologetical and controversial character and deals with those subjects which had been attacked most bitterly: the rule and sources of faith, the Church, grace, the sacraments, especially the holy Eucharist. Peter Canisius (d. 1597) gave to the Catholics not only his world-renowned catechism, but also a most valuable Mariology.

In England John Fisher, Bishop of Rochester (d. 1535), and Thomas More (d. 1535) championed the cause of the Catholic faith. The Jesuit Nicholas Sanders wrote one of the best treatises on the Church. In Belgium the professors of the University of Louvain opened new paths for the study of theology, foremost among them were: Jodocus Ravesteyn (d. 1570), and John Hessels (d. 1566).

In France Jacques Merlin, and Gilbert Génebrard (d. 1597) rendered great services to dogmatic theology. Sylvester Prierias (d. 1523), Ambrose Catharinus (d; 1553), and Cardinal Seripandus are the boast of Italy. But, above all other countries, Spain is distinguished: Alphonsus of Castro (d. 1558), Michael de Medina (d. 1578), Peter de Soto (d. 1563). Some of their works have remained classics, such as "De natura et gratia" (Venice 1547) of Dominic Soto; "De justificatione libri XV" (Venice, 1546) of Andrew Vega; "De locis theologicis" (Salamanca, 1563) of Melchior Cano.

==== Other notable theologians of the period ====
- Johann Eck (d. 1543)
- Cochlæus (d. 1552)
- Friedrich Staphylus (d. 1564)
- James of Hoogstraet (d. 1527)
- John Gropper (d. 1559)
- Albert Pighius (d. 1542)
- Stephen Gardiner (d. 1555)
- Reginald Pole (d. 1568)
- Cardinal Hosius (d. 1579)
- Johannes Molanus (d. 1585)
- Martin Cromer (d. 1589)
- William Allen (d. 1594)

=== Second phase: late Scholasticism at its height (1570–1660) ===
It was not until the seventeenth century, and then only for practical reasons, that moral theology was separated from the main body of Catholic dogma. The necessity of a further division of labour led to the independent development of other disciplines: apologetics, exegesis, church history. While apologetics uses historical and philosophical arguments, dogmatic theology makes use of Scripture and Tradition to prove the Divine character of the different dogmas.

Robert Bellarmine (d. 1621), was a controversialist theologian who defended almost the whole of Catholic theology against the attacks of the Reformers. Jacques Davy Duperron (d. 1618) of France wrote a treatise on the Holy Eucharist. The pulpit orator Bossuet (d. 1627) preached from the standpoint of history. The Præscriptiones Catholicae was a voluminous work of the Italian Gravina (7 vols., Naples, 1619–39). Adrian (d. 1669) and Peter de Walemburg (d. 1675), easily ranked among the best controversialists.

The development of positive theology went hand in hand with the progress of research into the Patristic Era and into the history of dogma. These studies were especially cultivated in France and Belgium. A number of scholars, thoroughly versed in history, published in monographs the results of their investigations into the history of particular dogmas. Joannes Morinus (d. 1659) made the Sacrament of Penance the subject of special study; Hallier (d. 1659), the Sacrament of Holy Orders, Jean Garnier (d. 1681), Pelagianism; Étienne Agard de Champs (d. 1701), Jansenism; Tricassinus (d. 1681), Augustine's doctrine on grace. The Jesuit Petavius (d. 1647) and the Oratorian Louis Thomassin (d. 1695), wrote "Dogmata theologica". They placed positive theology on a new basis without disregarding the speculative element.

==== Neo-scholasticism ====
Religious orders fostered scholastic theology. Thomas Aquinas and Bonaventure were proclaimed Doctors of the Church, respectively by Pope Pius V and Pope Sixtus V.

At the head of the Thomists was Domingo Bañez (d. 1604), who wrote a commentary on the theological Summa of Aquinas, which, combined with a similar work by Bartholomew Medina (d. 1581), forms a harmonious whole. The Carmelites of Salamanca produced the Cursus Salmanticensis (Salamanca, 1631–1712) in 15 folios, as commentary on the Summa. At Louvain William Estius (d. 1613) wrote a Thomist commentary on the "Liber Sententiarum" of Peter the Lombard, while his colleague Francis Sylvius (d. 1649) explained the theological Summa of the master himself. In the Sorbonne Thomism was represented by Nicholas Ysambert (d. 1624). The University of Salzburg also furnished the Theologia scholastica of Augustine Reding, who held the chair of theology in that university from 1645 to 1658.

The Franciscans maintained doctrinal opposition to the Thomists, with steadily continued Scotist commentaries on Peter the Lombard. Scotistic manuals for use in schools were published about 1580 William Herincx. The Capuchins, on the other hand, adhered to Bonaventure, as, e.g., Gaudentius of Brescia, (d. 1672).

==== Jesuit theologians ====
The Society of Jesus substantially adhered to the Summa of Thomas Aquinas, yet at the same time it made use of an eclectic freedom. Luis Molina (d. 1600) was the first Jesuit to write a commentary on the Summa of St. Thomas. Leading Jesuits were the Spaniards Francisco Suárez (d. 1617), and Gabriel Vasquez (d. 1604). Suárez was named "Doctor Eximius" by Pope Benedict XIV. Caspar Hurtado (d. 1646) wrote a commentary on Aquinas. A theological manual was written by Sylvester Maurus (d. 1687). Francesco Sforza Pallavicino, (d. 1667), known as the historiographer of the Council of Trent, won repute as a dogmatic theologian by several of his writings.

==== Other notable theologians of the period ====
- Francisco de Toledo (d. 1596)
- Gregory of Valencia (d. 1603)
- Mauritius Hibernicus (d. 1603)
- Francis Zumel (d. 1607)
- Thomas Stapleton (d. 1608)
- Leonard Lessius (d. 1623)
- Martin Becanus (d. 1624)
- James Gretser (d. 1625)
- Aodh Mac Cathmhaoil (d. 1626)
- Tomas de Lemos (d. 1629)
- Philip Fabri (d. 1630)
- Adam Tanner (d. 1632)
- Ægidius Coninck (d. 1633)
- Antony Hickey (d. 1641)
- John a St. Thoma (d. 1644)
- John Paul Nazarius (d. 1646)
- John de Lugo (d. 1660)
- Xantes Mariales (d. 1660)
- John Punch (d. 1660)
- Leo Allatius (d. 1669)
- Vincent Contenson (d. 1674)
- Jean Baptiste Gonet (d. 1681)
- Francesco Lorenzo Brancati di Lauria (d. 1693)
- Antoine Massoulié (d. 1706)

=== Third phase: decline of Scholasticism (1660–1760) ===
Other counter-currents of thought set in: Cartesianism in philosophy, Gallicanism, and Jansenism. Bernard de Rubeis (d. 1775) produced a monograph on original sin. José Saenz d'Aguirre (d. 1699) wrote the three volume work "Theology of St. Anselm". Among the Franciscans Claudius Frassen (d. 1680) issued his elegant Scotus academicus. Eusebius Amort (d. 1775), the foremost theologian in Germany, combined conservatism with due regard for modern demands.

The "Theologia Wirceburgensis" was published in 1766–71 by the Jesuits of Würzburg. The new school of Augustinians based their theology on the system of Gregory of Rimini rather than on that of Ægidius of Rome. To this school belonged Henry Noris (d. 1704). Its best work on dogmatic theology came from the pen of Giovanni Lorenzo Berti (d. 1766).

The French Oratory took up Jansenism, with Pasquier Quesnel and Lebrun. The Sorbonne of Paris also adopted aspects of Jansenism and Gallicanism. Exceptions were Louis Abelly (d. 1691) and Honoratus Tournély (d. 1729), whose "Prælectiones dogmaticæ" are numbered among the best theological text-books.

Against Jansenism stood the Jesuits Dominic Viva (d. 1726), and La Fontaine (d. 1728). Gallicanism and Josephinism were also pressed by the Jesuit theologians, especially by Francesco Antonio Zaccaria (d. 1795), Alfonso Muzzarelli (d. 1813), Bolgeni (d. 1811), Roncaglia, and others. The Jesuits were seconded by the Dominicans Giuseppe Agostino Orsi (d. 1761) and Thomas Maria Mamachi (d. 1792). Barnabite Hyacinthe Sigismond Gerdil (d. 1802) was a significant figure in the response of the papacy to the upheavals caused by the French Revolution. Alphonsus Liguori (d. 1787) wrote popular works.

==== Other notable theologians of the period ====
- Marin Mersenne (d. 1648)
- Celestine Sfondrato (d. 1696)
- Vincent Louis Gotti (d. 1742)

=== Fourth phase: at a low ebb (1760–1840) ===
In France the influences of Jansenism and Gallicanism were still powerful, while in the German Empire Josephinism and Febronianism spread. The suppression of the Society of Jesus by Pope Clement XIV occurred in 1773. The period was dominated by the European Enlightenment, the French Revolution, and German idealism.

Marian Dobmayer (d. 1805) wrote a standard manual. Benedict Stattler (d. 1797) was a member of the German Catholic Enlightenment and wrote against Immanuel Kant's Critique of Pure Reason, as did Patrick Benedict Zimmer (d. 1820).

=== Fifth phase: restoration of dogmatic theology (1840–1900) ===
Harold Acton remarked on the large number of histories of dogma published in Germany published in the years 1838 to 1841. Joseph Görres (d. 1848) and Ignaz von Döllinger (d. 1890) intended that Catholic theology should influence the development of German states.

Johann Adam Möhler advanced patrology and symbolism. Both positive and speculative theology received a new lease of life, the former through Heinrich Klee (d. 1840), the latter through Franz Anton Staudenmaier (d. 1856). At the same time men like Joseph Kleutgen (d. 1883), Karl Werner (d. 1888), and Albert Stöckl (d. 1895) supported Scholasticism by thorough historical and systematic writings.

In France and Belgium the dogmatic theology of Thomas-Marie-Joseph Gousset (d. 1866) of Reims and the writings of Jean-Baptiste Malou, Bishop of Bruges (d. 1865) exerted great influence. In North America there were the works of Francis Kenrick (d. 1863); Cardinal Camillo Mazzella (d. 1900) wrote his dogmatic works while occupying the chair of theology at Woodstock College, Maryland. In England Nicholas Wiseman (d. 1865), and Cardinal Manning (d. 1892) advanced Catholic theology.

In Italy, Gaetano Sanseverino (d. 1865), Matteo Liberatore (d. 1892), and Salvator Tongiorgi (d. 1865) worked to restore Scholastic philosophy, against traditionalism and ontologism, which had a numerous following among Catholic scholars in Italy, France, and Belgium. The pioneer work in positive theology fell to the Jesuit Giovanni Perrone (d. 1876) in Rome. Other theologians, as Carlo Passaglia (d. 1887), Clement Schrader (d. 1875), Cardinal Franzelin (d. 1886), Domenico Palmieri (d. 1909), and others, continued his work.

Among the Dominicans was Cardinal Zigliara, an inspiring teacher and fertile author. Germany produced a number of prominent theologians, as Johannes von Kuhn (d. 1887), Anton Berlage (d. 1881), Franz Xaver Dieringer (d. 1876), Albert Knoll (d. 1863), Heinrich Joseph Dominicus Denzinger (d. 1883), Constantine von Schäzler (d. 1880), Bernard Jungmann (d. 1895), and others. Germany's leading orthodox theologian at this time was Joseph Scheeben (d. 1888).

==== First Vatican Council ====
The First Vatican Council was held (1870) and sought a middle ground between the competing approaches of traditionalism and rational liberalism. The Council issued the dogmatic constitution Dei Filius, which stated in part that there is no real discrepancy between faith and reason, since the same God who reveals mysteries and infuses faith has bestowed the light of reason on the human mind; and that any apparent contradiction is mainly due, either to the dogmas of faith not having been understood and interpreted fully, or unproven scientific or critical theory assumed to be certain.

Pope Leo XIII in his Encyclical Æterni Patris (1879) restored the study of the Scholastics, especially of St. Thomas, in all higher Catholic schools, a measure which was again emphasized by Pope Pius X.

== Since 1900 ==
Ludwig Ott's 1952 Fundamentals of Catholic Dogma is considered a standard reference work on dogmatics. An updated and revised edition was issued by Baronius Press in 2018.

The Second Vatican Council referred to both "dogmatic theology", rooted in biblical themes, and what it called "the other theological disciplines", such as moral theology and liturgy, as important dimensions of ecclesiastical study.

== Development of Dogma ==
Around 434, Vincent of Lérins wrote Commonitorium, in which he recognized that doctrine can develop over time. New doctrines could not be declared, but older ones better understood. In John Henry Newman's 1845 "Essay on the Development of Christian Doctrine", Newman listed seven criteria which "...can be applied in proper proportions to that further interpretation of dogmas aimed at giving them contemporary relevance." After its publication, Newman developed a lengthy correspondence with Giovanni Perrone, chair of dogmatic theology at the Roman College, particularly on the development of doctrine. An advisor to Popes Gregory XVI and Pius IX, Perrone was consultor of various congregations and was active in the discussions which resulted in the 1854 dogmatic definition of the Immaculate Conception.

== See also ==
- Dogma in the Catholic Church
