= Miguel Medina =

Miguel Medina may refer to:

- Miguel Medina (footballer), Paraguayan footballer
- Miguel de Medina, Spanish Franciscan theologian.
- Miguel Hidalgo Medina, Peruvian minister of the interior
- Miguel Angel Medina, Mexican weightlifter

== See also ==
- Miguel Romo Medina, Mexican politician
