= Guillaume-René Meignan =

French Catholic apologist, scriptural exegete, archbishop and cardinal

His Eminence Guillaume-René Meignan
- Cardinal, Archbishop of Tours
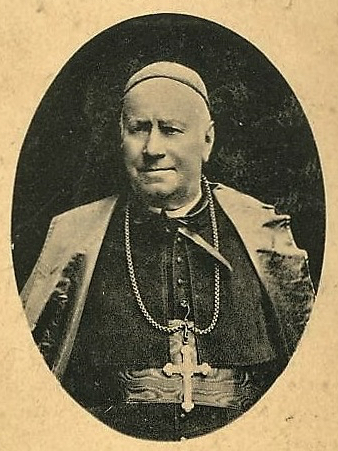
- Church: Catholic Church
- Archdiocese: Tours
- Appointed: 24 March 1894
- Installed: 27 May 1894
- Term ended: 20 January 1896
- Predecessor: Charles-Théodore Colet
- Successor: René-François Renou
- Other post: Cardinal-Priest of Santissima Trinità al Monte Pincio (1893-96)
- Previous posts: Bishop of Châlons-en-Champagne (1865-82); Bishop of Arras (1882-84)

Orders
- Ordination: 13 June 1840
- Consecration: 1 May 1865 by Henri Louis Charles Maret
- Created cardinal: 16 January 1893 by Leo XIII
- Rank: Cardinal-Priest

Personal details
- Born: Guillaume-René Meignan; 12 April 1817 Denazé, Le Mans, French Kingdom
- Died: 20 January 1896 (aged 78) Tours, French Third Republic
- Parents: Jean Baptiste Meignan; Françoise Julie Rabeau
- Education: La Sapienza
- Motto: Pax in caritate
- Coat of arms

Guillaume-René Meignan (12 April 1817 at Chauvigné, France – 20 January 1896 at Tours) was a French Catholic apologist and scriptural exegete, Archbishop of Tours and cardinal.

== Life ==
Having ascertained his vocation to the priesthood, on the completion of his academic studies at the Angers lycée and at Château-Gontier, he studied philosophy in the seminary of Le Mans, where he received the subdiaconate in 1839. From this institution he passed to the Collège de Tessé, which belonged to the Diocese of Le Mans, where, while teaching in one of the middle grades, he continued his own ecclesiastical studies.

The Abbé Bercy, an Orientalist of some distinction, whose notice he attracted at Le Mans and later at Tessé, advised him to make scriptural exegesis his special study. Jean-Baptiste Bouvier ordained him priest (14 June 1840) and sent him to Paris for a further course in philosophy under Victor Cousin. Meignan made the acquaintance of Ozanam, Montalembert, and others like them, who urged him to prepare for the controversial needs of the day by continuing his studies in Germany.

Following this advice, he became the pupil at Munich of such teachers as Joseph Görres, Ignaz von Döllinger, and Karl Joseph Hieronymus Windischmann; and when his earlier attraction for Scriptural studies was thoroughly reawakened under the stimulus of the then fresh Tübingen discussions, he repaired to Berlin where he attended the lectures of August Neander, Ernst Wilhelm Hengstenberg, and Friedrich Wilhelm Joseph Schelling.

In, or soon after May, 1843, Meignan returned to Paris to be numbered among the clergy of the archdiocese, but was soon (1845) obliged to visit Rome for the good of his health, which had become impaired. He seemed to recover immediately, and was able to follow his studies so successfully that he won a Doctorate of Theology at the Sapienza (March, 1846). Here again he was helped by the interest and advice of many eminent men, of Giovanni Perrone and Olympe-Philippe Gerbet, as well as by the teaching of Carlo Passaglia, Francis Xavier Patrizi, and Augustin Theiner. Between this period and 1861, when he became professor of Sacred Scripture at the Sorbonne, he filled various academical positions in the Archdiocese of Paris, of which Georges Darboy made him vicar-general in 1863. In 1864 he was elevated to the Bishopric of Châlons, in 1882 transferred to the See of Arras, and in 1884 to the Archbishopric of Tours.

Pope Leo XIII raised him to the cardinalate on 16 December 1892.

== Works ==
He was one of the chief antagonists of Ernest Renan. He aimed to enlighten the lay mind on current topics of controversy and to supply his readers with the Christian point of view. His apologetic works include:

- Les prophéties messianiques. Le Pentateuque (Paris, 1856)
- M. Renan réfuté par les rationalistes allemands (Paris, 1860)
- Les Evangiles et la critique au XIXe siècle (Paris, 1860)
- De l'irréligion systématique, ses influences actuelles (Paris, 1886)
- Salomon, son règne, ses écrits (Paris, 1890)
- Les prophètes d'Israël et le Messie, depuis Daniel jusqu'à Jean-Baptiste (Paris, 1892)

He wrote many other works on similar topics. His treatment of Messianic prophecy extends beyond verbal exegesis, and includes a critical examination of historical events and conditions. Like other great Catholic controversialists of his time, he was criticized by some writers.
