= Salvator Tongiorgi =

Italian jesuit (1820–1865)

Salvator Tongiorgi (25 December 1820 – 12 November 1865) was an Italian Jesuit philosopher and theologian.

== Life ==
Born in Rome, Tongiorgi entered the Society of Jesus at the age of seventeen. After the usual noviceship, literary and philosophical studies, a half-decade was spent in teaching rhetoric at Reggio Emilia and humanities at Forlì. Then four years were passed in the study of theology, under professors such as Giovanni Perrone and Carlo Passaglia.

Immediately after this, in 1853, the young priest was assigned to the chair of philosophy in the Roman College, and there during twelve years distinguished himself as a teacher and author. Within a few days of his forty-fourth birthday he was appointed assistant to the provincial of the Roman Province; but his health gave way before a year had elapsed.

== Works ==
Tongiorgi wrote a well-known course of philosophy, Institutiones philosophicae, which he published in three volumes at Rome in 1861 and at Brussels in 1862. Nine editions appeared during the next eighteen years, some of them modified by Claudio Ranieri. A compendium of the same work and a separate volume on ethics also came from his pen. All his works were used as textbooks for college or seminary.

On some of the mooted questions in philosophy the author departed from the scholastic tradition, rejecting the Peripatetic theory of matter and form, denying the real distinction between accidents and substance, and claiming that mere resultants of mechanical and chemical forces could produce the life-activity seen in the vegetable world. These doctrines were not widely accepted; yet they stimulated neo-Scholasticism to make better use of the researches carried on in the physical sciences.
