= Matthias Joseph Scheeben =

German Catholic priest and theologian (1835–1888)

The Reverend Matthias Joseph Scheeben
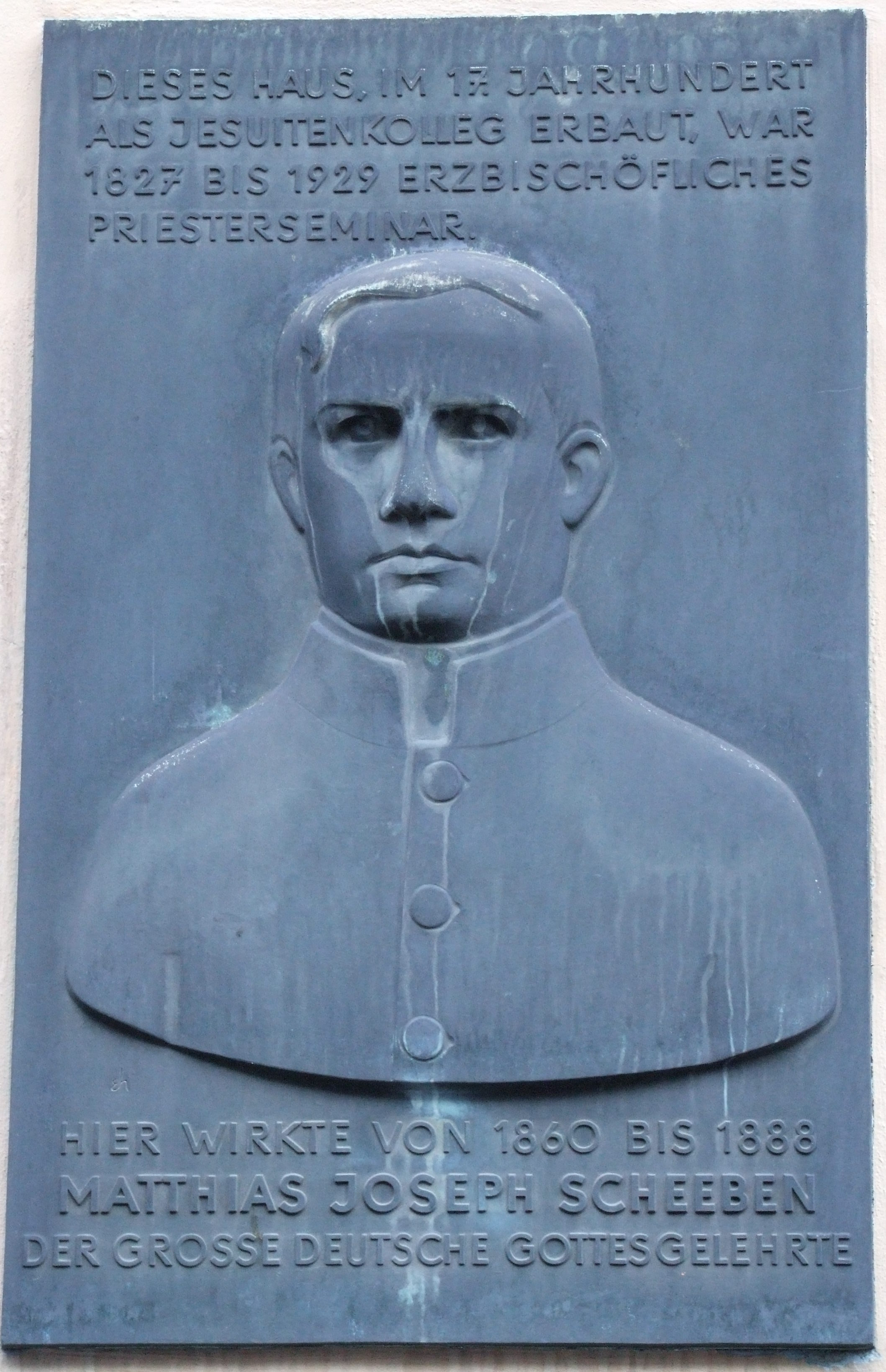
- Born: Matthias Joseph Scheeben; 1 March 1835; Meckenheim, Prussia
- Died: 21 July 1888 (aged 53); Cologne, Prussia
- Education: Gregorian University
- Church: Catholic Church
- Ordained: December 18, 1858 (priest)

Matthias Joseph Scheeben (Meckenheim, Rhine Province, 1 March 1835 – Cologne, 21 July 1888) was a German Catholic priest and theologian. He is regarded as "one of the greatest minds of modern Catholic theology."

== Life ==
Scheeben studied at the Gregorian University at Rome under Carlo Passaglia, Luigi Taparelli and Giovanni Perrone from 1852 to 1859 and lived in Collegium Germanicum. He was ordained to the priesthood on 18 December 1858. He taught dogmatic theology at the diocesan seminary of Cologne from 1860 to 1875. Scheeben was an impassioned advocate of religious freedom during the Kulturkampf.

== Theology ==
In Scheeben's own words, the practical aim of his theology was "to make the Christian feel happy about his faith. Because the beauty and eminence of our faith consist in this: that through the mysteries of grace it raises our nature to an immeasurably high plane and presents to us an inexpressibly intimate union with God."

== Mysticism ==
Scheeben's mind reveled in speculating on Divine grace, the hypostatic union, the beatific vision, the all-pervading presence of God; he was a firm believer in visions granted to himself and others, and his piety was all-absorbing. Very few minds were attuned to his. His pupils were allegedly overawed by the steady flow of his long abstruse sentences which brought scanty light to their intellects; his colleagues and his friends but rarely disturbed the peace of the workroom where his spirit brooded over a chaos of literary matters.

== Works ==
The list of Scheeben's works opens with three treatises dealing with grace:

1. Natur und Gnade: Versuch einer systematischen, wissenschaftlichen Darstellung der natürlichen und übernatürlichen Lebensordnung im Menschen (Mainz: Franz Kirchheim, 1861). This work by Scheeben was translated from German into English by Cyril Oscar Vollert, SJ. Vollert's English translation was published under the title Nature and Grace (St. Louis & London: B. Herder Book Co., 1954).
2. Quid est homo: sive controversia de statu purae naturae, qua ratio simul et finis oeconomiae Dei erga homines supernaturalis: uberrime demonstratur ex Patrum praesertim sententia (Mainz: Franz Kirchheim; Rome: Joseph Spithöver, 1862). This was not an original work by Scheeben, but rather a new edition of a work which Antonio Casini, SJ (1687-1755) had published in 1724. Scheeben's 1862 edition of Casini's work contained the text of the original work, plus an Introduction and notes provided by Scheeben. According to Cyril O. Vollert (see Vollert's "Foreword" to Scheeben's Nature and Grace), Scheeben's purpose in publishing this edition of Casini's work was "to supply a patristic foundation for Nature and Grace." Casini's original work was titled R. P. Antonii Casini e Societate Jesu, Controversia de statu purae naturae in compendium redacta: et ad linguarum Ebraicae et Graecae publicam exercitationem adhibita a Philippo Dazon in Collegio Romano auspiciis eminentiss. ac reverendiss. principis Melchioris de Polignac S.R.E. cardinalis amplissimi (Romae: Typis de Martiis, 1724).
3. Die Herrlichkeiten der göttlichen gnade. Freiburg: 1863. 8th ed. by A.M. Weiss, 1908. "... the work is popular in scope and became enormously successful. An English translation, The Glories of Divine Grace, appeared during Scheeben’s lifetime ..." (Vollert x)
4. Mysterien des Christenthums. Freiburg: 1865–97. Trans. The Mysteries of Christianity. This is "... Scheeben's most famous book ... There is no other work quite like it in the vast history of Christian literature." (Vollert xi)
5. Five pamphlets in defence of the Vatican Council, directed against Ignaz von Döllinger, Johann Friedrich von Schulte, and other Old Catholics.
6. Handbuch der katholischen Dogmatik. 7 parts. Freiburg: 1873–87.

The author did not finish this last; he died whilst working on "Grace". The missing treatises were supplied in German by Dr. Leonhard Atzberger (Freiburg, 1898). In English the missing treatises were supplied by Wilhelm and Scannel, who whilst strictly adhering to Scheeben's thought, reduced the bulky work to two handy volumes entitled: A Manual of Catholic Theology based on Scheeben's Dogmatik (3rd ed., 1906). The process of publishing an English translation of the unabridged original text began in 2019, when Michael J. Miller's translation (titled, Handbook of Catholic Dogmatics, Book One: Theological Epistemology, Part One: The Objective Principles of Theological Knowledge) was published by Emmaus Academic. The publisher hopes to continue this monumental task in service of making this classic of Scheeben available, unabridged, to English readers.

Scheeben also wrote a two-volume work "Mariology," later translated into English.

He founded and edited (1867–88) the Kölner Pastoralblatt and edited for thirteen years Das ökumenische Concil vom Jahre 1869, later (after 1872) entitled Periodische Blätter zu wissenschaftlichen Besprechung der grossen religiösen Fragen der Gegenwart.
