= Meignan =

Meignan is a surname. Notable people with the surname include:

- Guillaume-René Meignan (1817–1896), French Catholic apologist
- Hunter Meighan (1914–2008), American lawyer and politician
- Laetitia Meignan (born 1960), French judoka
