= Baronius Press =

Baronius Press is a traditional Catholic book publisher. It was founded in London, in 2002 by Ashley Paver and other young Catholics who had previously worked in publishing and printing. The press takes its name from the cardinal Cesare Baronius, a Neapolitan ecclesiastical historian who lived from 1538 to 1607. Its logo is a biretta, which together with a cassock forms the traditional image of a Catholic priest.

== History and publications ==
The original objective of Baronius Press was to raise the quality of traditional Catholic books in order to make them more appealing to a wider audience. Baronius Press aimed to achieve this goal by retypesetting classic Catholic books (rather than republishing facsimiles) and binding them using high quality coverings such as leather. The advantages of retypesetting are clearer text and the ability to use modern layouts.

The first publication of the Baronius Press was a new edition of the Douay–Rheims Bible. This was significant because no digitally typeset edition had been previously released. A pocket edition and a Psalms and New Testament edition followed, and, in 2007, a giant size format was added to the range. In 2008, their range of Bibles was expanded by a parallel Douay–Rheims / Clementine Vulgate, which includes the appendix to the Old Testament which contains the Prayer of Manasseh, 3 Esdras, and 4 Esdras.

In 2004, Baronius Press published a new 1962 missal in cooperation with the Priestly Fraternity of St. Peter, bearing an imprimatur from Bishop Fabian Wendelin Bruskewitz, for use at the traditional Roman mass. This was the first missal intended for use at the traditional mass with an imprimatur to be published in more than 35 years. A new edition coinciding with Pope Benedict XVI's 2007 motu proprio Summorum Pontificum was named the Motu Proprio edition of the 1962 Missal. It was noted in several Catholic newspapers and journals that it is currently the only 1962 Missal being published with a valid imprimatur.

Later in 2004, Baronius released a series of leather bound Catholic classics with the aim of expanding its range. By the end of 2006, the company had over 40 titles in print with the release of a new paperback series called Christian Classics.

Baronius published a new edition of the Little Office of the Blessed Virgin Mary that contained all of the relevant Gregorian chants in October 2007. It was the first book to contain the complete music for the office. Websites complained that it contained several minor errors, and a revised edition correcting these was published at the end of 2008. In April 2012, its much anticipated Latin-English Roman Breviary was published, having been granted an imprimatur by Bishop Fabian Bruskewitz. Both the Breviary and the Little Office published by Baronius conform to the editio typica of the Breviary of 1961.

In October 2012, a complete edition of the Bible translated by Ronald Knox was published, with endorsements from Cardinal Cormac Murphy-O'Connor, Archbishop Vincent Nichols, and Anglican Archbishop Rowan Williams.

In 2017 Baronius published an updated edition of Ludwig Ott's Fundamentals of Catholic Dogma. This edition was edited by Robert Fastiggi, who also translated the latest edition of Denzinger's Enchiridion Symbolorum into English, incorporating a better translation of the German edition (including changes made by Ott himself after the Second Vatican Council), correcting some errors that had appeared in earlier English versions, and included references to Denzinger and the Catechism of the Catholic Church. It received an Imprimatur from Bishop Malcolm McMahon of Liverpool, United Kingdom and a foreword by Bishop Athanasius Schneider of Astana, Kazakhstan.

== Hardback book list ==
- Douay–Rheims Bible
- Msgr Knox's Translation of the Vulgate Bible
- 1962 Roman Rite Missal (motu proprio edition)
- 1961 Latin-English Roman Breviary
- 1961 Little Office of the Blessed Virgin
- Rule of Saint Benedict by St Benedict
- Dark Night of the Soul by St John of the Cross
- The Way of Perfection by St Teresa of Ávila
- The Story of a Soul by St Thérèse of Lisieux
- True Devotion to the Blessed Virgin Mary by St Louis de Montfort
- Dolorous Passion by Blessed Anne Catherine Emmerich
- Meditations and Devotions by St John Henry Newman
- Imitation of Christ by Thomas à Kempis
- The Holy Mass by Dom Prosper Guéranger
- Apologetics and Catholic Doctrine by Archbishop Michael Sheehan
- The Catechism of the Council of Trent
- Fundamentals of Catholic Dogma by Ludwig Ott
- The Baltimore Catechism (Numbers 1-4)
