= Josse van Clichtove =

Flemish theologian

Josse van Clichtove, Chlichtove, Clicthove or Judocus Clichtoveus Neoportuensis (Nieuwpoort, 1472/73 – Chartres 22 September 1543), was a Flemish theologian, priest and humanist.

== Life ==
He received his education at Leuven and at Paris under Jacques Lefèvre d'Étaples.

He became librarian of the Sorbonne and tutor to the nephews of Jacques d'Amboise, bishop of Clermont and abbot of Cluny. He is best known as a distinguished antagonist of Martin Luther, against whom he wrote extensively. He also published in German, thus trying to widen his auditorium, and leaving the theologians circles behind.

When Cardinal Duprat convened his Synod of Paris in 1528 to discuss the new religion, Clichtove was summoned and was entrusted with the task of collecting and summarizing the objections to the Lutheran doctrine. This he did in his Compendium veritatum ... contra erroneas Lutheranorum assertiones (Paris, 1529).

He died at Chartres on 22 September 1543. Devoted to Saint Cecilia, he left to the Cathedral of Chartres an endowment for the celebration of Mass on Cecilia's Day.

== Works ==
- De doctrina moriendi (Paris, 1520).
- Antilutherus (Paris, 1524).
- Compendium veritatum ad fidem pertinentium contra erroneas Lutheranorum assertiones ex dictis et actis in concilio provinciali Senonensi apud Parisios celebrato (Paris, 1529).
- Convulsio calumniarum Ulrichi Veleni quibus S. Petrum nunquam Romae fuisse cavillatur (Paris, 1535).
- Fundamentum Logicae. Introductio in terminorum cognitionem, in libros logicorum Aristotelis (Paris, 1538).
- De mystica numerorum significatione opusculum (Paris, 1513).
- De Sacramento Eucharistiae contra Œcolampadium (Paris, 1526).
- De vera nobilitate opusculum (Paris, 1512).
- De vita et moribus sacerdotum (Paris, 1519).
- Elucidatorium ecclesiasticum (Paris, 1516).
- De laudibus Sancti Ludovici regis Franciae. De laudibus sacratissimae virginis et martyris Ceciliae (Paris, 1516)
- Propugnaculum ecclesiae adversus Lutheranos (Paris, 1526).
- Sermones (Paris, 1534).
