= List of extreme temperatures in Vatican City =

The following list shows the readings of the maximum and minimum temperatures for each year from 1862 to the present, recorded in the weather station of the Collegio Romano in Rome, established in 1788. The station, actually located in the Italian territory, was opened when Rome was part of the Papal States. The first weather station in the Vatican state was opened only in 2009, and is placed in the Palace of the Governorate of Vatican City.

== Year by Year Temperature Extremes ==
Year	Extreme Maximum		Extreme Minimum		
Year	Temperature	Date	Temperature	Date	Extremeness
2012	98.4 °F / 36.9 °C	July 30	28 °F / −2.2 °C	February 14	70.4 / 39.1
2011	98.7 °F / 37.1 °C	July 13	30.9 °F / −0.6 °C	January 25	67.8 / 37.7
2010	97.5 °F / 36.4 °C	July 16	24.8 °F / −4 °C	December 17	72.7 / 40.4
2009	96 °F / 35.6 °C	July 24	28.4 °F / −2 °C	December 21	67.6 / 37.6
2008	94.1 °F / 34.5 °C	August 2	28.5 °F / −1.9 °C	February 18	65.6 / 36.4
2007	102 °F / 38.9 °C	August 25	29.8 °F / −1.2 °C	December 16	72.2 / 40.1
2006	97.8 °F / 36.6 °C	June 29	29.8 °F / −1.2 °C	January 25	68 / 37.8
2005	102.3 °F / 39.1 °C	July 29	27.3 °F / −2.6 °C	March 2	75 / 41.7
2004	96.4 °F / 35.8 °C	July 23	30 °F / −1.1 °C	January 25	66.4 / 36.9
2003	101.8 °F / 38.8 °C	August 6	30.3 °F / −0.9 °C	February 3	71.5 / 39.7
2002	96.2 °F / 35.7 °C	June 23	29.8 °F / −1.2 °C	January 7	66.4 / 36.9
2001	97.1 °F / 36.2 °C	August 4	31.1 °F / −0.5 °C	December 20	66 / 36.7
2000	101.8 °F / 38.8 °C	August 24	29.8 °F / −1.2 °C	January 27	72 / 40
1999	99.5 °F / 37.5 °C	August 11	29.3 °F / −1.5 °C	January 31	70.2 / 39
1998	100.2 °F / 37.9 °C	August 4	30.9 °F / −0.6 °C	December 9	69.3 / 38.5
1997	95 °F / 35 °C	August 11	37 °F / 2.8 °C	February 3	58 / 32.2
1996	95.5 °F / 35.3 °C	July 28	28.9 °F / −1.7 °C	December 28	66.6 / 37
1995	97.1 °F / 36.2 °C	July 21	30.9 °F / −0.6 °C	January 17	66.2 / 37
1994	98 °F / 36.7 °C	August 7	33.9 °F / 1.1 °C	February 15	64.1 / 35.6
1993	99.3 °F / 37.4 °C	August 4	29.1 °F / −1.6 °C	January 3	70.2 / 39
1992	100.2 °F / 37.9 °C	August 7	32.9 °F / 0.5 °C	January 2	67.3 / 37.4
1991	95.1 °F / 35.1 °C	August 11	30 °F / −1.1 °C	December 14	65.1 / 36.2
1990	96.4 °F / 35.8 °C	August 2	32.7 °F / 0.4 °C	January 13	63.7 / 35.4
1989	93.2 °F / 34 °C	August 18	30.3 °F / −0.9 °C	January 1	62.9 / 34.9
1988	96.8 °F / 35 °C	July 26	32 °F / 0.0 °C	December 17	64.8 / 35
1987	96.4 °F / 35.8 °C	July 24	26.6 °F / −2 °C	January 9	69.8 / 37.8
1986	93.2 °F / 34 °C	August 3	29.8 °F / −1.2 °C	December 26	63.4
1985	95.3 °F / 35.2 °C	July 21	22.1 °F / −5.5 °C	January 11	73.2 / 40.7
1984	93.9 °F / 34.4 °C	July 13	31.6 °F / −0.2 °C	February 19	62.3 / 34.6
1983	102.2 °F / 39 °C	July 28	30.2 °F / −1 °C	February 24	72 / 40
1982	98.9 °F / 37.2 °C	June 25	32 °F / 0.0 °C	February 3	66.9 / 37.2
1981	98.6 °F / 37 °C	August 4	26.6 °F / −2 °C	January 10	72 / 39
1980	92.4 °F / 33.6 °C	August 3	28.4 °F / −2 °C	January 4	64 / 35.6
1979	92.8 °F / 33.8 °C	July 31	23.7 °F / −4.6 °C	January 3	69.1 / 38.4
1978	92.4 °F / 33.6 °C	July 14	31.2 °F / −0.4 °C	January 9	61.2 / 34
1977	90.6 °F / 32.6 °C	July 30	30.9 °F / −0.6 °C	December 20	59.7 / 33.2
1976	90.6 °F / 32.6 °C	July 17	30.5 °F / −0.8 °C	January 29	60.1 / 33.4
1975	98.2 °F / 36.8 °C	July 18	31.6 °F / −0.2 °C	January 10	66.6 / 37
1974	95.1 °F / 35.1 °C	August 4	32 °F / 0.0 °C	December 24	63.1 / 35.1
1973	92.1 °F / 33.4 °C	July 4	27.1 °F / −2.7 °C	November 29	65 / 36.1
1972	95.3 °F / 35.2 °C	August 14	31.6 °F / −0.2 °C	December 19	63.7 / 35.4
1971	95.1 °F / 35.1 °C	August 8	28 °F / −2.2 °C	March 3	67.1 / 37.3
1970	94.6 °F / 34.8 °C	July 23	30.2 °F / −1 °C	February 17	64.4 / 35.8
1969	92.4 °F / 33.6 °C	August 14	28.7 °F / −1.8 °C	February 12	63.7 / 35.4
1968	96.4 °F / 35.8 °C	July 10	23.7 °F / −4.6 °C	January 14	72.7 / 40.4
1967	97.1 °F / 36.2 °C	July 24	25.8 °F / −3.4 °C	February 11	71.3 / 39.6
1966	94.2 °F / 34.6 °C	August 12	28.9 °F / −1.7 °C	January 9	65.3 / 36.3
1965	97.5 °F / 36.4 °C	June 26	28.4 °F / −2 °C	February 18	69.1 / 38.4
1964	95.3 °F / 35.2 °C	July 18	28 °F / −2.2 °C	February 9	67.3 / 37.4
1963	92.8 °F / 33.8 °C	June 28	25.3 °F / −3.7 °C	January 30	67.5 / 37.5
1962	95.3 °F / 35.2 °C	July 28	28.7 °F / −1.8 °C	January 30	66.6 / 37
1961	95.3 °F / 35.2 °C	June 20	27.6 °F / −2.4 °C	December 17	67.7 / 37.6
1960	93.2 °F / 34 °C	August 28	30.9 °F / −0.6 °C	January 14	62.3 / 34.6
1959	92.8 °F / 33.8 °C	July 28	30.5 °F / −0.8 °C	January 11	62.3 / 34.6
1958	96.8 °F / 35 °C	August 2	30.5 °F / −0.8 °C	January 30	66.3 / 35.8
1957	97.8 °F / 36.6 °C	August 12	30.9 °F / −0.6 °C	January 15	66.9 / 37.2
1956	103.8 °F / 39.9 °C	August 8	21.2 °F / −6 °C	February 16	82.6 / 45.9
1955	95.5 °F / 35.3 °C	July 20	30.2 °F / −1 °C	November 28	65.3 / 36.3
1954	94.6 °F / 34.8 °C	June 30	26.6 °F / −2 °C	January 26	68 / 36.8
1953	97.5 °F / 36.4 °C	July 18	28.9 °F / −1.7 °C	February 5	68.6 / 38.1
1952	97.7 °F / 36.5 °C	July 6	30.5 °F / −0.8 °C	January 21	67.2 / 37.3
1951	93.2 °F / 34 °C	August 4	32 °F / 0.0 °C	December 13	61.2 / 34
1950	97.1 °F / 36.2 °C	July 5	29.8 °F / −1.2 °C	January 3	67.3 / 37.4
1949	91.7 °F / 33.2 °C	August 6	25.5 °F / −3.6 °C	March 5	
1948	91.4 °F / 33 °C	August 8	27.6 °F / −2.4 °C	December 27	
1947	97.1 °F / 36.2 °C	August 4	26.6 °F / −2 °C	January 6	
1946	96.8 °F / 35 °C	August 6	28.7 °F / −1.8 °C	February 14	
1945	97.8 °F / 36.6 °C	July 30	26.6 °F / −2 °C	January 23	
1944	94.6 °F / 34.8 °C	August 23	27.3 °F / −2.6 °C	February 14	
1943	95.7 °F / 35.4 °C	August 18	29.8 °F / −1.2 °C	January 11	
1942	95 °F / 35 °C	July 10	22.6 °F / −5.2 °C	January 24	
1941	95 °F / 35 °C	July 26	22.6 °F / −5.2 °C	December 30	
1940	93.5 °F / 34.2 °C	August 10	26.9 °F / −2.8 °C	February 15	
1939	99.1 °F / 37.3 °C	July 19	23 °F / −5 °C	December 31	
1938	96.9 °F / 36.1 °C	July 30	24.4 °F / −4.2 °C	January 7	
1937	94.4 °F / 34.7 °C	July 31	31.6 °F / −0.2 °C	January 12	
1936	95.3 °F / 35.2 °C	July 18	29.1 °F / −1.6 °C	December 29	
1935	96.2 °F / 35.7 °C	June 26	25.8 °F / −3.4 °C	January 21	
1934	94.1 °F / 34.5 °C	July 21	31.1 °F / −0.5 °C	January 12	
1933	96.8 °F / 35 °C	July 15	32.1 °F / 0.1 °C	January 24	
1932	98.6 °F / 37 °C	August 18	27.3 °F / −2.6 °C	February 22	
1931	96.2 °F / 35.7 °C	August 5	27.1 °F / −2.7 °C	December 27	
1930	95.9 °F / 35.5 °C	July 8	33.2 °F / 0.7 °C	January 5	
1929	97.8 °F / 36.6 °C	July 22	22.2 °F / −5.4 °C	February 3	
1928	99.3 °F / 37.4 °C	August 3	29.3 °F / −1.5 °C	January 2	
1927	96.6 °F / 35.9 °C	August 9	23 °F / −5 °C	December 19	
1926	91 °F / 32.8 °C	July 20	28.7 °F / −1.8 °C	January 13	
1925	95.1 °F / 35.1 °C	July 22	26.2 °F / −3.2 °C	December 19	
1924	96 °F / 35.6 °C	July 5	28.4 °F / −2 °C	January 3	
1923	97.3 °F / 36.3 °C	August 12	27.6 °F / −2.4 °C	December 23	
1922	99.1 °F / 37.3 °C	August 9	28.4 °F / −2 °C	January 14	
1921	95 °F / 35 °C	July 27	30.7 °F / −0.7 °C	December 18	
1920	96.4 °F / 35.8 °C	July 20	30.2 °F / −1 °C	February 10	
1919	91.2 °F / 32.9 °C	August 14	24.9 °F / −3.9 °C	February 10	
1918	93.9 °F / 34.4 °C	July 18	28.2 °F / −2.1 °C	January 11	
1917	93.3 °F / 34.1 °C	August 1	27.8 °F / −2.3 °C	December 7	
1916	95.5 °F / 35.3 °C	July 10	32.3 °F / 0.2 °C	January 27	
1915	90.3 °F / 32.4 °C	July 13	28.7 °F / −1.8 °C	February 1	
1914	89.6 °F / 32 °C	June 30	27.8 °F / −2.3 °C	January 3	
1913	91.7 °F / 33.2 °C	August 20	28.4 °F / −2 °C	February 17	
1912	90.6 °F / 32.6 °C	July 15	30.7 °F / −0.7 °C	December 10	
1911	95.3 °F / 35.2 °C	July 31	24.8 °F / −4 °C	February 2	
1910	90.1 °F / 32.3 °C	July 23	30.3 °F / −0.9 °C	December 24	
1909	93.9 °F / 34.4 °C	July 30	28.4 °F / −2 °C	February 3	
1908	90.1 °F / 32.3 °C	August 1	28.5 °F / −1.9 °C	January 14	
1907	95.1 °F / 35.1 °C	August 8	26.9 °F / −2.8 °C	January 1	
1906	93.9 °F / 34.4 °C	August 4	29.6 °F / −1.3 °C	February 3	
1905	104.1 °F / 40.1 °C	July 3	23 °F / −5 °C	January 4	
1904	95.3 °F / 35.2 °C	July 18	28.4 °F / −2 °C	December 1	
1903	95.1 °F / 35.1 °C	July 19	28 °F / −2.2 °C	January 20	
1902	93.3 °F / 34.1 °C	August 31	29.6 °F / −1.3 °C	December 25	
1901	96 °F / 35.6 °C	July 30	25.8 °F / −3.4 °C	February 15	
1900	91.9 °F / 33.3 °C	July 22	30 °F / −1.1 °C	December 18	
1899	92.6 °F / 33.7 °C	July 24	29.8 °F / −1.2 °C	December 11	
1898	93.5 °F / 34.2 °C	August 23	28 °F / −2.2 °C	December 26	
1897	97.7 °F / 36.5 °C	July 2	27.3 °F / −2.6 °C	December 24	
1896	94.8 °F / 34.9 °C	August 6	28.2 °F / −2.1 °C	January 27	
1895	93.5 °F / 34.2 °C	July 4	22.8 °F / −5.1 °C	February 18	
1894	97.5 °F / 36.4 °C	July 25	26.2 °F / −3.2 °C	January 1	
1893	94.4 °F / 34.7 °C	August 24	22.1 °F / −5.5 °C	January 14	
1892	95 °F / 35 °C	July 31	25.1 °F / −3.8 °C	December 7	
1891	92.1 °F / 33.4 °C	July 20	23 °F / −5 °C	January 20	
1890	96.2 °F / 35.7 °C	August 24	27.1 °F / −2.7 °C	December 16	
1889	93.7 °F / 34.3 °C	July 13	27.8 °F / −2.3 °C	January 6	
1888	93.7 °F / 34.3 °C	August 15	26.9 °F / −2.8 °C	January 22	
1887	99.1 °F / 37.3 °C	July 23	24.8 °F / −4 °C	February 19	
1886	93 °F / 33.9 °C	July 23	29.3 °F / −1.5 °C	March 12	
1885	98 °F / 36.7 °C	August 7	26.4 °F / −3.1 °C	December 14	
1884	96.8 °F / 35 °C	July 18	27.5 °F / −2.5 °C	January 4	
1883	94.1 °F / 34.5 °C	July 13	24.2 °F / −4.3 °C	January 26	
1882	90.6 °F / 32.6 °C	July 22	26.2 °F / −3.2 °C	February 4	
1881	95.7 °F / 35.4 °C	August 24	29.3 °F / −1.5 °C	February 15	
1880	96.9 °F / 36.1 °C	July 21	21.7 °F / −5.7 °C	January 22	
1879	95.5 °F / 35.3 °C	August 3	25.5 °F / −3.6 °C	December 12	
1878	94.2 °F / 34.6 °C	August 31	27.5 °F / −2.5 °C	January 29	
1877	97.5 °F / 36.4 °C	August 26	26.6 °F / −2 °C	March 4	
1876	93.2 °F / 34 °C	August 7	22.8 °F / −5.1 °C	January 6	
1875	91.9 °F / 33.3 °C	July 6	24.8 °F / −4 °C	February 9	
1874	94.8 °F / 34.9 °C	July 9	25.5 °F / −3.6 °C	January 1	
1873	96.2 °F / 35.7 °C	July 31	28.4 °F / −2 °C	December 31	
1872	93.9 °F / 34.4 °C	July 30	28.4 °F / −2 °C	January 3	
1871	93.2 °F / 34 °C	July 24	25.1 °F / −3.8 °C	December 10	
1870	93.3 °F / 34.1 °C	July 11	23.3 °F / −4.8 °C	January 29	
1869	95.3 °F / 35.2 °C	July 31	21.2 °F / −6 °C	January 23	
1868	94.1 °F / 34.5 °C	August 16	30.9 °F / −0.6 °C	February 19	
1867	93.7 °F / 34.3 °C	July 16	26.6 °F / −2 °C	December 29	
1866	93.7 °F / 34.3 °C	July 17	29.8 °F / −1.2 °C	December 25	
1865	97.3 °F / 36.3 °C	August 26	26.9 °F / −2.8 °C	February 25	
1864	95.1 °F / 35.1 °C	July 13	23 °F / −5 °C	January 18	
1863	95.3 °F / 35.2 °C	August 9	29.8 °F / −1.2 °C	February 17	
1862	93.2 °F / 34 °C	July 30	25.1 °F / −3.8 °C	January 8	
