= Clement Schrader =

German Jesuit theologian

Clement Schrader (November 1820 at Itzum, in Hanover, Germany – 23 February 1875 at Poitiers, France) was a German Jesuit theologian.

== Life ==
Schrader studied at the German College at Rome (1840–48) and entered the Society of Jesus on 17 May 1848. For a time he filled the post of prefect of studies in the German College; subsequently he lectured in the Roman College on dogmatic theology, and later on joined the theological faculty of Vienna.

In 1867 he became a member of the theological commission appointed to prepare the preliminary drafts for the First Vatican Council. On his refusal to take the oath of fidelity to the Constitution of 1867 he was, not long after the council had been prorogued, deprived of his professorship by the Austrian Government.

The remainder of his life was devoted to the teaching of theology at the University of Poitiers, where he succumbed to an attack of pneumonia.

== Works ==
Schrader's grasp of scholastic theology is evidenced by many works. Chief among these are:

- "De Deo Creante";
- "De triplici Ordine"; eight series of these, dealing with various theological questions, e.g. predestination, actual grace, faith, human society;
- "De unitate Romana" (according to Hurter, his ablest work).

He assisted Carlo Passaglia in several of his works, notably in the latter's treatise on the Immaculate Conception. He was also actively engaged in the conduct of a periodical published at Vienna (1864–67), and entitled Der Papst und die modernen Ideen. He translated the Syllabus of Pope Pius IX into German and gave a number of counter propositions added with a view to bringing out in clearer light the exact significance of the Syllabus.
