= Giovanni Vincenzo Bolgeni =

Italian Jesuit and theologian (1733–1811)

- Born: 22 January 1733; Bergamo, Republic of Venice
- Died: 3 May 1811; Rome, Papal States
- Occupations: Theologian, teacher, Catholic theologian
- Movement: Counter-revolution

Giovanni Vincenzo Bolgeni (22 January 1733 in Bergamo, Italy – 3 May 1811 in Rome, Italy) was a Jesuit theologian and controversialist.

== Life ==
He entered the Society of Jesus on 31 October 1747, taught theology and philosophy in Macerata, and was a member of the Society when it was suppressed by Clement XIV. Henceforth he devoted himself to theological argument, and in recognition of his signal services against Jansenism and Josephinism, Pius IV appointed him Theologian-Penitentiary, an office of which he was deprived by Pius VII on account of the Jacobin principles he tolerated and advocated during the occupation of Rome by Napoleon I.

== Works ==
Of Bolgeni's theological writings, the best known was Della carità o amor di Dio (Rome, 1788). In it he endeavored to refute the Dominican de Rubeis by arguing that the theological virtue of charity consists in loving God as he is good to us and not as he is absolute goodness. This position won for him criticism from Teofilo Cristiani, fictitious author of Lettera teologico-critica sull'amor di Dio (1791) that he held purely servile fear a sufficient motive for attrition, and from his former Jesuit comrades Mazzarelli (1790–91), Regono (1791), Cortes (1790–93), Chantre y Herrera (1790–92) and Gentilini (1803). He did not attempt to answer the searching criticism of his doctrine contained in Palestrina's Idea genuina della carità o amor di Dio (1800).

In addition to his original work he contributed to the controversy, Schiarimenti in confermazione e difesa della sua dissertazione (Rome, 1788, Foligno, 1790), and Apologia dell'amor di Dio detto di concupiscenza (Foligno, 1792). As Theologian-Penitentiary he edited a novel defense of probabilism under the caption Il possesso, principio fondamentale per decidere i casi morali. The second part of this work, Dissertazione seconda fra le morali sopra gli atti umani (Cremona, 1816; Orvieto, 1853), together with a treatise on usury, published under his name but probably not written by him, appeared after his death. The defense of probabilism aroused a storm of controversy, and among the noted anti-probabilists who engaged in the discussion may be mentioned the Bishop of Assisi (1798), Gaetano De Folgore (1798), Canon John Trinch of the Cathedral of Trivoli (1850), and Montbach (1857). Of these Trinch added to his Il Bolgenismo Confuto a "digression on the necessity of confessing all mortal sins, whether certain or doubtful, just as they are in conscience."

== Attacks on Jansenism, Josephinism, and Jacobinism ==
Not long after the suppression of the Society of Jesus, he entered the lists with the Society's traditional enemy, Jansenism, by publishing Esame della vera idea della Santa Sede (Macerata, 1785; Foligno, 1791), a work undertaken in criticism of the Jansenistic doctrines contained in La Vera Idea della Santa Sede by Pietro Tamburini, a professor of the University of Paris. Several replies to the criticisms of Tamburini and to the censures of the Archpriest Guadagnini were published in rapid succession. In 1787, he wrote Stato de' bambini morti senza battesimo, and in it attacked the doctrine of Guadagnini that infants dying without Baptism are doomed to the torments of Hell. This controversy over, he devoted his pen to defending the juridical powers of the hierarchy, cataloging the errors of the day, and combating the principles of Josephinism in Austria and of the Revolution in France.

His publications at this period were: Fatti dommatici ossia dell'infallibilità della chiesa nel decidere sulla dottrina buona, o cattiva de' libri (Brescia, 1788); Specchio istorico da servire di preservativo contro gli errori correnti (1789); L'episcopato ossia della potestà di governare la Chiesa (1789). These literary labors led to his appointment by Pius VI as Theologian-Penitentiary and in this capacity his issued a defense of L'episcopato (Rome, 1791) and Dissertazione sulla giurisdizione ecclesiastica (Rome, 1791), a refutation of George Sicard's contention that the powers of orders and jurisdiction were identical. About the same time he renewed his attacks on Guadagnini and Tamburini, refuting what he saw as the former's state-deifying proclivities in L'Economia della Fede Cristiana (Brescia, 1790) and the latter's anti-ecclesiasticism in Problema se i Giansenisti siano Giacobini (Rome, 1794). L'Economia della Fede Cristiana was incorporated by Jacques Paul Migne in his Démonstrations Evangéliques, vol. XVIII.

After Napoleon I seized Rome, Bolgeni favored the anti-regal oath of allegiance imposed by the conqueror. He defended this change of front, but was obliged to make a retraction in the presence of the cardinals assembled at Vienna for the election of a pope. His writings during this stage of his career were:

- Parere sui giuramento civico (Rome, 1798);
- Sentimenti de' professori della università del Collegio Romano sopra il giuramento prescritto dalla Repubblica Romana (Rome, an. VII);
- Sentimenti sul giuramento civico (Rome, an. VII)
- Metamorfosi del dott. Gio. Marchetti, da penitenziere mutato in penitente (1800)
- Parere . . . sull'alienazione de' beni ecclesiastici;
- Schiarimenti to confirm the preceding.

After his death, a work was edited, believed by some to be from his pen, Dei limiti delle due potestà ecclesiastica e secolare (Florence, 1849), and it was put on the index donec corrigatur. It is most probably unauthentic.
