= Little Office of the Blessed Virgin Mary =

Liturgical devotion

The Little Office of the Blessed Virgin Mary, also known as Hours of the Virgin, is a liturgical devotion to the Blessed Virgin Mary, in imitation of, and usually in addition to, the Divine Office in the Catholic Church. It is a cycle of psalms, hymns, scripture and other readings.

All of the daily variation occurs in Matins. The text of the other offices remains the same from day to day in the Roman Rite and most other rites and uses. In the Roman Rite there are seasonal variations in Advent and Christmastide. The Gospel antiphons also change in Eastertide, although there are no other changes during that season. The Little Office was a core text of the medieval and early Reformation primers, a type of lay devotional.

== History ==
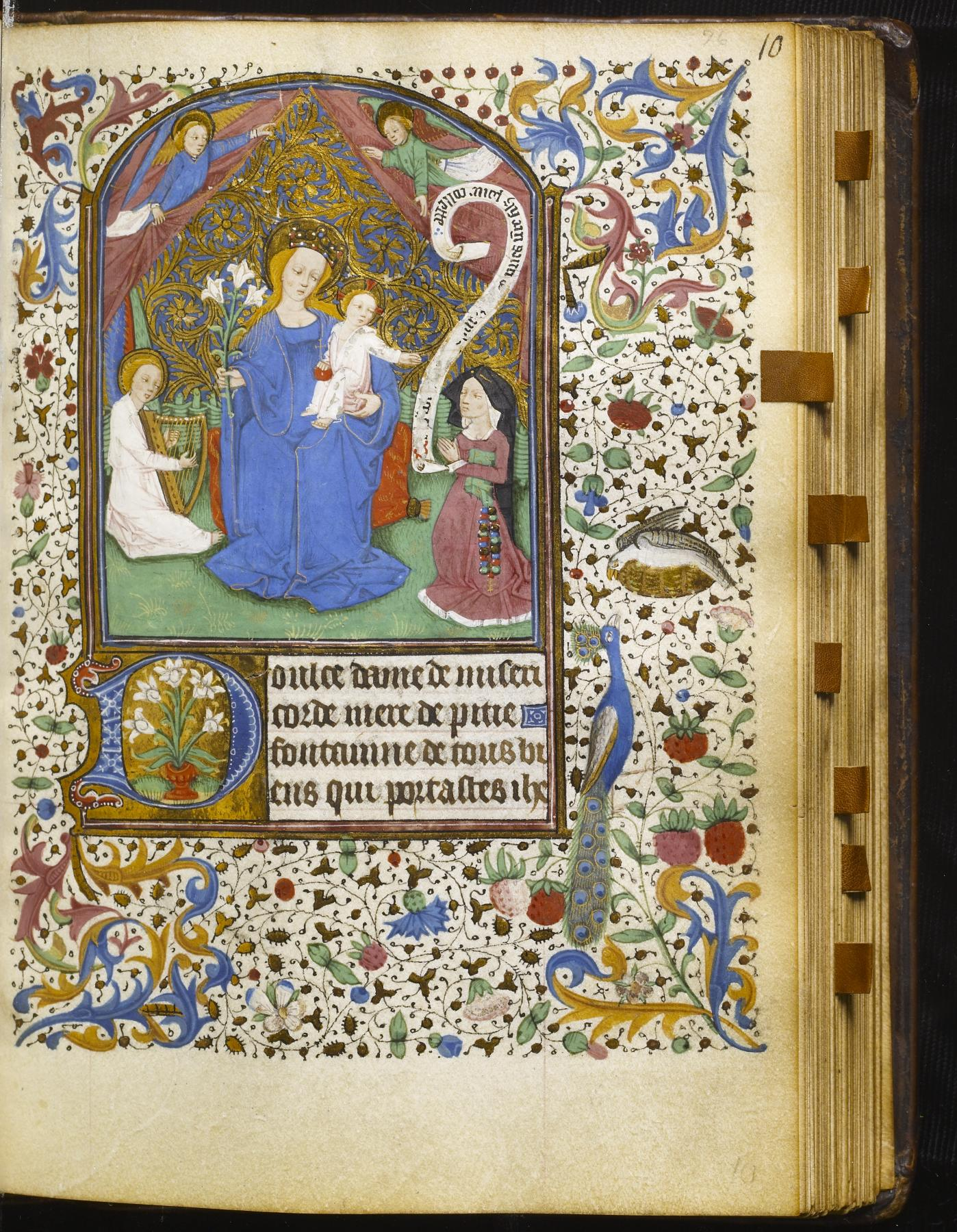
French - Leaf from Book of Hours - about 1460, Walters Art Museum

The Little Office probably originated as a monastic devotion around the middle of the eighth century. Peter the Deacon reports that at the Benedictine Monastery of Monte Cassino there was, in addition to the Divine Office, another office "which it is customary to perform in honour of the Holy Mother of God, which Zachary the Pope commanded under strict precept to the Cassinese Monastery."

The Little Office of the Blessed Virgin Mary is a variation of the Common of the Blessed Virgin Mary in the Liturgy of the Hours (Divine Office). It may have originally been put together to be prayed in connection with the Votive Masses of Our Lady on Saturday, which were written by Alcuin, the liturgical master of Charlemagne’s court.

The Little Office did not come into general use before the tenth century. Peter Damian states that it was already commonly recited amongst the secular clergy of Italy and France, and through his influence the practice of reciting it in choir after the Monastic Office, was introduced into several Italian houses. In the eleventh century there were at least two versions of the Little Office extant in England. Pre-English Reformation versions varied considerably, and in England in medieval times the main differences were between the Sarum and York uses. Several early printed versions of the English uses of the Little Office survive in the Primers.

In the twelfth century, the new foundation of the Augustinian Canons of Prémontré prescribed the Little Office in addition to the eight hours of the Divine Office. The Austin Canons also used it, and, perhaps through their influence, it developed from a private devotion into part of the daily duty of the secular clergy as well in the thirteenth and fourteenth centuries. By the fourteenth century the Little Office was obligatory for all the clergy. This obligation remained until St. Pius V changed it in 1568. The Little Office varied in different communities and locations, but was standardized by Pius V in 1585. It became part of the Books of Hours in Mary’s honour and was used by many lay people. Beautifully decorated Books of Hours were the pride of many a noble. Women’s congregations and Third Orders often made it mandatory for their members to pray the Little Office.

Down to the Reformation it formed a central part of the primer and was customarily recited by devout laity, by whom the practice was continued for long afterwards among Catholics. After the revision of the Roman Breviary following the Council of Trent in 1545, the Little Office became an obligation for the ordained only on Saturdays but with the exception of Ember Saturdays, vigils, and the Saturdays of Lent.

An English-only version appears appended to versions of Bishop Richard Challoner's "Garden of the Soul" in the eighteenth century, and with the restoration of the hierarchy in the 1860s, James Burns issued a Latin and English edition.

Minor revisions of the Office occurred in the twentieth century, most notably in 1910, as part of Pope Pius X's liturgical reforms, when the Little Office was suppressed as an epilogue of the Divine Office. In accordance with Pius X's apostolic constitution Divino afflatu of 1910, the Psalter of both the Breviary and the Little Office was rearranged, producing a different distribution of psalms to be recited at the Little Office than in pre-1910 editions.

=== Following the Second Vatican Council ===
In 1963, following the Second Vatican Council, Pope Paul VI promulgated Sacrosanctum Concilium which stated: "Members of any institute dedicated to acquiring perfection who, according to their constitutions, are to recite any parts of the divine office are thereby performing the public prayer of the Church. They too perform the public prayer of the Church who, in virtue of their constitutions, recite any short office, provided this is drawn up after the pattern of the divine office and is duly approved."

However, in the subsequent reforms following the Second Vatican Council, the Little Office was overshadowed by the revised Liturgy of the Hours. The Little Office was not officially revised after the Council, as many Congregations abandoned it in order to adopt the Liturgy of the Hours. According to Pope Paul VI's later Apostolic Letter Ecclesiae sanctae of 6 August 1966, "although Religious who recite a duly approved Little Office perform the public prayer of the Church (cf. Constitution Sacrosanctum Concilium, No. 98), it is nevertheless recommended to the institutes that in place of the Little Office they adopt the Divine Office either in part or in whole so that they may participate more intimately in the liturgical life of the Church".

Nonetheless, several post-conciliar editions continue to be issued. The Carmelites produced a revised version of their form of the office, which is still used by some Religious and those who are enrolled in the Brown Scapular. Additionally Tony Horner, a layman, and John Rotelle, a priest, both formulated their own editions of the Little Office which conformed to the revised Liturgy of the Hours, both of these are approved for private use. These newer versions include vernacular translations from the Latin and follow the new structure of each Hour in the Office. Carthusians continue to recite the Office of the Virgin Mary in addition to the Divine Office.

At the same time, despite its decline among religious orders after the Council, the traditional Little Office in English and Latin continue to be printed. Carmel Books in the United Kingdom and several other publishers issued editions usually containing the text as it was in the 1950s. St. Bonaventure Publications publishes an edition edited by Francis Xavier Lasance and originally issued in 1904, which gives the office as it was before Pius X's revision of the Psalter. Baronius Press publishes the 1961 text, which is the most recent edition, in a bilingual English and Latin edition, collecting all the Gregorian chant for the office for the first time in a published edition; while Angelus Press, the publishing arm of the Society of Saint Pius X, also publishes an English/Latin edition of the 1961 text; unlike the Baronius edition, this version includes pronunciation marks for the Latin text, as well as Matins, Lauds, and Vespers of the traditional Office of the Dead. Other publishers like St. Bonaventure Publications make editions available according to the 1910 text, before the reforms of Pius X.

=== Devotion to the Little Office ===
Saints throughout history who have prayed the Little Office regularly as part of their spiritual practice include:

- Thérèse of Lisieux
- Pier Giorgio Frassati
- Solanus Casey

== Structure ==
- Matins
- Lauds
- Prime
- Terce
- Sext
- None
- Vespers
- Compline

== See also ==
- Book of hours
- Canonical hours
- Liturgy of the Hours
