= Ennio Quirino Visconti Liceo Ginnasio =

School in Rome

Coordinates: 41.8981°N 12.4803°E

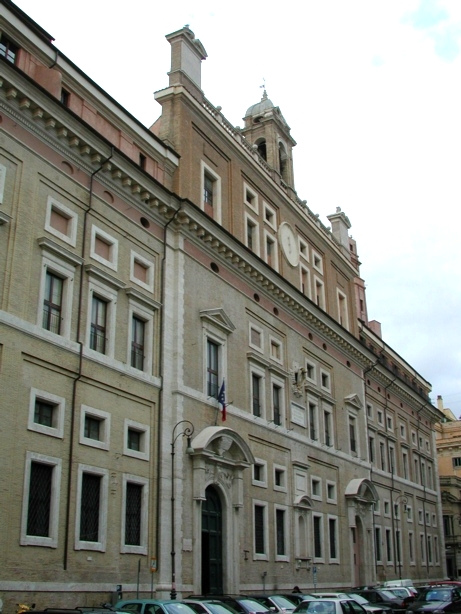
- The facade of the liceo
- Rome; Italy

Information
- Type: Public school (government funded)
- Established: 1871

The Ennio Quirino Visconti Liceo Ginnasio ("Ennio Quirino Visconti Lyceum–Gymnasium") is the oldest and most prestigious liceo classico in Rome, also known as Roman College due to its previous historical role.

== History ==
The liceo was set up shortly after the Capture of Rome in 1871 in the building that had housed the Jesuit Roman College. It was dedicated to the famous Roman archaeologist Ennio Quirino Visconti, who had supported the Francophile Roman Republic at the end of the 18th century.

In 1938, science teacher Maria Piazza was forced to leave her teaching position and 58 Jewish students were expelled under the racial laws imposed by the fascist regime. A commemorative plaque installed in 2019 recalls the victims of state anti-Semitism.

== See also ==
- Liceo classico
- List of Jesuit sites
