= Marian Dobmayer =

German Benedictine theologian

Marian Dobmayer (24 October 1753 at Schwandorf, Bavaria – 21 December 1805 at Amberg, Bavaria) was a German Benedictine theologian.

== Life ==
He first entered the Society of Jesus, and after its suppression in 1773 joined the Benedictines in the monastery of Weissenohe, Diocese of Bamberg. There he was professed in 1775, and in 1778 ordained priest.

He was successively professor of philosophy at Neuberg, Bavaria (1781–87), of dogmatic theology and ecclesiastical history at Amberg (1787–94), and of dogmatic theology and patrology at the University of Ingolstadt (1794–99). On the reorganization of the latter school in 1799 he returned his monastery of Weissenohe, where he remained until its secularization. He them retired to Amberg, where he taught theology until his death.

== Works ==
In 1789 he published at Amberg a Conspectus Theologiæ Dogmaticæ. His chief work is the Systema Theologiæ Catholicæ, edited after his death by Theodor Pantaleon Senestrey in eight volumes (Sulzbach, 1807–19). The 1913 Catholic Encyclopedia describes it as "learned and moderate in its controversial parts."
