= Miguel Angel Medina =

Mexican weightlifter (born 1941)

Personal information
- Born: 8 April 1941 (age 83); Mérida, Mexico

Sport
- Sport: Weightlifting

Miguel Angel Medina (born 8 April 1941) is a Mexican weightlifter. He competed at the 1968 Summer Olympics and the 1972 Summer Olympics.
