= Heinrich Joseph Dominicus Denzinger =

German Catholic theologian

Heinrich Joseph Dominicus Denzinger (10 October 1819 – 19 June 1883) was a leading German Catholic theologian and author of the Enchiridion symbolorum et definitionum ('Handbook of creeds and definitions'), a work commonly referred to simply as Denzinger after him.

== Life ==
Denzinger was born on 10 October 1819 at Liège. In 1831 his father, who was a professor at the University of Liège, took him to Würzburg, the original home of the family. Here he attended the gymnasium and studied philosophy at the university, where he received the Ph.D. degree. In 1838 he entered the Würzburg seminary, went to the German College at Rome in 1841, was ordained priest in 1844, and the following year took a degree in theology.

On his return home, he was first curate at Hassfurt-on-the-Main, became professor extraordinary of dogmatic theology at Würzburg in 1848, and ordinary professor in 1854. He continued to occupy this position, in spite of ill-health, until his death. Denzinger was one of the pioneers of positive theology and historical dogmatic (Dogmengeschichte) in Catholic Germany. In the generation after Johann Adam Mohler (d. 1838) and Döllinger (1799-1890) he carried on their methods and helped to establish what was the special character of the German school, exact investigation of the historical development of theology, rather than philosophical speculation about the corollaries of dogma.

He died on 19 June 1883 at Würzburg.

== Enchiridion symbolorum et definitionum ==
Nearly all of his important works are in the nature of historical theology. The best-known and most useful is his Enchiridion symbolorum et definitionum (first ed., Würzburg, 1854), a handbook containing a collection of the chief decrees and definitions of councils, list of condemned propositions, etc., beginning with the oldest forms of the Apostles' Creed. The first edition contained 128 documents; by the sixth edition, the last edited by Denzinger himself, that number had increased to 202.

After Denzinger's death, Professor Ignaz Stahl continued the work of re-editing the Enchiridion with additional decrees of Leo XIII. Clemens Bannwart, S.J., prepared a revised and enlarged edition (10th ed., Freiburg) in 1908.

Since then, the Enchiridion has been repeatedly republished, with considerable additions by different editors. As a result, the numberings in more recent editions in no way correspond to those in the original. The numbering that scholars in recent decades (since 1963) have usually cited for the entries is that introduced in the edition prepared by Adolf Schönmetzer, S.J., which explains the abbreviation "DS" (for "Denzinger-Schönmetzer") that is used to specify this numbering, which is very different from that in earlier editions. Peter Hünermann is the most recent editor and the 43rd edition has been published in English by Ignatius Press.

The latest editions have added doctrinal statements of the second half of the twentieth century, including the teachings of the Second Vatican Council and recent Popes.

== Other works ==
Other works by Denzinger include:

- Ritus Orientalium, Coptorum, Syrorum et Armenorum (2 vols., Würzburg, 1863–1864), a long treatise on Eastern rites
- Vier Bücher von der religiösen Erkenntniss (2 vols., Würzburg, 1856–1857)
- Über die Aechtheit des bisherigen Textes der Ignatianischen Briefe (Würzburg, 1849)
- Die spekulative Theologie Günthers (Würzburg, 1853)

He also wrote a number of shorter treatises, on Philo Judaeus (1840, his first work), on the Immaculate Conception (1855), and papal infallibility (1870). At the time of his death he was preparing a complete compendium of dogmatic theology.

Denzinger edited a number of theological works:

- Habert, Theologia Graecorum Patrum vindicata circa materiam gratiae (1853)
- De Rubeis, De peccato originali, (1857)
- Prudentius Maran, Divinitas D. N. Jesu Christi (1859).

He was appointed a consultor of Propaganda for Eastern rites in 1866.
