= Francis Xavier Patrizi =

Italian Jesuit exegete

Francis Xavier Patrizi (Rome, 19 June 1797 – Rome, 23 April 1881) was an Italian Jesuit exegete.

== Life ==
He was the eldest son and heir of the Giovanni Patrizi Naro Montoro, VIII marchese di Montoro and Princess Kunegunde of Saxony. He entered the Society of Jesus on 12 November 1814, was ordained priest in 1824, and soon became professor of Sacred Scripture and Hebrew in the Roman College. The revolution of 1848 caused Patrizi and his fellow professor Perrone to take refuge in England. Here, and afterwards at the Catholic University of Leuven, Patrizi taught Scriptures to the Jesuit scholastics. When peace was restored at Rome, he again began to lecture in the Roman College. The revolution of 1870 ended his career as a teacher, and he found a home in the German-Hungarian College of Rome, remaining there till death.

== Works ==
He wrote twenty-one biblical and ascetical works. Of the former the most important are:

- De interpretatione scriptararum sacrarum (2 vols., Rome, 1844)
- De consensu utriusque libri Machabæorum (Rome, 1856)
- De Evangeliis (3 vols., Freiburg im Breisgau, 1853)
- In Joannem commentarium (Rome, 1857)
- In Marcum commentarium (Rome, 1862)
- In Actus Apostolorum commentarium (Commentary on the Acts of the Apostles; Rome, 1867)
- Cento salmi tradotti litteralmente dal testo ebraico e commentati (a translation of the Psalms; Rome, 1875)
- De interpretatione oraculorum ad Christum pertinentium (Rome, 1853)
- De immaculata Mariæ origine (Origin of the Virgin Mary; Rome, 1853)
- Delle parole di San Paolo: In quo omnes peccaverunt (Rome, 1876)

His Latin is classical and found to be plodding by some. His work on interpretation has gone through many editions. The Gospel commentaries were meant especially to refute the Rationalism of the time.
