= Hallier =

Hallier is a surname. Notable people with the surname include:

- Ernst Hallier (1831–1904), German botanist and mycologist
- Jean-Edern Hallier (1936–1997), French writer, critic and editor
- Johannes Gottfried Hallier (1868–1932), German botanist
- Lori Hallier (born 1959), Canadian film, stage and television actress

== See also ==
- Château du Hallier, is a castle in the commune of Nibelle in the Loiret département of France
