= Xantes Mariales =

Italian Dominican theologian

Xantes Mariales (born Sante Pinardi; Venice c. 1580 – Venice, 17 April 1660) was an Italian Dominican theologian.

== Life ==
He was of a noble Venetian family. At an early age he entered the Dominican convent of Sts. John and Paul. Remarkable for his versatility and prodigious memory, he was sent to Spain, where he completed his studies.

He first taught at Venice, then at Padua where he three times exercised the office of regent. He was twice exiled by the Venetian senate, for showing excessive support for the Papacy. At Milan, Ferrara, and Bologna where he took refuge, he was highly esteemed.

From 1624 onwards he led a retired life at Venice, devoting his time to prayer, reading, and study. He died at Venice from apoplexy.

== Works ==
Among his works are:

- Controversiæ ad universam Summam theol. S. Th. Aq. (Venice, 1624)
- Amplissimum artium scientiarumque omnium amphitheatrum (Bologna, 1658).
