= Ludwig Ott =

German Roman Catholic theologian

The Reverend Ludwig Ott
- Born: August 24, 1906; Neumarkt-St. Helena, German Empire
- Died: August 25, 1985 (aged 79); Eichstätt, West Germany
- Occupations: Priest, professor, writer
- Writing career
- Notable work: Fundamentals of Catholic Dogma

Ludwig Ott (24 October 1906 – 25 October 1985) was a Roman Catholic theologian and medievalist from Bavaria, Germany.

== Biography ==
After training at the Catholic University of Eichstätt-Ingolstadt, Ott was ordained a Catholic priest in 1930. He received his doctorate in Munich (1931-1936) under Martin Grabmann and was mentored by him in studying the development of medieval theology. In 1936 he was außerordentlicher Professor, and in 1941 an ordentlicher Professor of dogmatics at the episcopal philosophical and theological college in Eichstätt. From 1960 to 1962 he was the rector of this Catholic university.

His research centered mostly in the area of dogmatics. With his Fundamentals of Catholic Dogma he produced a standard reference work on dogmatics. The work, popular with both clergy and laity, has been translated into more than ten languages. The "Foreword to the Second English Edition" (p. vii) says, "This second English edition embodies the many changes made in the second and third German editions."

== Works ==
- Ott, Ludwig. Fundamentals of Catholic Dogma. 1955. Ed. James Bastible. Trans. Patrick Lynch. 2nd ed. St. Louis: B. Herder, 1957. Rpt. Rockford, IL: TAN Books, 1974 (most recently, 2009). Rpt. Fort Collins, CO: Roman Catholic Books, 2012 (hardback). (German: Grundriß der Katholischen Dogmatik. Freiburg: Herder, 1952.) (1952 original: ISBN 978-1-929291-85-4.)
