= Johann Baptist Franzelin =

Austrian Jesuit theologian and Cardinal

His Eminence Johannes Baptist Franzelin S.J.
- Prefect of the Congregation of Indulgences and Sacred Relics
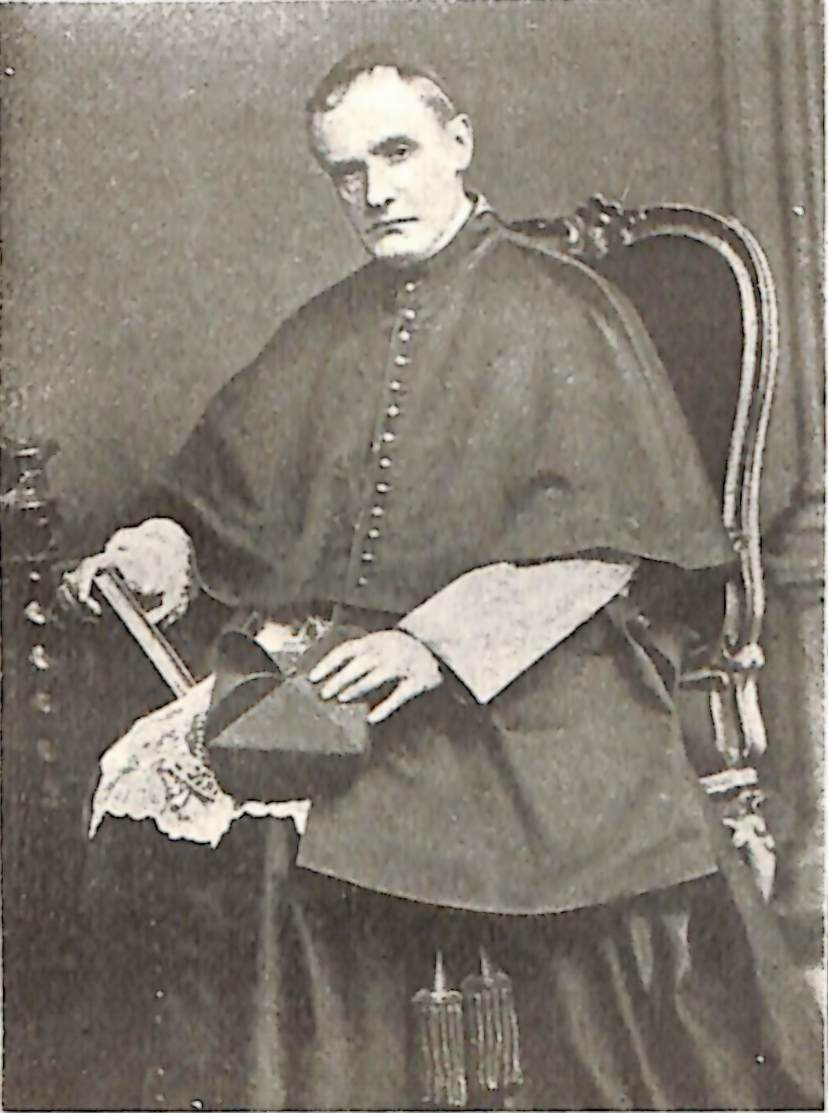
- Church: Roman Catholic Church
- Appointed: 28 March 1885
- Term ended: 11 December 1886
- Predecessor: Luigi Oreglia di Santo Stefano
- Successor: Tommaso Maria Zigliara
- Other post: Cardinal-Priest of Santi Bonifacio ed Alessio (1876-86)

Orders
- Ordination: 23 December 1849
- Created cardinal: 3 April 1876 by Pope Pius IX
- Rank: Cardinal-Priest

Personal details
- Born: Johann Baptist Franzelin; 15 April 1816 Aldein, County of Tyrol
- Died: 11 December 1886 (aged 70) Rome, Kingdom of Italy
- Parents: Pellegrino Franzelin; Anna Weiser
- Education: Collegio Romano; Pontifical Gregorian University

Johannes Baptist Franzelin (15 April 1816 – 11 December 1886) was an Austrian Jesuit theologian and Cardinal. A papal theologian at the First Vatican Council, he assisted with drafting the Apostolic Constitutions composed during the council.

== Life ==
Johann Baptist Franzelin was born 15 April 1816, in Aldein, Austria, the son of Pellegrino and Anna Wieser Franzelin. Despite their poverty, his parents sent him at an early age to the neighboring Franciscan college at Bolzano. In 1834, he entered the Society of Jesus at Graz, and after some years spent in higher studies and teaching in Austrian Poland began in 1845 his course of theology in the Roman college of the Society, where he acted as an assistant in Hebrew, in which he was especially proficient.

Driven from Rome by the revolution of 1848, he went successively to England, Belgium, and France, where he was ordained in 1849. In 1850, he returned to the Roman college as assistant professor of dogma and lecturer on Arabic, Syriac, and Chaldean. In 1853, he became prefect of studies in the German college, and, in 1857, professor of dogmatic theology in the Roman college, where he remained for nineteen years, winning for himself by his lectures and publications a foremost place among the theologians of that time. During this period, he acted as Consultor to several Roman Congregations and aided in the preliminaries of the First Vatican Council. In 1876, despite his protests, he was raised to the cardinalate by Pope Pius IX, and participated in the papal conclave of 1878 which elected Pope Leo XIII.

Though of delicate health, the appointment made little change in his scrupulously simple lifestyle. As a cardinal, his sole departure from strict adherence to the Jesuit rule was to omit the daily recreation. Moreover, though constantly engaged as prefect of the Congregation of Indulgences and Relics and consultor of several other congregations, he steadily refused the aid of a secretary. His entire income as cardinal he distributed among the poor, the foreign missions, and converts whose property had been seized by the Italian government.

Cardinal Franzelin died in Rome on 11 December 1886. On the centenary of his death, his remains were exhumed and transferred to the parish church of his native Aldein.

== Works ==
As a theologian, Franzelin takes high rank. He served as papal theologian to the First Vatican Council.

From the first his works were recognized as a mine of rich material for the preacher; and for years he was accustomed to receive numerous letters from priests in all parts of the world, spontaneously acknowledging the great aid in preaching they had derived from his books. Of his works, which have gone through numerous editions, the treatise De Divina Traditione et Scriptura (Rome, 1870; 2nd rev. ed., 1875) is considered a classic. Other works include:

- De SS. Eucharistiæ Sacramento et Sacrificio (1868)
- De Sacramentis in Genere (1868)
- De Deo Trino (1869)
- De Deo Uno (1870)
- De Verbo Incarnato (1870)
- some smaller treatises, and the posthumous De Ecclesia Christi

== Sources ==
- Knorn, Bernhard (2020). "Johann Baptist Franzelin (1816–86): A Jesuit Cardinal Shaping the Official Teaching of the Church at the Time of the First Vatican Council". Journal of Jesuit Studies. 7 (4): 592–615. doi:10.1163/22141332-00704005. ISSN 2214-1324.
- Walter, Peter (1987). Johann Baptist Franzelin (1816–1886): Jesuit, Theologe, Kardinal. Ein Lebensbild (in German). Bozen: Athesia. ISBN 978-88-7014-438-3.
- Miranda, Salvador. "The Cardinals of the Holy Roman Church. Biographical Dictionary". No. 107.
- Walsh, Nicholas (1895). John Baptist Franzelin, S.J., Cardinal Priest of the Title SS. Boniface and Alexius: A Sketch and a Study. Dublin: Gill.
- Bonavenia, Giuseppe (1887). Raccolta di memorie intorno alla vita di Giovanni Battista Franzelin della Compagnia di Gesù (in Italian). Rome: Tipografia Poliglotta.
- Commentarius de Vita Eminentissimi Auctoris in Franzelin, Johann Baptist (1887). Theses de Ecclesia Christi (in Latin). Rome: Propaganda Fide.
