= Francisco Zumel =

Spanish philosopher (circa 1540–1607)

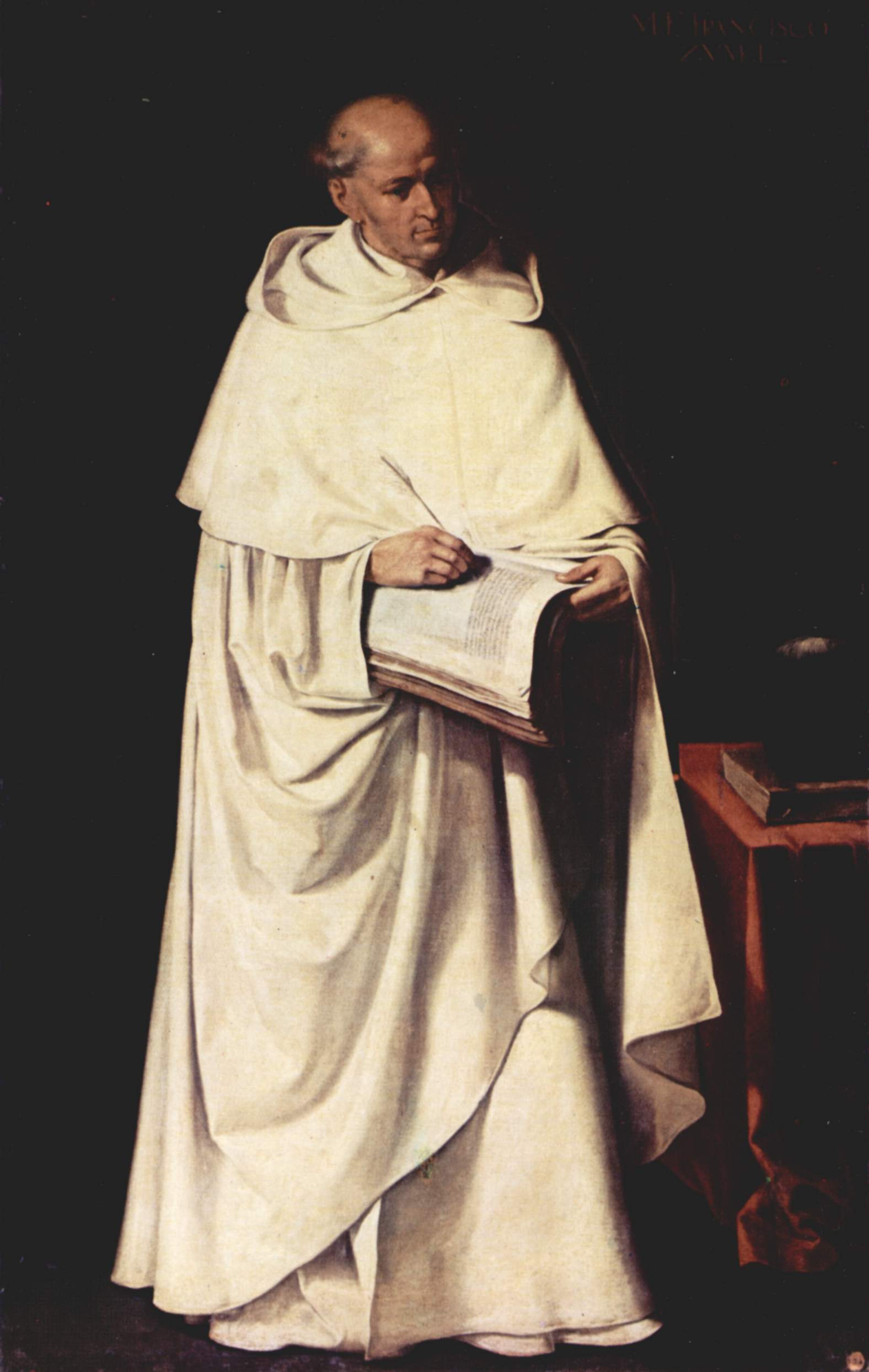
Francisco Zumel, by Francisco de Zurbarán

Francisco Zumel (c. 1540–1607) was a Spanish philosopher and ecclesiastic. He was superior general of the Mercedarian Order and professor of physics and moral philosophy at the University of Salamanca. He was a Thomist and is most remembered for his polemical writings against the molinistas, the followers of Luis Molina.

His works were written in Latin and some of them remain in the Vatican Library, and thus far unpublished.
