= Synod of Paris =

Synod of Paris or Council of Paris may refer to:

- Council of Paris (361)
- Council of Paris (551/552)
- Council of Paris (556×573)
- Council of Paris (573)
- Council of Paris (577)
- Council of Paris (614)
- Council of Paris (653)
- Council of Paris (829)
- Council of Meaux–Paris (845–846)
- Council of Paris (1429)
- Council of Paris (1528)
- Council of Paris (1811)
