= Miguel de Medina =

Spanish Franciscan Bible scholar (1489–1578)

Miguel de Medina (born at Belalcazar, Spain, 1489; died at Toledo, May, 1578) was a Spanish Franciscan theologian.

== Life ==
He entered the Franciscan order in the convent of S. Maria de Angelis at Hornachuelos, in the Sierra Morena. After his profession, he went to the College of SS. Peter and Paul at Alcalá. He received the doctor's degree from the city of Toledo, and in 1550 he was unanimously elected to the chair of Holy Scripture in the University of Alcalá.

In 1560, Philip II of Spain sent him to the Council of Trent; on his return, he became superior of St. John of the Monarchs (San Juan de los Reyes) at Toledo.

In 1553, the "Commentaries" of John Ferus were published in Rome after a strict examination. Dominicus a Soto published at Salamanca a work censuring Ferus's commentaries, selecting sixty-seven passages as deserving censure, and dedicated them to Fernando Valdés, Archbishop of Seville. Medina took up the defence of Ferus, which was published at Alcalá (1567, 1578) and Mainz (1572). This literary controversy—for no doubts were entertained of the orthodoxy of Medina—agitated the Spanish people. A process was instituted against Medina in the tribunal of the Spanish Inquisition at Toledo. He was cast in prison, where for more than five years he was subjected to great suffering and privations. His temporal afflictions and the rigour of his life brought on a severe illness, and the inquisitor-general gave orders that Medina was to be conveyed to the Convent of St. John of the Monarchs, where everything possible was to be done to preserve his life. Before the Blessed Sacrament, he made his profession of faith, calling God to witness that he never believed anything or taught anything opposed to the doctrines of the Church, "the pillar and the ground of truth". His last words were: "In te Domine speravi non confundar in aeternum".

Soon after his death, the supreme tribunal of the Inquisition issued a decree declaring that the accusations brought against Medina were without foundation.

== Works ==
His principal works are:

- Christianae paraenesis sive de recta in Deum fide libri septem (Venice, 1564);
- Disputationes de indulgentiis adversus nostri temporis haereticos ad PP. s. Concilii Trident. (Venice, 1564);
- De sacrorum hominum continentia libri V"(Venice, 1569j, written against those who advocated the necessity of permitting the German priests to follow the example of the Greeks in this matter;
- De igne purgatorio (Venice, 1569);
- De la verdadera y cristiana humilidad (Toledo, 1559).
