= Bernardo de Rossi =

Italian Dominican theologian and historian

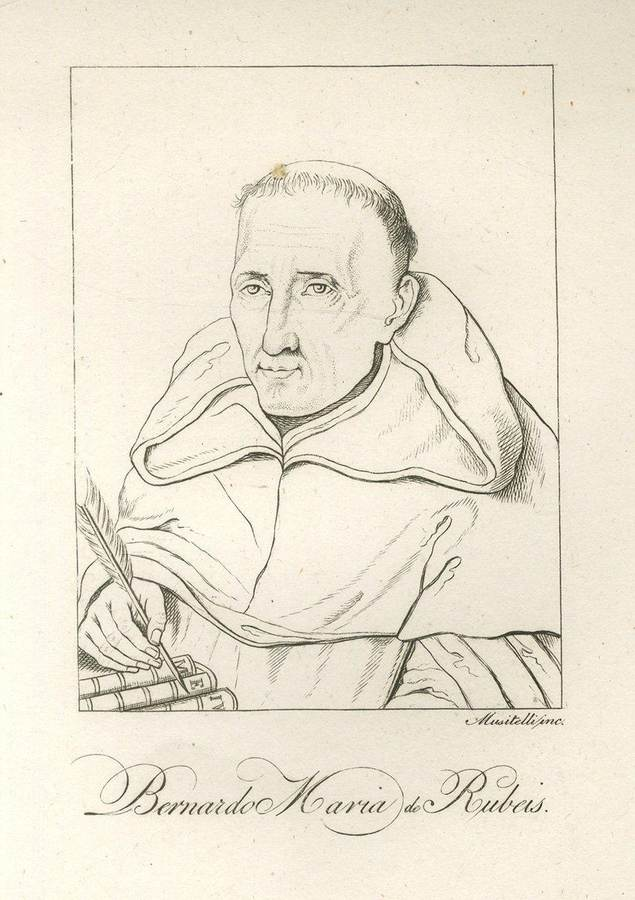
- Born: Giovanni Francesco de Rossi; 8 January 1687; Cividale del Friuli, Republic of Venice
- Died: 25 January 1775; Venice, Republic of Venice
- Occupations: Historian, librarian, theologian, philologist, Catholic theologian

Bernardo de Rossi (8 January 1687 – 2 February 1775) was an Italian Dominican theologian and historian.

== Biography ==
Rossi was born at Cividale del Friuli. He made his religious profession with the Dominicans at Conegliano in 1704, after which he studied at Florence and Venice. He taught at Venice for fifteen years, and was twice general vicar of his province. In 1722, he was theologian to a Venetian embassy to Louis XV and remained in Paris five months. He resigned his chair in 1730 and devoted the remainder of his life to literary activity. He died in Venice.

His sanctity and learning won for him a wide reputation, and his correspondence with the great men of his time fills nine volumes. His works, written in elegant Latin, show a vast erudition and a mind at once critical and profound. Amongst his dogmatic writings must be mentioned De Peccato Originali (1757).

He is famous especially for his new edition of the works of Thomas Aquinas with a commentary (1745–60, 24 vols.). He was also the author of thirty-two dissertations on the life and writings of Aquinas, which have been placed in the first volume of the Leonine Edition of Aquinas's works.

De Rossi also ranks high as a writer on historical, patristic, and liturgical subjects. Besides his numerous works that were published, he left thirty volumes in manuscript.
