= Giovanni Perrone =

Italian Jesuit and theologian (1794–1876)

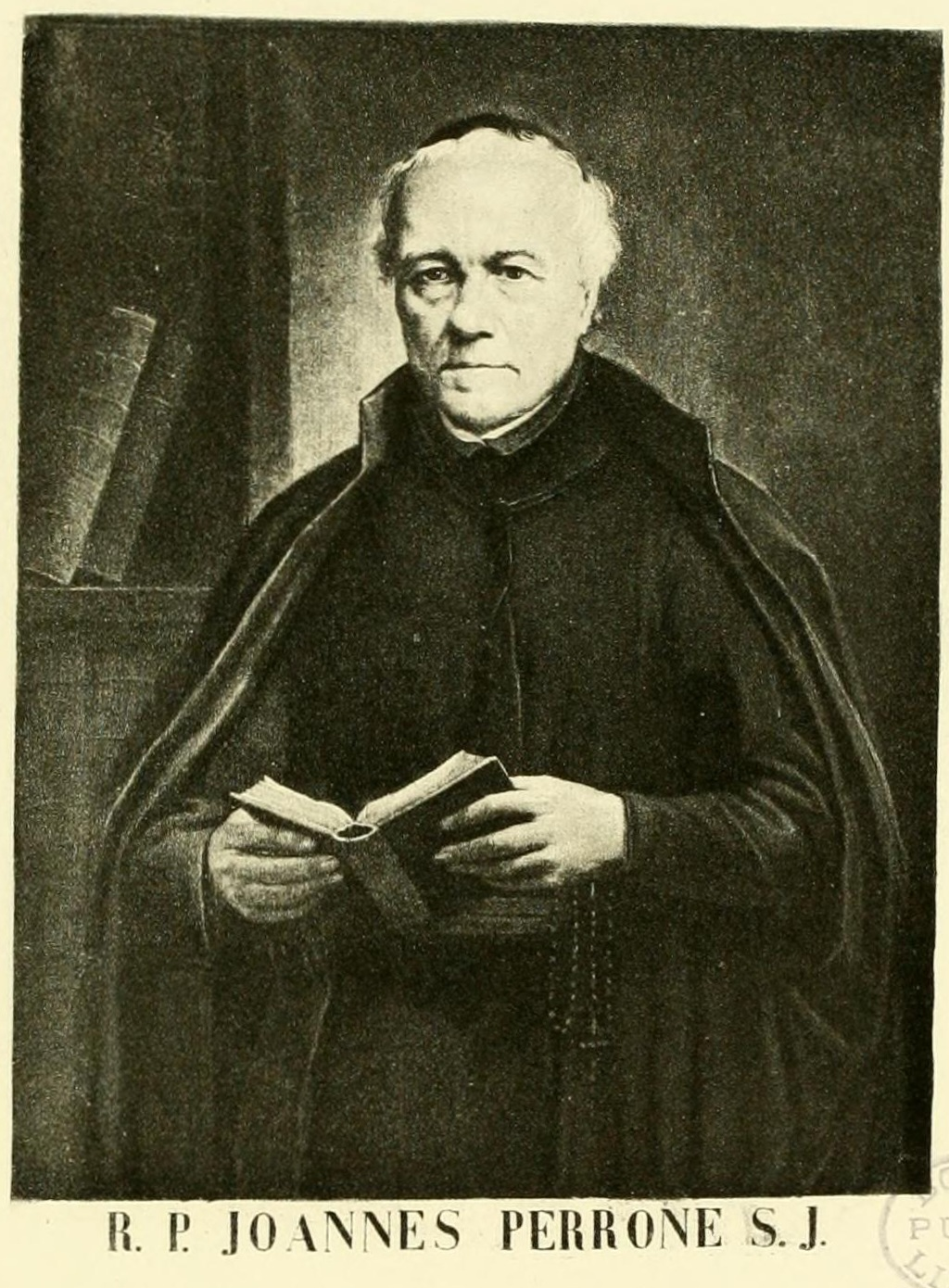
Giovanni Perrone

Giovanni Perrone (11 March 1794 – 26 August 1876) was an Italian Jesuit and renowned theologian.

== Life ==
Perrone was born in Chieri, Piedmont. After studying theology and obtaining a doctorate at Turin, he entered the Society of Jesus in Rome at age 21, on 14 December 1815. The Society had been re-established by Pope Pius VII only a year before, and Perrone was very soon appointed to teach theology at Orvieto. In 1824 he became professor of dogmatic theology at the Roman College, where he taught the future Pope Leo XIII.

In 1830 he was made rector of the Jesuit college in Ferrara, but was recalled to the Roman College in 1838. Beginning in 1847, Perrone corresponded at length with John Henry Newman, particularly on the development of doctrine.

The Roman Republic of 1849 forced him to seek refuge in England. After an exile of three years, Perrone again took the chair of dogma in the Roman College, being made head of his former college in 1850. He taught theology until prevented by old age. An advisor to Popes Gregory XVI and Pius IX, he was consultor of various congregations and was active in opposing some teachings of George Hermes as well as the discussions which ended in 1854 in the dogmatic definition of the Immaculate Conception. From 1869 he was prominent on the Ultramontane side at Vatican Council I.

== Works ==
Of Perrone's many writings, the most important is the Prælectiones Theologicæ, which reached a thirty-fourth edition in nine volumes. The compendium which Perrone made of this work reached forty-seven editions in two volumes. It was one of the most widely used books on Catholic dogmatics in the 19th century.

His complete theological lectures were published in French and ran through several editions; portions were translated into Spanish, Polish, German, Dutch, and other languages. His numerous dogmatic works are characteristic of the Roman theology of the time. They include Praelectiones theologicae, quas in Collegio Romano S.J. habebat Joannes Perrone (9 vols., Rome, 1835 sqq.), Praelectiones hierologicae in compendium redactae (4 vols., Rome, 1845), Il Hermesianismo (Rome, 1838), Il Protestantismo e la regola di fede (3 vols., 1853), and De divinitate D. N. Jesu Christi (3 vols., Turin, 1870).
