= Carlo Passaglia =

Italian Jesuit priest (1812–1887)

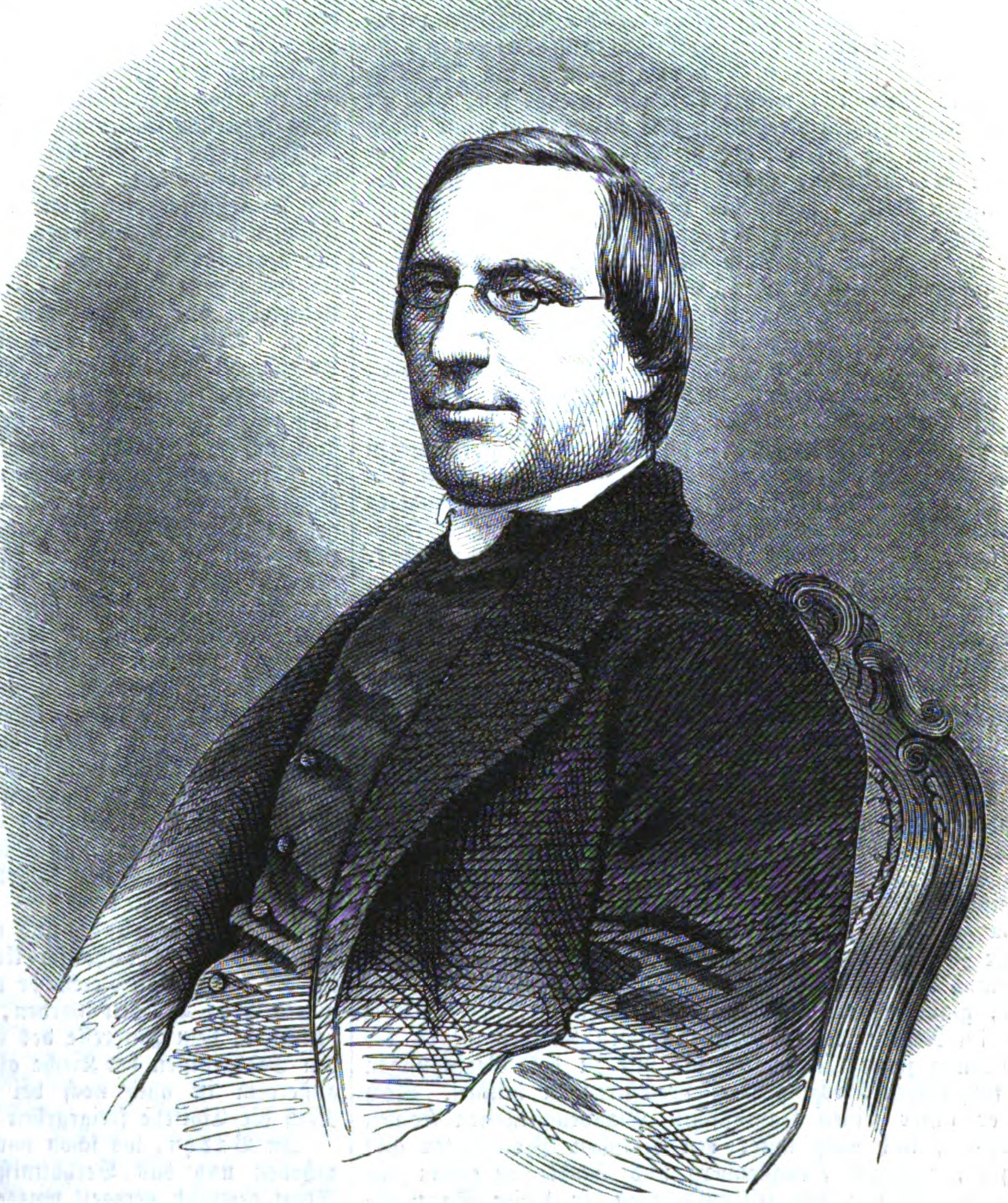
- Born: 2 May 1812; Lucca, Principality of Lucca and Piombino
- Died: 12 March 1887; Turin, Kingdom of Italy
- Occupations: Theologian, presbyter, university teacher, politician
- Employers: Pontifical Gregorian University; Sapienza University of Rome

Carlo Passaglia (2 May 1812 – 12 March 1887) was an Italian Jesuit and theologian.

== Life ==
Carlo Passaglia was born at Lucca on 2 May 1812.

Passaglia was soon destined for the priesthood, and was placed under the care of the Jesuits at the age of fifteen. He became successively doctor in mathematics, philosophy and theology in the university of Rome. In 1844 he was made professor in the Collegio Romano, the well known Jesuit college in Rome. In 1845 he took the vows as a member of the Jesuit order.

In 1848, during the expulsion of the Jesuits from Rome which followed on the revolutionary troubles in the Italian peninsula, he paid a brief visit to England. On his return to Italy he founded, with the assistance of Father Curci and Luigi Taparelli D'Azeglio, the celebrated organ of the Jesuit order entitled La Civiltà Cattolica. In 1854 came the decision of the Roman Church on the long-debated question of the Immaculate Conception of the Virgin. Into the agitation for the promulgation of this dogma Passaglia threw himself with great eagerness, and by so doing recommended himself strongly to Pope Pius IX. But his favor with the pope was of short duration.

In 1859, when the war between Austria and France (the first step towards the unification of Italy) broke out, Passaglia espoused the popular side. He took refuge at Turin, and under the influence of Cavour he wrote an Epistola ad Episcopos Catholics pro causa Italica, in which, like Liverani before him, he boldly attacked the temporal power of the pope. For this he was expelled from the order of Jesuits, his book was put on the Index, and his figure struck out, by the popes order, from a picture painted to commemorate the proclamation of the dogma of the Immaculate Conception.

A refuge from the anger of the pope was afforded him in the Casa Cavour at Turin, the house in which Cavour was born. There he labored for Italian unity with indomitable energy in the north of Italy, in conjunction with Cardinal d'Andrea in the south, and he collected the signatures of 9000 priests to an address to the pope in opposition to the temporal power, and in favor of abandoning all resistance to the union of Italy under a king of the House of Savoy. He and the 9000 priests were excommunicated on 6 October 1862.

Passaglia disregarded his excommunication, and continued his work as professor of moral philosophy at Turin, to which he had been appointed in 1861, and began a series of Advent addresses in the church of San Carlo at Milan. But on arriving in order to preach his second sermon he found himself met by an inhibition on the part of Mgr. Cacao, the administrator, of the archdiocese of Milan. Elected deputy in the Italian parliament, he still advocated strongly the cause of Italian independence, and at a later period wrote a defense of the rights of the episcopate under the title of La Causa di sua eminenza il cardinale d'Andrea. He also (1864) wrote against Ernest Renan's Vie de Jesus. Eight days before his death he endeavored to be reconciled to the pope, and made a full retractation. He died at Turin on 12 March 1887.

== Works ==
His chief works are: an edition of the Enchiridion of St. Augustine, with copious notes (Naples, 1847); De prærogativis b. Petri (Rome, 1850); Conferences given at the Gesù and published in Civiltà Cattolica (1851); Commentariorum theologicorum partes 3 (1 vol. Rome, 1850–51); De ecclesia Christi (3 vols., Ratisbon, 1853 — incomplete); De æternitate poenarum (Ratisbon, 1854).
