= Roman College =

Former Jesuit school in Rome, Italy

Coordinates: 41°53′53.11″N 12°28′48.94″E

- Collegio Romano (Italian)
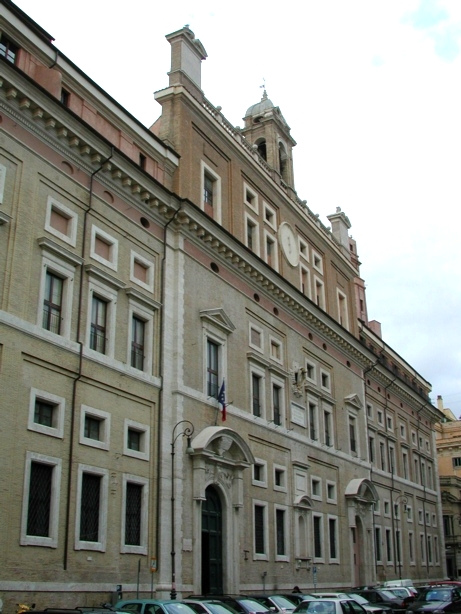
- The façade of the Roman College
- Interactive map of Roman College
- Type: Built as Jesuit (Roman Catholic) College
- Location: Piazza del Collegio Romano, Pigna District, Rome, Italy

History
- Established: 1551; 475 years ago
- Founder: Society of Jesus (Jesuits)
- Built: 1582–1584
- Built for: Home for Roman College
- Original use: Seminary and university

Site notes
- Architect: Bartolomeo Ammannati
- Current use: Public high school, Cultural Center, Parish church

The Roman College (Latin: Collegium Romanum; Italian: Collegio Romano) was a school established by St. Ignatius of Loyola in 1551, just 11 years after he founded the Society of Jesus (Jesuits). It quickly grew to include classes from elementary school through university level and moved to several successive locations to accommodate its burgeoning student population. With the patronage of Pope Gregory XIII, the final seat of the Roman College was built in 1584 near the center of Rome's most historic Pigna district, on what today is called Piazza del Collegio Romano, adding the church of St. Ignatius in 1626, and a renowned observatory in 1787. The college remained at this location for 286 years until the revolutionary Capture of Rome in 1870. (Note: In 1870, the new Italian government confiscated the property of the university and their building (that eventually became the Ennio Quirino Visconti Liceo Ginnasio), which forced the university to transfer to the Palazzo Gabrielli-Borromeo on the Via del Seminario.)

In 1873, the remaining philosophical and theological faculties of the Roman College moved to new quarters and formed the Gregorian University, named after the College's patron.

Though taken over by the Italian government, the original buildings on a full square block memorialize the early commitment of the Jesuits to education. Currently, its eastern wing houses the headquarters of the Ministry of Heritage and Culture (with entrance on Via del Collegio Romano) and the wing overlooking the square is home to the high school Ennio Quirino Visconti.

== Origins ==
The first university founded by the Jesuits was the College of Messina in 1548. Then in 1551, to make up for the shortage of public schools in Rome and to provide for better training of both religious and secular clergy during the Counter-Reformation period, the Roman College was founded, open only to men. The funding came from Francis Borgia, 4th Duke of Gandía. He had been a professed member of the Society of Jesus since 1548 but secretly; he retained his rank while attending to his obligations and settling his children. In 1551 the Collegio Romano was a small, rented building at the base of the Capitoline Hill, on today's Piazza d'Aracoeli. Jesuit Fr. Polanco wrote of teaching Latin and Greek and later Hebrew: "Christian doctrine is taught. Above the door of the school a sign says: a free school of grammar, humanism, and Christian doctrine." Jesuits were the first pupils: Edmond Auger (French), Emmanuel Gomez (Portuguese), John Egnazi (Florence), and Emerio de Bonis (Mantua). Within its first year the building could not accommodate the influx of students and Ignatius sought a larger facility. Without leaving the center of Rome, in September 1551 he rented a building on Via del Gesù behind the ancient church of Santo Stefano del Cacco. This second home of the Roman College was called the House of Frangipani after the famous family which owned it. The building was later demolished. This then was the second home of the Roman College.

== Roman College to Gregorian University ==
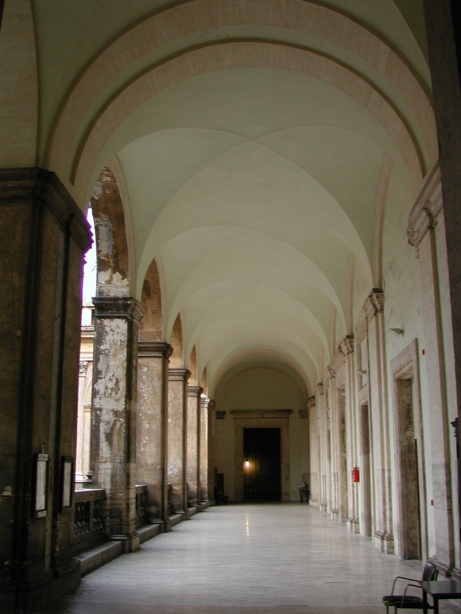
Roman College.

Despite the cost, Ignatius wanted to begin teaching philosophy and theology in the school year 1553–1554. This increased the student body, both of Jesuits and externs. In 1555, the financial conditions became such that the students had to be distributed among the various colleges of the Society in Italy.

On 17 January 1556 Pope Paul IV, seeing the great good that the Collegio Romano was for the young, gave it the privilege of conferring degrees in philosophy and theology with all the privileges of other universities. At this time also Ignatius founded the print shop which over the years introduced new typefaces, becoming the model in the business. Due to flood damage in that part of the House of Frangipani, and because of the growing number of students, the Roman College in 1558 moved to the house of Giovan Battista Salviati, that connected to the back of the church of Santa Maria in Via Lata, on the east side of today's Piazza del Collegio Romano. Jesuit theologian Francisco de Toledo was a professor at the college at this time.

Four years later, the Roman College became too small for the growing number of students and larger premises were sought. The building was demolished when Salviati built the new Roman College, since he wanted to enlarge the square for the Roman College. In 1560, Vittoria della Tolfa, Marchesa della Valle, a relative of Paul IV, donated an entire city block and its existing buildings to the Society of Jesus in memory of her late husband the Marchese della Guardia Camillo.

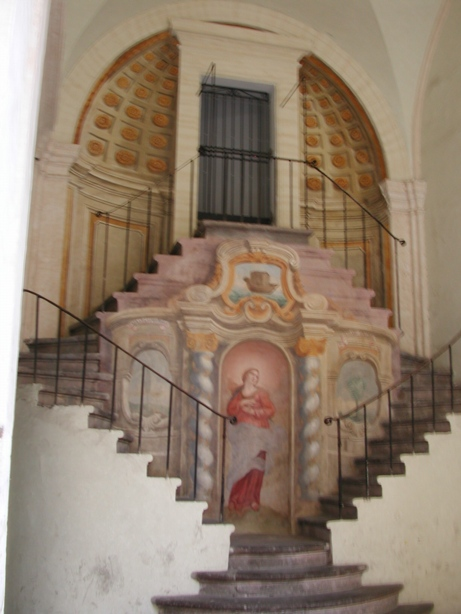
A fresco in the Roman College.

This remained the site of the Roman College until the takeover of its buildings by the Italian government in 1870. Ignatius of Loyola had died on 31 July 1556 and was succeeded by Fr. James P. Laynez, an original companion of Ignatius and a papal theologian during the three periods of the Council of Trent.

The Jesuits used the existing block of buildings, awaiting a benefactor to build a college building for their burgeoning student population on their more than ample land. That benefactor came in the person of Pope Gregory XIII who took a liking to the nascent institution and in 1574 assigned larger annuities. Then in 1581 with funding from the Pope and his relatives, on 11 January 1582 his nephew Cardinal Filippo Boncompagni laid the foundation stone for the new college building, designed by Florentine architect Bartolomeo Ammannati. Classes began on 28 October 1584. A picture on display at the Roman College shows Pope Gregory XIII present at the inauguration. Later on, in memory of its benefactor, the Roman College took the name of Gregorian University.

== College church ==
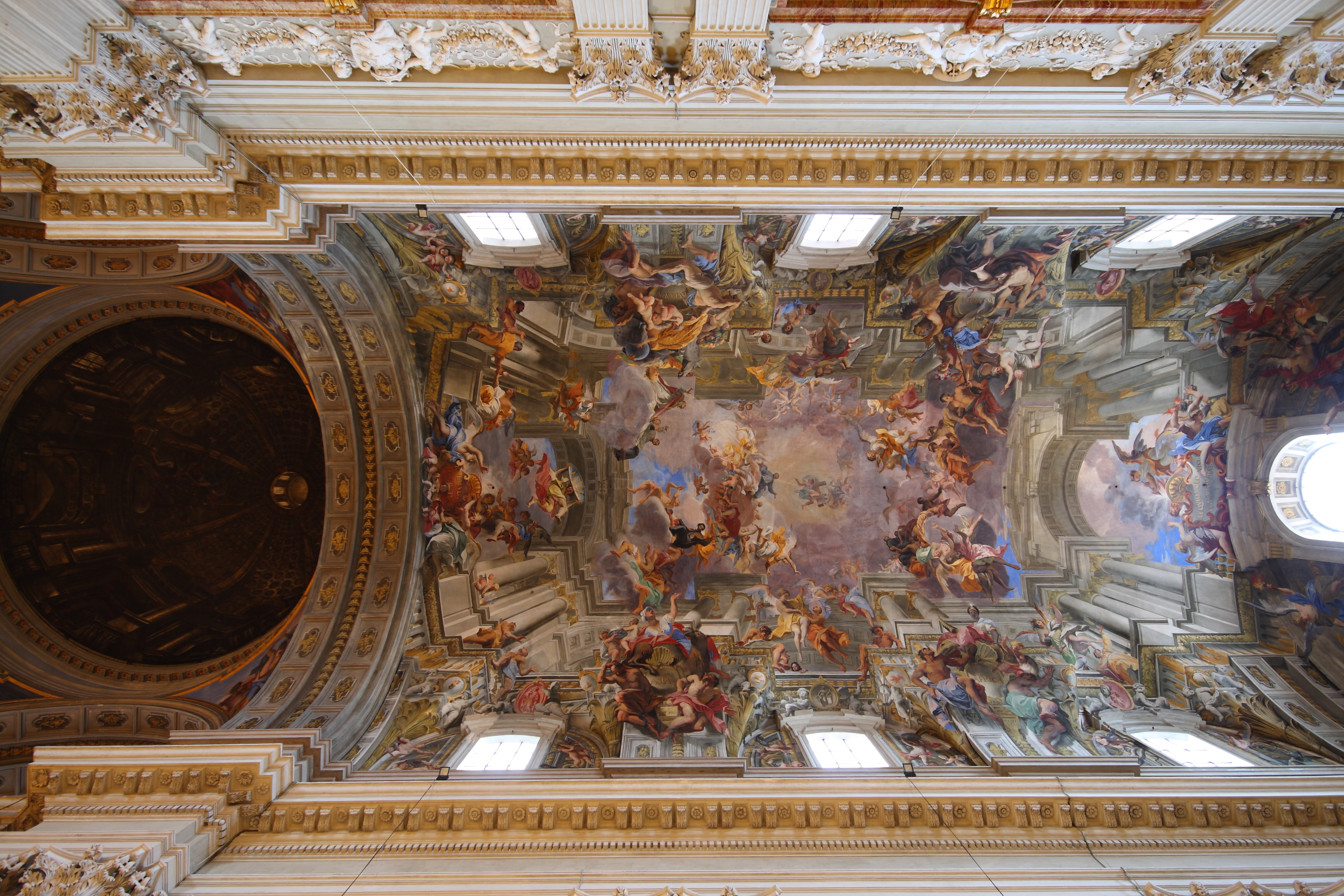
The ceiling fresco of Sant'Ignazio Church.

For a chapel, the Annunziata begun by the Poor Clares was completed by the Jesuits. It was built in 1562 and decorated in 1571 with a fresco by Federico Zuccari in the apse. Saints Stanislaus Kostka, Robert Bellarmine, Aloysius Gonzaga, and John Berchmans worshipped here. But by 1620 this proved too small for a student population that exceeded 2000. After the canonization of St. Ignatius of Loyola in 1622, Cardinal Ludovico Ludovisi, nephew of Pope Gregory XV, financed the construction of much larger church named for the new saint. The old church and a part of a classroom wing of the Roman College were removed to make room for the church of St. Ignatius. It was designed by the Jesuit Orazio Grassi and solemnly consecrated in 1722. The flat ceiling and missing dome were frescoed by painter Jesuit Brother Andrea Pozzo, in a style that creates the illusion of depth (photo on right).

== Later developments ==
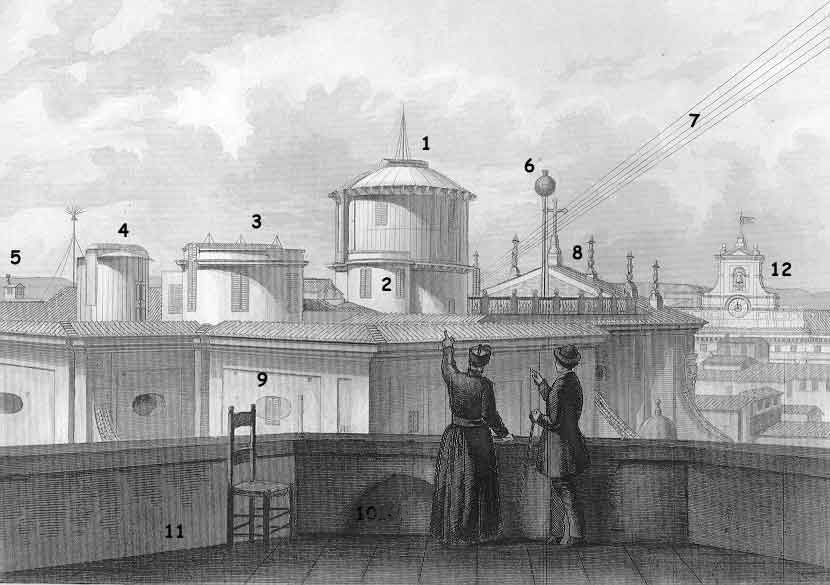
Observatory of the Roman College. 1 - Main Observatory of equatorial Merz telescope. 2 - Main staircase to the Observatory. 3 - Observatory for the Ertel meridian circle. 4 - Observatory for the telescope of Cauchoix. 5 - Observatory electric tower with small lead ball. 6 - Antenna with globe dropped at midday as signal to fire the cannon at Castel Sant'Angelo (now on the Janiculum). 7 - Electric cables transmit signals from meteorological sensors on Calandrelli Tower to meteorograf recorder housed in room below main observatory. 8 - Rear of St. Ignatius facade. 9 - Back of Church of St. Ignatius. 11 - Tower Terrace. 12 - Roof of Palazzo Montecitorio, now the Chamber of Deputies.

The Roman College became the center of academia in its time. It hosted many learned debates including those between Galileo Galilei and Orazio Grassi, professor of mathematics there. The German Jesuit scholar Athanasius Kircher, "Master of a Hundred Arts", was a professor at the college and left on the premises a museum filled with his works.

The Jesuits were particularly drawn to astronomy and had a large observatory tower and scientific laboratories constructed on the roof of the annexed church, in 1787. The building of the college consists of two large, colonnaded courtyards and large classrooms. The Library of the Roman College, the most notable of Rome, was removed in 1873 and merged into the Biblioteca Nazionale Vittorio Emanuele II.

In 1773, with the suppression of the Society of Jesus, the Jesuits entrusted the college to the secular clergy. It was seriously damaged during the French occupation of Rome. After the restoration of the Jesuits, Pope Leo XII on 17 May 1824, with the brief Cum Fine, ordered the restitution of the Roman College with the outbuildings and church of St. Ignatius to the Society of Jesus. Leo himself was present for the inauguration of the new academic year on 2 November 1824. Fr. Giovanni Perrone was among the distinguished faculty of theology of that time. With the reopening of the Roman College the famous astronomical observatory was restored and enlarged.

The Jesuits experienced a setback during the Roman Republic, when on 29 March 1848 they were expelled and their building became a Roman seminary. The following year the building was occupied and heavily damaged by the revolutionaries who burned a wing of the college. On 7 August 1849 the French arrived to liberate Rome. On 3 March 1850 the Roman seminary was returned and classes resumed. Twenty years later on 20 September 1870, with the occupation troops of Savoy in Rome, the college was used as a barracks for sharpshooters; classrooms were used for a technical school and high school.

On 6 November 1870 the college was closed and the symbol of the Society of Jesus was chiseled from the doors; until then both the Jacobins and Mazzini had spared it.

It remained open only as a school of philosophy and theology for the Roman clergy. On 17 January 1873 the libraries, astronomical observatory, scientific laboratory, and the Kircher Museum were taken over by the new government. With the extension of the rule of Savoy to the city of Rome, the Jesuits were finally removed. Pius IX protested against this usurpation with the encyclical Etsi fine luctuosa of 21 November 1873. The community of Jesuit professors found hospitality at the Palazzo Borromeo-Gabrielli as guests of the German College (moved elsewhere in 1886), now home to students of the Jesuit Bellarmine College. In this new site the school of philosophy and theology, with the official title of the Pontifical Gregorian University of the Roman College, resumed, fostered and protected by Pope Leo XIII.

The Roman College would live on only through its philosophy and theology faculties, which had departed the premises in 1870. For the later history of these faculties see the article on the Gregorian University, which includes a list of notable students & professors from throughout the long history of the college/university.

== See also ==
- List of Jesuit sites
