= List of biblical commentaries =

Literary work which comments on Bible texts

This is an outline of commentaries and commentators. Discussed are the salient points of Jewish, patristic, medieval, and modern commentaries on the Bible. The article includes discussion of the Targums, Mishna, and Talmuds, which are not regarded as Bible commentaries in the modern sense of the word, but which provide the foundation for later commentary. With the exception of these classical Jewish works, this article focuses on Christian Biblical commentaries; for more on Jewish Biblical commentaries, see Jewish commentaries on the Bible.

== Jewish commentaries ==
=== Philo ===
Philo tried to reconcile the Jewish Scriptures with Greek philosophy, and for this purpose he made extensive use of the allegorical method of interpretation. He taught that many passages of the Pentateuch were not intended to be taken literally. In fact, he said that they were literally false, but allegorically true.

He did not make the distinction between natural and revealed religion. For example, Pagan systems may have natural religion highly developed, but, from a Judeo-Christian point of view, with much concomitant error. His exegesis served to tide over the difficulty for the time amongst the Hellenistic Jews, and had great influence on Origen of Alexandria and other Alexandrian Christian writers.

=== Targums ===
Frederic Farrar, in his Life of Christ, says that it has been suggested that when Christ visited the Temple, at twelve years of age, there may have been present among the doctors Jonathan ben Uzziel, once thought to be the author of the Yonathan Targum, and the venerable teachers Hillel and Shammai, the handers-on of the Mishna. The Targums were the only approach to anything like a commentary on the Bible before the time of Christ. They were interpretative translations or paraphrases from Hebrew into Aramaic for the use of the synagogues when, after the Exile, the people had lost the knowledge of Hebrew. It is doubtful whether any of them were committed to writing before the Christian Era. They are important as indicating the character of the Hebrew text used.

Shlomo Yitzchaki (1040–1105), more commonly known as Rashi (RAbbi SHlomo Itzhaki), was a medieval French rabbi and author of a comprehensive commentary on the Talmud and commentary on the Tanakh.

=== Mishna and Talmuds ===
Hillel and Shammai were the last "pair" of several generations of "pairs" (Zugot) of teachers. These pairs were the successors of the early scribes who lived after the Exile. These teachers are said to have handed down and expanded the Oral Law, which, according to the uncritical view of many Jews, began with Moses. This Oral Law consists of legal and liturgical interpretations and applications of the Pentateuch. As no part of it was written down, it was preserved by constant repetition (Mishna). Upon the destruction of Jerusalem, several rabbis, learned in this Law, settled at Jamnia, near the sea, 28 miles (45 km) west of Jerusalem. Jamnia became the headquarters of Jewish learning until AD 135, due to the Third Jewish Revolt. Then schools were opened at Sepphoris and Tiberias to the west of the Sea of Galilee. The rabbis comforted their countrymen by teaching that the study of the Law (Oral as well as Written) took the place of the sacrifices. They devoted their energies to arranging the Unwritten Torah, or Law. One of the most successful at this was Rabbi Akiba who took part in the Third Jewish Revolt of Bar Kochba against the Romans, and lost his life (135). The work of systematization was completed and probably committed to writing by the Jewish patriarch at Tiberias, Rabbi Jehudah ha-Nasi "The Prince" (150–210). He was of noble birth, wealthy, learned, and is called by the Jews "Our Master the Saint" or simply Rabbi par excellence. This compilation, called the Mishna, is written in Mishnaic Hebrew and consists of six great divisions or orders, each division containing, on an average, about ten tractates, each tractate being made up of several chapters. The Mishna may be said to be a compilation of Jewish traditional moral theology, liturgy, law, etc. There were other traditions not embodied in the work of Rabbi, and these are called additional Mishna.

The discussions of later generations of rabbis all centred round the text of the Mishna. Interpreters or "speakers" laboured upon it both in Jerusalem and Babylonia (until 500), and the results are comprised in the Jerusalem and Babylonian Talmuds. The word Talmud means teaching, doctrine. Each Talmud consists of two parts, the Mishna (in Hebrew), in sixty-three tractates, and an explanation of the same (Gemara), ten or twelve times as long. The explanatory portion of the Jerusalem Talmud is written in NeoWestern Aramaic and that of the Babylonian Talmud in Eastern Aramaic, which is closely allied to Syriac or Mandaic. The passages in the Gemara containing additional Mishna are, however, given in New Hebrew. Only thirty-nine tractates of the Mishna have Gemara. The Talmud, then, consists of the Mishna (traditions from 450 BC till 200 AD), together with a commentary thereon, Gemara, the latter being composed about 200-500 AD. Next to the Bible the Babylonian Talmud is the great religious book of orthodox Jews, though the Palestinian Talmud is more highly prized by modern scholars. From the year 500 till the Middle Ages the rabbis (geonim) in Babylonia and elsewhere were engaged in commenting on the Talmud and reconciling it with the Bible. A list of such commentaries is given in The Jewish Encyclopedia.

=== Midrashim ===
Simultaneously with the Mishna and Talmud there grew up a number of Midrashim, or commentaries on the Bible. Some of these were legalistic, like the halakhic sections of the Talmud, but the most important were of an edifying, homiletic character (Midrash Aggadah). These latter, although chronologically later, are important for the corroborative light which they throw on the language of the New Testament. The Gospel of John is seen to be steeped in early Jewish phraseology, and the words of Psalm 109 LXX Hebrew Bible 110], "The Lord said to my Lord", etc. are in one place applied to the Messiah, as they are in Gospel of Matthew 22:44 (referenced from Psalm 110:1), though Rashi, following the rabbis, interpreted the words in the sense of applying them to Abraham.

=== Karaite commentators ===
Anan ben David, a prominent Babylonian Jew in the eighth century, rejected Rabbinism for the written Old Testament and became the founder of the sect known a Karaites (a word indicating their preference for the written Bible). This schism produced great energy and ability on both sides. The principal Karaite Bible commentators were Nahavendi (ninth century); Abu al-Faraj Harun (ninth century), exegete and Hebrew grammarian; Solomon ben Yerucham (tenth century); Sahal ben Mazliach (died 950), Hebrew grammarian and lexicographer; Joseph al-Bazir (died 930); Japhet ben Ali, the greatest Karaite commentator of the tenth century; and Judah Hadassi (died 1160).

=== Middle Ages ===
Saadiah of Fayûm (died 942), the most powerful writer against the Karaites, translated the Bible into Arabic and added notes. Besides commentaries on the Bible, Saadiah wrote a systematic treatise bringing revealed religion into harmony with Greek philosophy. He thus became the forerunner of Maimonides and the Catholic Schoolmen.

Solomon ben Isaac, called Rashi (born 1040), wrote very popular explanations of the Talmud and the Bible.

Tobiah ben Eliezer, a Romaniote scholar and paytan in 11th century Kastoria (Greece), wrote the Leḳaḥ Ṭov or Pesiḳta Zuṭarta, a midrashic commentary on the Pentateuch and the Five Megillot.

Abraham Ibn Ezra of Toledo (died 1168) had a good knowledge of Semitic languages and wrote learned commentaries on the Old Testament. He was the first to maintain that Isaiah contains the work of two prophets.

Moses Maimonides (died 1204), the greatest Jewish scholar of the Middle Ages, of whom his coreligionists said that "from Moses to Moses there was none like Moses", wrote his "Guide to the Perplexed", which was read by St. Thomas. He was a great admirer of Aristotle, who was to him the representative of natural knowledge as the Bible was of the supernatural.

There were the two Kimchis, especially David (died 1235) of Narbonne, who was a celebrated grammarian, lexicographer, and commentator inclined to the literal sense. He was followed by Nachmanides of Catalonia (died 1270), a doctor of medicine who wrote commentaries of a cabbalistic tendency; Immanuel of Rome (born 1270); and the Karaites Aaron ben Joseph (1294), and Aaron ben Elias (fourteenth century).

=== Modern ===
Isaac Abarbanel (born Lisbon, 1437; died Venice, 1508) was a statesman and scholar. None of his predecessors came so near the modern ideal of a commentator as he did. He prefixed general introductions to each book, and was the first Jew to make extensive use of Christian commentaries. Elias Levita (died 1549) and Azarias de Rossi (died 1577) have also to be mentioned.

Moses Mendelssohn of Berlin (died 1786), a friend of Lessing, translated the Pentateuch into German. His commentaries (in Hebrew) are close, learned, critical, and acute. He had much influence, and was followed by Wessely, Jarosław, Homberg, Euchel, Friedlander, Hertz, Herxheimer, Ludwig Philippson, etc., called "Biurists", or expositors. The modern liberal school among the Jews is represented by Salomon Munk, Samuel David Luzzato, Leopold Zunz, Geiger, Julius Fürst, etc.

Rabbi Pesach Wolicki (born 1970) is a biblical scholar and commentator. His book, Cup of Salvation, also known as Cup of Salvation: A Powerful Journey Through King David's Psalms of Praise, which was published by the Center for Jewish–Christian Understanding and Cooperation (CJCUC) in 2017, is a devotional biblical commentary on Psalms 113-118 otherwise known as the Hallel.

== Patristic commentaries ==
The history of Christian exegesis may be roughly divided into three periods: the Age of the Fathers, the Age of Catenæ and Scholia (seventh to sixteenth century), and the Age of Modern Commentaries (sixteenth to twentieth century). The earliest known commentary on Christian scriptures was by a Gnostic named Heracleon in the 170s CE. Most of the patristic commentaries are in the form of homilies, or discourses to the faithful, and range over the whole of Scripture. There are two schools of interpretation, that of Alexandria and that of Antioch.

=== Alexandrian School ===
The chief writers of the Alexandrian School were:

- Pantænus
- Clement of Alexandria
- Origen of Alexandria
- Dionysius of Alexandria
- Didymus the Blind
- Cyril of Alexandria
- St. Pierius.

To these may be added

- St. Ambrose, who, in a moderate degree, adopted their system

Its chief characteristic was the allegorical method. The 1913 Catholic Encyclopedia considers it to be founded on passages in the Gospels and the Epistles of St. Paul, but heavily influenced by the writings of Alexandrian Jews, especially of Philo.

The great representative of this school was Origen (died 254). Origen was the son of Leonides of Alexandria, himself a saint and martyr. Origen became the master of many great saints and scholars, one of the most celebrated being St. Gregory Thaumaturgus; he was known as the "Adamantine" on account of his incessant application to study, writing, lecturing, and works of piety. He frequently kept seven amanuenses actively employed; it was said he became the author of 6000 works (Epiphanius, Hær., lxiv, 63); according to St. Jerome, who reduced the number to 2000 (Contra. Rufin., ii, 22), he left more writings than any man could read in a lifetime (Ep. xxxiii, ad Paulam). Besides his great labours on the Hexapla he wrote scholia, homilies, and commentaries on the Old and the New Testament. In his scholia he gave short explanations of difficult passages after the manner of his contemporaries, the annotators of the Greek classics. Most of the scholia, in which he chiefly sought the literal sense, are unfortunately lost, but it is supposed that their substance is embodied in the writings of St. John Chrysostom and other Fathers. In his other works Origen pushed the allegorical interpretation to the utmost extreme. In spite of this, however, his writings were of great value, and with the exception of St. Augustine, no writer of ancient times had such influence.

=== Antiochene School ===
The writers of the Antiochene School disliked the allegorical method, and sought almost exclusively the literal, primary, or historical sense of Holy Scripture. The principal writers of this school were

- St. Lucian
- Eusebius of Nicomedia
- Maris of Chalcedon
- Eudoxius
- Theognis of Nicaea
- Asterius
- Arius the heresiarch
- Diodorus of Antioch, Bishop of Tarsus, and his three great pupils
  - Theodore of Mopsuestia
  - Theodore's brother Polychronius
  - St. John Chrysostom

The great representatives of this school were Diodorus, Theodore of Mopsuestia, and St. John Chrysostom. Diodorus, who died Bishop of Tarsus (394), followed the literal to the exclusion of the mystical or allegorical sense. Theodore was born at Antioch, in 347, became Bishop of Mopsuestia, and died in the communion of the Church, 429. He was a powerful thinker, but an obscure and prolix writer. He felt intense dislike for the mystical sense, and explained the Scriptures in an extremely literal and almost rationalistic manner.

His pupil, Nestorius, became the subject of the Nestorian controversy; the Nestorians translated his books into Syriac and regarded Theodore as their great "Doctor". This made Catholics suspicious of his writings, which were finally condemned after the famous controversy on The Three Chapters. Theodore's commentary on St. John's Gospel, in Syriac, was published, with a Latin translation, by a Catholic scholar, Dr. Chabot.

St. John Chrysostom, priest of Antioch, became Patriarch of Constantinople in 398. He left homilies on most of the books of the Old and the New Testament. When St. Thomas Aquinas was asked by one of his brethren whether he would not like to be the owner of Paris, so that he could dispose of it to the King of France and with the proceeds promote the good works of his order, he answered that he would prefer to be the possessor of Chrysostom's Super Matthæum. St. Isidore of Pelusium said of him that if the Apostle St. Paul could have used Attic speech he would have explained his own Epistles in the identical words of St. John Chrysostom.

=== Intermediate School ===
Other writers combined both these systems, some leaning more to the allegorical and some to the literal sense. The principal contributors were

- Isidore of Pelusium
- Theodoret
- St. Basil
- St. Gregory of Nazianzus
- St. Gregory of Nyssa
- St. Hilary of Poitiers
- Ambrosiaster
- St. Jerome
- St. Augustine
- St. Gregory the Great
- Pelagius

Jerome, besides his translations of Scripture and other works, left many commentaries, in some of which he departed from the literal meaning of the text. At times he did not always indicate when he was quoting from different authors, which according to Richard Simon accounts for his apparent discrepancies.

== Medieval commentaries ==
The medieval writers were content to draw from the rich treasures left them by their predecessors. Their commentaries consisted, for the most part, of passages from the Church Fathers, which they connected together as in a chain, a catena.

=== Greek Catenists ===
- Procopius of Gaza (sixth century), one of the first to write a catena
- St. Maximus, Martyr (seventh century)
- St. John Damascene (eighth century)
- Olympiodorus (tenth century)
- Ecumenius (tenth century)
- Nicetas of Constantinople (eleventh century)
- Blessed Theophylactus, Archbishop in Bulgaria (eleventh century)
- Euthymius Zigabenus (twelfth century)
- writers of anonymous catenæ edited by John Antony Cramer and Cardinal Mai

=== Latin Catenists, Scholiasts, etc. ===
The principal Latin commentators of this period were the Venerable Bede, Walafrid Strabo, Anselm of Laon, Hugh of Saint-Cher, St. Thomas Aquinas, and Nicholas de Lyra.

The Venerable Bede (seventh to eighth century), a good Greek and Hebrew scholar, wrote a useful commentary on most of the books of the Old and the New Testament. It is in reality a catena of passages from Greek and Latin Fathers judiciously selected and digested.

Walafrid Strabo (ninth century), a Benedictine, was credited with the "Glossa Ordinaria" on the entire Bible. It is a brief explanation of the literal and mystical sense, based on Rabanus Maurus and other Latin writers, and was one of the most popular works during the Middle Ages, being as well known as "The Sentences" of Peter Lombard.

Anselm of Laon, professor at Paris (twelfth century), wrote the Glossa Interlinearis, so called because the explanation was inserted between the lines of the Vulgate.

Hugh of Saint-Cher (Hugo de Sancto Caro), thirteenth century), besides his pioneer Biblical concordance, composed a short commentary on the whole of the Scriptures, explaining the literal, allegorical, analogical, and moral sense of the text. His work was called Postillæ, i. e. post illa (verba textus), because the explanation followed the words of the text.

Thomas Aquinas (thirteenth century) left commentaries on Job, Psalms, Isaiah, Epistles of St. Paul, and was the author of the well-known Catena Aurea on the Gospels. This consists of quotations from over eighty Church Fathers. He throws much light on the literal sense and is most happy in illustrating difficult points by parallel passages from other parts of the Bible.

Nicholas de Lyra (thirteenth century), joined the Franciscans in 1291 and brought to the service of the Church knowledge of Hebrew and rabbinical learning. He wrote short notes or Postillæ on the entire Bible, and set forth the literal meaning with great ability, especially of the books written in Hebrew. This work was most popular, and in frequent use during the late Middle Ages, and Martin Luther was indebted to it.

A great impulse was given to exegetical studies by the Council of Vienne which decreed, in 1311, that chairs of Hebrew, Chaldean, and Arabic should be established at Paris, Oxford, Bologna, and Salamanca.

Besides the major writers already mentioned the following are some of the principal exegetes, many of them Benedictines, from patristic times till the Council of Trent:

- Cassiodorus (sixth century)
- Saint Isidore of Seville (seventh century)
- Julian of Toledo (seventh century)
- Alcuin (eighth century)
- Rabanus Maurus (ninth century)
- Druthmar (ninth century)
- Remigius of Auxerre (ninth century)
- Bruno of Würzburg, a distinguished Greek and Hebrew scholar
- St. Bruno, founder of the Carthusians (eleventh)
- Gilbert of Poitiers
- Andrew of Saint Victor (twelfth century)
- Rupert of Deutz (twelfth century)
- Alexander of Hales (thirteenth century)
- Albertus Magnus (thirteenth century)
- Paul of Burgos (fourteenth to fifteenth)
- Alphonsus Tostatus of Avila (fifteenth century)
- Ludolph of Saxony; and Dionysius the Carthusian, who wrote a commentary on the whole of the Bible
- Jacobus Faber Stapulensis (fifteenth to sixteenth centuries)
- Gagnaeus (fifteenth to sixteenth centuries)
- Erasmus and Cardinal Cajetan (sixteenth century)

=== Syriac commentators ===
- Ishodad of Merv (fl. 850)
- Jacob Bar-Salibi (12th century)
- Gregory Bar Hebraeus (13th century)

== Modern Catholic commentaries ==
The influx of Greek scholars into Italy after the fall of Constantinople, the Christian and anti-Christian Renaissance, the invention of printing, the controversial excitement caused by the rise of Protestantism, and the publication of polyglot Bibles by Cardinal Ximenes and others, gave renewed interest in the study of the Bible among Catholic scholars. Controversy showed them the necessity of devoting more attention to the literal meaning of the text, according to the wise principle laid down by St. Thomas in the beginning of his "Summa Theologica".

It was then that the Jesuits, founded in 1534, stepped into the front rank to counter the attacks on the Catholic Church. The Ratio Studiorum of the Jesuits made it incumbent on their professors of Scripture to acquire a mastery of Greek, Hebrew, and other Semitic languages. Alfonso Salmeron, one of the first companions of Ignatius Loyola, and the pope's theologian at the Council of Trent, was a distinguished Hebrew scholar and voluminous commentator. Bellarmine, one of the first Christians to write a Hebrew grammar, composed a valuable commentary on the Psalms, giving an exposition of the Hebrew, Septuagint, and Vulgate texts. It was published as part of Cornelius a Lapide's commentary on the whole Bible. Cornelius a Lapide, S. J. (born 1566), was a native of the Low Countries, and was well versed in Greek and Hebrew. During forty years he devoted himself to teaching and to the composition of his great work, which has been highly praised by Protestants as well as Catholics.

Juan Maldonato, a Spanish Jesuit, born 1584, wrote commentaries on Isaias, Baruch, Ezechiel, Daniel, Psalms, Proverbs, Canticles (Song of Solomon), and Ecclesiastes. His most well known work is his Latin commentary on the Four Gospels, which is acknowledged by many as one of the best ever written.

Similar to the work of Maldonato, there is also the commentary on the Epistles by Estius (born at Gorcum, Holland, 1542), a secular priest, and superior of the college at Douai.

Many other Jesuits were the authors of valuable exegetical works, e.g.:

- Francis Ribera of Castile (born 1514)
- Cardinal Toletus of Cordova (born 1532)
- Manuel de Sá (died 1596)
- Bonfrère of Dinant (born 1573)
- Mariana of Talavera (born 1537)
- Alcazar of Seville (born 1554)
- Barradius "the Apostle of Portugal"
- Sánchez of Alcalá (died 1628)
- Nicholas Serarius of Lorraine (died 1609)
- Lorinus of Avignon (born 1559)
- Tirinus of Antwerp (born 1580)
- Menochius of Pavia
- Pereira of Valencia (died 1610)
- Pineda of Seville

The Jesuits were rivalled by

- Arias Montanus (died 1598), the editor of the Antwerp Polyglot Bible
- Sixtus of Siena, O. P. (died 1569)
- Johann Wild (Ferus), O. S. F.
- Dominic Soto, O. P. (died 1560)
- Andreas Masius (died 1573)
- Jansen of Ghent (died 1576)
- Génébrard of Cluny (died 1597)
- Antonio Agelli (died 1608)
- Luke of Bruges (died 1619)
- Calasius, O. S. F. (died 1620)
- Malvenda, O. P. (died 1628)
- Jansen of Ypres
- Simeon de Muis (died 1644)
- Jean Morin, Oratorian (died 1659)
- Isaac Le Maistre (de Sacy)
- John Sylveira, Carmelite (died 1687)
- Bossuet (died 1704)
- Richard Simon, Oratorian (died 1712)
- Calmet, Benedictine, who wrote a valuable dictionary of the Bible, of which there is an English translation, and a highly esteemed commentary on all the books of Scripture (died 1757)
- Louis de Carrières, Oratorian (died 1717)
- Piconio, Capuchin (died 1709)
- Bernard Lamy, Oratorian (died 1715)
- Pierre Guarin, O. S. B. (died 1729)
- Houbigant, Oratorian (died 1783)
- William Smits, Recollect (1770)
- Jacques Le Long, Oratorian (died 1721)
- Dominikus von Brentano (died 1797)

=== Nineteenth century ===
During the nineteenth century the following were a few of the Catholic writers on the Bible:

- John Martin Augustine Scholz
- Johann Leonhard Hug
- Johann Jahn
- Arthur-Marie Le Hir
- Joseph Franz Allioli
- Mayer
- van Essen
- Jean-Baptiste Glaire
- Daniel Bonifacius von Haneberg
- Guillaume-René Meignan
- Franz Xaver Reithmayr
- Francis Xavier Patrizi
- Valentin Loch
- August Bisping (his commentary on the New Testament styled "excellent" by Fulcran Vigouroux)
- Joseph Corluy
- Louis Claude Fillion
- Henri Lesêtre
- Trochon (Introductions and Comm. on Old and New Test., "La Sainte Bible", 27 vols.)
- Peter Schegg
- Louis Bacuez
- Francis Kenrick
- John McEvilly
- Arnauld
- Paul Schanz
- Constant Fouard
- Anthony John Maas
- Fulcran Vigouroux (works of Introduction)
- Ward
- McIntyre

Catholics have also published scientific books. There is the great Latin "Cursus" on the whole of the Bible by the Jesuit Fathers, Karl Cornely, Joseph Knabenbauer, and Franz Hummelauer. The writings of Marie-Joseph Lagrange (Les Juges), Albert Condamin (Isaïe), Theodore Calmes (Saint Jean), Albin van Hoonacker (Les Douze Petits Prophètes).

For a list of Catholic publications on the Scripture, the reader may be referred to the "Revue biblique", edited by Lagrange (Jerusalem and Paris), and the "Biblische Zeitschrift', published by Herder (Freiburg im Breisgau). For further information concerning the principal Catholic commentators see respective articles.

=== Twentieth century ===
- Haydock's Catholic Bible Commentary, 1859 edition. by George Leo Haydock, following the Douay-Rheims Bible.
- A Catholic Commentary on Holy Scripture 1953 edited by Bernard Orchard, Edmund F. Sutcliffe, Reginald C. Fuller, Ralph Russell, foreword by Cardinal Bernard Griffin, Archbishop of Westminster
- A New Catholic Commentary on Holy Scripture (1969) Thomas Nelson Publishers
- Collegeville Bible Commentary (1989) edited by Dianne Bergant, C.S.A., Robert J. Karris, O.F.M. Liturgical Press
- Jerome Biblical Commentary (1968) edited by Raymond Edward Brown, SS, Joseph A. Fitzmyer, SJ, and Roland E. Murphy (primarily Catholic authors)
- New Jerome Biblical Commentary (1990) edited by Raymond Edward Brown, SS, Joseph A. Fitzmyer, SJ, and Roland E. Murphy (primarily Catholic authors)
- The International Bible Commentary (1998) edited by William R. Farmer Liturgical Press

=== Twenty-first century ===
- The Navarre Bible (2004), commentary to the Revised Standard Version Catholic Edition text by the faculty of the University of Navarra.
- Sacra Pagina (2008), edited by Daniel J. Harrington, SJ.
- New Collegeville Bible Commentary (2015), edited by Daniel Durken, OSB.
- Ignatius Catholic Study Bible Series (2017), edited by Scott Hahn and Curtis Mitch.
- The Paulist Biblical Commentary (2018) edited by Joel Enrique Aguilar Chiu, Richard J. Clifford, SJ, Carol J. Dempsey, OP, Eileen M. Schuller, OSU, Thomas D. Stegman, SJ, Ronald D. Witherup, PSS.
- Catholic Commentary on Sacred Scripture (2019), edited by Peter S. Williamson and Mary Healey of the Pontifical Gregorian University.
- The Jerome Biblical Commentary for the Twenty-First Century (2022) edited by John J. Collins, Gina Hens-Piazza, Barbara Reid, OP, and Donald Senior, CP.

== Modern Orthodox commentaries ==
- The Explanatory Bible of Aleksandr Lopukhin and successors (1904-1913) is written by professors of Russian theological seminaries and academies. It's based on Russian Synodal Translation, its authors apply to ancient sources of the text (Masoretic Text, Septuagint, etc.). At the present time, is the only full Russian Orthodox Bible commentary on both canonical and deuterocanonical books of the Scripture. The Lopukhin Bible was republished in 1987 by Biblical Societies of Northern Europe countries.
- The Orthodox Study Bible is an English-language translation and annotation of the Septuagint with references to the Masoretic Text in its Old Testament part and its New Testament part it represents the NKJV, which uses the Textus Receptus, representing 94% of Greek manuscripts. It offers commentary and other material to show the Eastern Orthodox Christian understanding of Scripture often in opposite to catholic and Protestant ideas. Additionally the OSB provides basic daily prayers, a lectionary for personal use, and reproductions of icons in its pages.

== Protestant commentaries ==
=== In general ===
The commentaries of the first Reformers, Luther, Melanchthon, Calvin, Zwingli and their followers wrote on Holy Scripture during the 16th, 17th, and 18th centuries.

- Anglicans: Lightfoot
- Arminians: Grotius, van Limborch, le Clerc
- Calvinists: Calvin, Drusius, de Dieu, Cappel, Samuel Bochart, Cocceius, Vitringa, John Gill
- Lutherans: Luther, Gerhard, Geier, Calov (Calov Bible), S. Schmid, Michaelis, Lange, Melanchthon
- Socinians: Crell, Schlichting
- English writers: Matthew Poole, Annotations (1700), 2 volumes Folio (Genesis-Isaiah 58 written by Poole; Isaiah 59–Revelations by friends), the basis of subsequent reprints); Matthew Henry, An Exposition of the Old and New Testaments(1708-1710), 5 volumes, Folio (modern editions derive from early 19th century editions); Mayer; Samuel Clark, The Old and New Testaments, with Annotations and Parallel Scriptures (1690) and Survey of the Bible; or, An Analytical Account of the Holy Scriptures... (1693); William Lowth, Commentary on the Prophets (1714-1725); William Dodd, Commentary on the Books of the Old and New Testaments (1770), 3 volumes Folio; John Wesley, Explanatory Notes Upon the New Testament (ca. 1791), 2 volumes; [The so-called "Reformers' Bible":] The Holy Bible, containing the Old and New Testaments, according to the Authorized Version, with short Notes by several learned and pious Reformers, as printed by Royal Authority at the time of the Reformation, with additional Notes and Dissertations, London, 1810.

During the nineteenth century:

- Joseph Priestley (1803)
- George Burder (1809)
- George D'Oyly and Richard Mant (1820)
- Adam Clarke, 8 vols., (1810-1826)
- Joseph Benson, 5 vols., (1811-1818)
- Benjamin Boothroyd (1823, Hebrew scholar)
- Thomas Scott (1822, popular)
- Bloomfield (Greek Test., with Eng. notes, 1832)
- Kuinoel (Philological Comm. on New Test., 1828)
- Hermann Olshausen (1839)
- Haevernick (1845)
- Michael Baumgarten (1859)
- Friedrich Tholuck (1843)
- Richard Chenevix Trench (Parables, Sermon on the Mount, Miracles, N. T. Syn.)
- The Speakers Commentary, edited by Frederic Charles Cook
- Henry Alford (Greek Testament, with critical and exegetical commentary, 1856)
- Franz Delitzsch (1870), Ebrard Hengstenberg (1869)
- Christopher Wordsworth (The Greek Testament, with notes, 1877)
- Johann Friedrich Karl Keil
- Charles Ellicott (Epistles of St. Paul,)
- W. J. Conybeare and J. S. Howson (St. Paul)
- Johann Peter Lange, together with Schroeder, Fay, Cassel, Bacher, Zoeckler, Moll, etc. (Old and N. Test., 1864–78)
- Thomas Lewin (St. Paul, 1878)
- H. C. G. Moule (Epistles of St. Paul)
- Beet
- Gloag; Perowne
- Joseph Barber Lightfoot (Epistles of St. Paul)
- Brooke Foss Westcott

There were many commentaries published at Cambridge, Oxford, London, etc. (see publishers' catalogues, and notices in "Expositor", "Expository Times", and "Journal of Theological Studies"). Other notable writers include:

- Frederic W. Farrar
- Andrew B. Davidson
- Andrew R. Fausset
- Alfred A. Plummer
- Robert Plumptre
- Alexander Maclaren Expositions of Holy Scripture (32 vols., 1904-1910)
- George Salmon
- Henry Barclay Swete
- F. F. Bruce
- Marcus Dods (theologian born 1834)
- Dean Stanley
- S. R. Driver
- William T. Kirkpatrick
- William Sanday
- A. T. Robinson
- Philip Schaff
- Charles Augustus Briggs
- Ezra Palmer Gould
- Cyrus Scofield

There are also the Bible dictionaries of Kitto, Smith, and Hastings. Many of these works, especially the later ones, are valuable for their scientific method, though not of equal value for their views or conclusions.

Prominent series include:

- Cambridge Bible for Schools and Colleges (56 vols., 1878-1918).
- Concordia Commentary series
- Expositor's Bible Commentary (EBC)
- Expositor's Bible Commentary (revised) (REBC)
- International Critical Commentary (ICC)
- Interpretation: A Bible Commentary for Teaching and Preaching
- New Century Bible Commentaries, now out of print
- New International Commentary on the Old Testament (NICOT)
- New International Commentary on the New Testament (NICNT)
- New International Greek Testament Commentary (NIGTC)
- Pillar New Testament Commentary (PNTC)
- Popular Commentary of the Bible (Paul E. Kretzmann) (4 Vols. 1921–1924)
- Tyndale Old Testament Commentaries (TOTC)
- Tyndale New Testament Commentaries (TNTC)

One-volume Commentaries:

- Jamieson-Fausset-Brown Bible Commentary (1871)
- A Commentary on the Holy Bible, edited by J. R. Dummelow (1909)
- Peake's Commentary on the Bible, edited by Arthur Samuel Peake (1919). Revised edition, edited by Matthew Black and H. H. Rowley (1962)
- The Interpreter's One-Volume Commentary on the Bible (1971)
- Harper's Bible Commentary, edited by James L. Mays (1988)
- The Oxford Bible Commentary, edited by John Barton and John Muddiman (2001)

A notable recent specialist commentary is Commentary on the New Testament Use of the Old Testament (2007), edited by G. K. Beale and D. A. Carson.

=== Rationalistic commentaries ===
The opinions of the English rationalists were disseminated on the Continent by Voltaire and others. In Germany the ground was prepared by the philosophy of Wolff and the writings of his disciple Semler. The posthumous writings of Reimarus were published by Lessing between 1774 and 1778 (The Fragments of Wolfenbüttel). Lessing pretended that the author was unknown. According to the "Fragments", Moses, Christ, and the Apostles were impostors. Lessing was vigorously attacked, especially by Goeze. Eichhorn, in his "Introduction to the Old Testament" (Leipzig 1780–83, 3 vols.), maintained that the Scriptures were genuine productions, but that, as the Jews saw the intervention of God in the most ordinary natural occurrences, the miracles should be explained naturally.

Heinrich Paulus (1761–1850), following the lead of Eichhorn, applied to the Gospels the naturalistic method of explaining miracles. G. L Bauer, Heyne (died 1812), and Creuzer denied the authenticity of the greater portion of the Pentateuch and compared it to the mythology of the Greeks and Romans. The greatest advocate of such views was de Wette (1780–1849), a pupil of Paulus. In his "Introduction to the Old Testament" (1806) he maintained that the miraculous narratives of the Old Testament were popular legends, which in the course of centuries, became transformed and transfused with the marvellous and the supernatural, and were finally committed to writing in perfectly good faith.

David Strauss (1808–74) applied this mythical explanation to the Gospels. He showed most clearly, that if with Paulus the Gospels are allowed to be authentic, the attempt to explain the miracles naturally breaks down completely. Strauss rejected the authenticity and regarded the miraculous accounts in the Gospels as naive legends, the productions of the pious imaginations of the early generations of Christians.

The views of Strauss were severely criticized by the Catholics, Kuhn, Mack, Hug, and Sepp, and by the Protestants Neander, Tholuck, Ullman, Lange, Ewald, Riggenbach, Weiss, and Keim.

The German Protestant scholar F. C. Baur originated a theory which was for a time in great vogue, but which was afterwards abandoned by the majority of critics. He held that the New Testament contains the writings of two antagonistic parties amongst the Apostles and early Christians. His principal followers were Zeller, Schwegler, Planck, Köslin, Ritsch, Hilgenfeld, Volkmar, Tobler, Keim, Hosten, some of whom, however, emancipated themselves from their master.

Besides the writers already mentioned, the following wrote in a rationalistic spirit:

- Ernesti (died 1781)
- Berthold (1822)
- the Rosenmüllers
- Crusius (1843)
- Bertheau
- Hupfeld
- Ewald
- Thenius
- Fritzsche
- Justi
- Gesenius (died 1842)
- Longerke
- Bleek
- Bunsen (1860)
- Umbreit
- Kleinert
- Knobel
- Nicolas
- Hirzel
- Kuenen
- J. C. K. von Hoffmann
- Hitzig (died 1875)
- Schulz (1869)
- B. Weiss
- Ernest Renan
- Tuch
- Heinrich A. W. Meyer (and his continuators Huther, Luneman, Dusterdieck, Brückner, etc.),
- Julius Wellhausen
- Wieseler
- Jülicher
- Beyschlag
- H. Holtzmann, and his collaborators
- Schmiedel, von Soden

Holtzmann, while practically admitting the authenticity of the Gospels, especially of St. Mark, explains away the miracles. He believes that miracles do not happen, and that the scripture are merely echoes of Old Testament miracle stories. Holtzmann was severely taken to task by several writers in the "International Critical Commentary". The activity of so many acute minds has thrown great light on the language and literature of the Bible.

== Modern non aligned commentaries ==
- Anchor Yale Bible
- International Critical Commentary

== See also ==
- Biblical hermeneutics
- Biblical studies
- Exegesis
- Hermeneutics
- Jewish commentaries on the Bible

== External public domain Bible commentaries ==
With the rise of the Internet, many Public Domain or otherwise free-use Bible commentaries have become available online. Here is a list of some of the commentaries:

- The Grace Commentary by Dr. Paul Ellis
- Notes on the New Testament by Albert Barnes
- Commentaries by John Calvin
- Commentaries by Adam Clarke
- Exposition of the Bible by John Gill
- Synopsis of the Bible by John Darby
- Complete Commentary by Matthew Henry
- The Popular Commentary of the Bible by Paul E. Kretzmann
- Commentary Critical and Explanatory on the Whole Bible by Robert Jamieson, A.R. Fausset, and David Brown
- Commentary by William Kelly
- Commentary on Galatians, at CCEL, by Luther
- Robertson's Word Pictures of the New Testament
- Explanatory Notes by John Wesley
- Bible Commentary Forever
- EasyEnglish Bible Commentaries by MissionAssist

Many public domain commentaries are now available to view or download through the Google Books Project and the Internet Archive. FreeCommentaries.com is curating a list of free commentaries from these and other sources. The Christian Classics Ethereal Library has presented a unified reference tool to access many commentaries from different traditions in their World Wide Study Bible.

With all the commentaries now available, several resources review and recommend commentaries, including Tyndale Seminary's Old Testament Reading Room and New Testament Reading Room, Challies, Best Commentaries, and Lingonier Ministries.
