= Francesco Antonio Zaccaria =

Italian theologian, historian and writer

Reverend Francesco Antonio Zaccaria
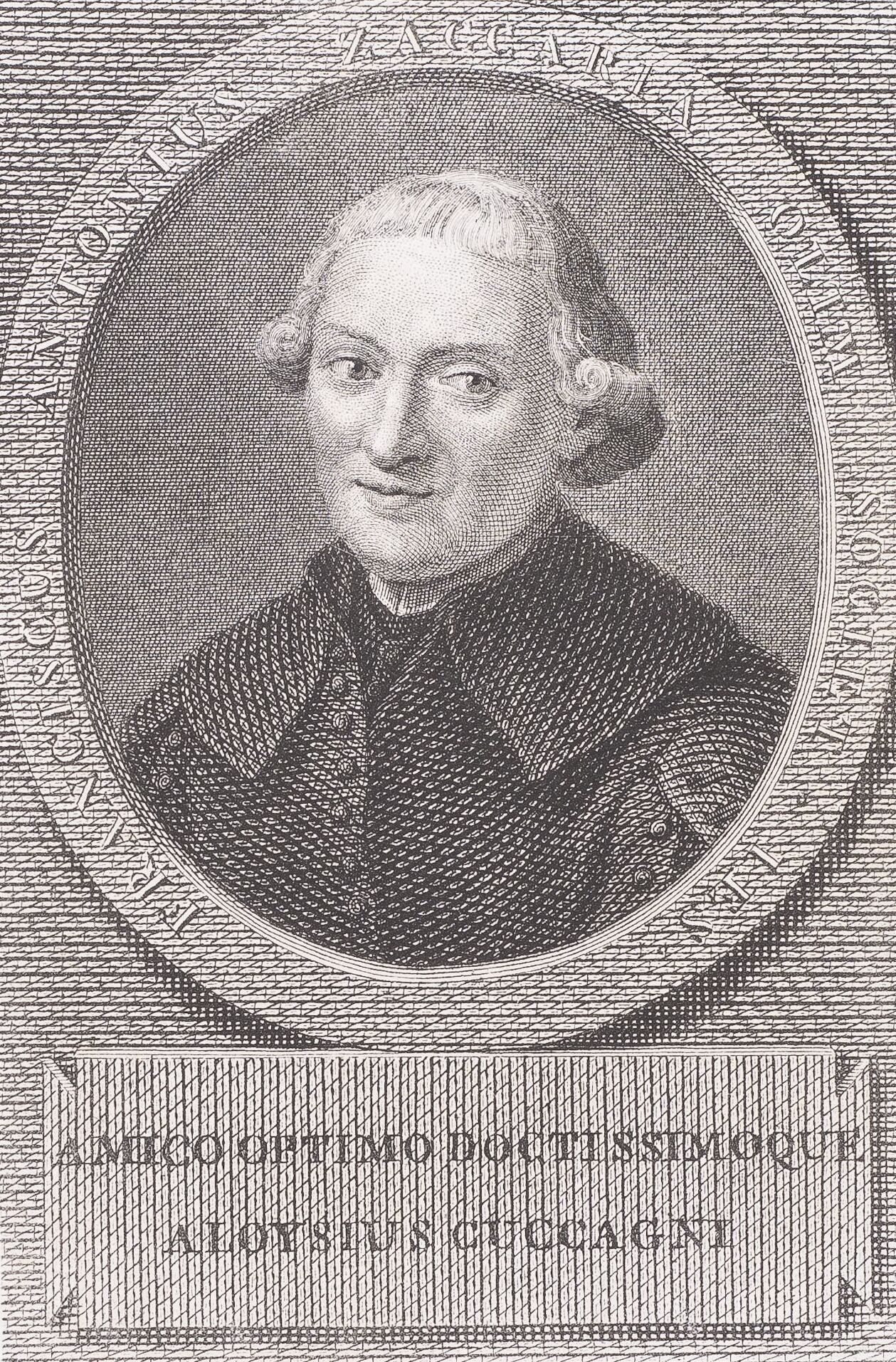
- Born: March 27, 1714; Venice, Republic of Venice
- Died: 10 October 1795 (aged 81); Rome, Papal States
- Resting place: Sant'Apollinare, Rome
- Other name: Claristo-Sycionio
- Occupations: Jesuit priest, historian, librarian, philologist, journalist
- Parent(s): Tancredi Zaccaria and Teresa Zaccaria (née Ferretti)

Academic background
- Influences: Bollandists; Lodovico Antonio Muratori

Academic work
- Discipline: Historian
- Sub-discipline: Medievalist
- Institutions: Biblioteca Estense; Sapienza University of Rome
- Influenced: Girolamo Tiraboschi

Francesco Antonio Zaccaria S.J. (March 27, 1714 – October 10, 1795) was an Italian theologian, historian, and prolific writer.

== Biography ==
Francesco Antonio Zaccaria was born in Venice. His father, Tancredi, was a noted jurist. He joined the Austrian province of the Society of Jesus on 18 October 1731. Zaccaria taught grammar, the humanities, and rhetoric in the College of Gorizia, and was ordained priest at Rome in 1740. He spent some time in pastoral work in Ancona, Fermo, and Pistoia, gaining renown as a preacher and controversial lecturer. In 1751, he succeeded Muratori as ducal archivist and librarian of Modena, but was removed in 1768, owing to his Antifebronio, in which he strenuously defended the rights of the Holy See.

He was then appointed librarian at the Jesuit professed house in Rome. Clement XIII allowed him an annual pension, continued under Clement XIV, and increased by Pius VI, who appointed him professor of church history at the Sapienza and director of the Pontifical Ecclesiastical Academy. He was a member of at least 19 Italian academies. He died in Rome, aged 81.

== Works ==
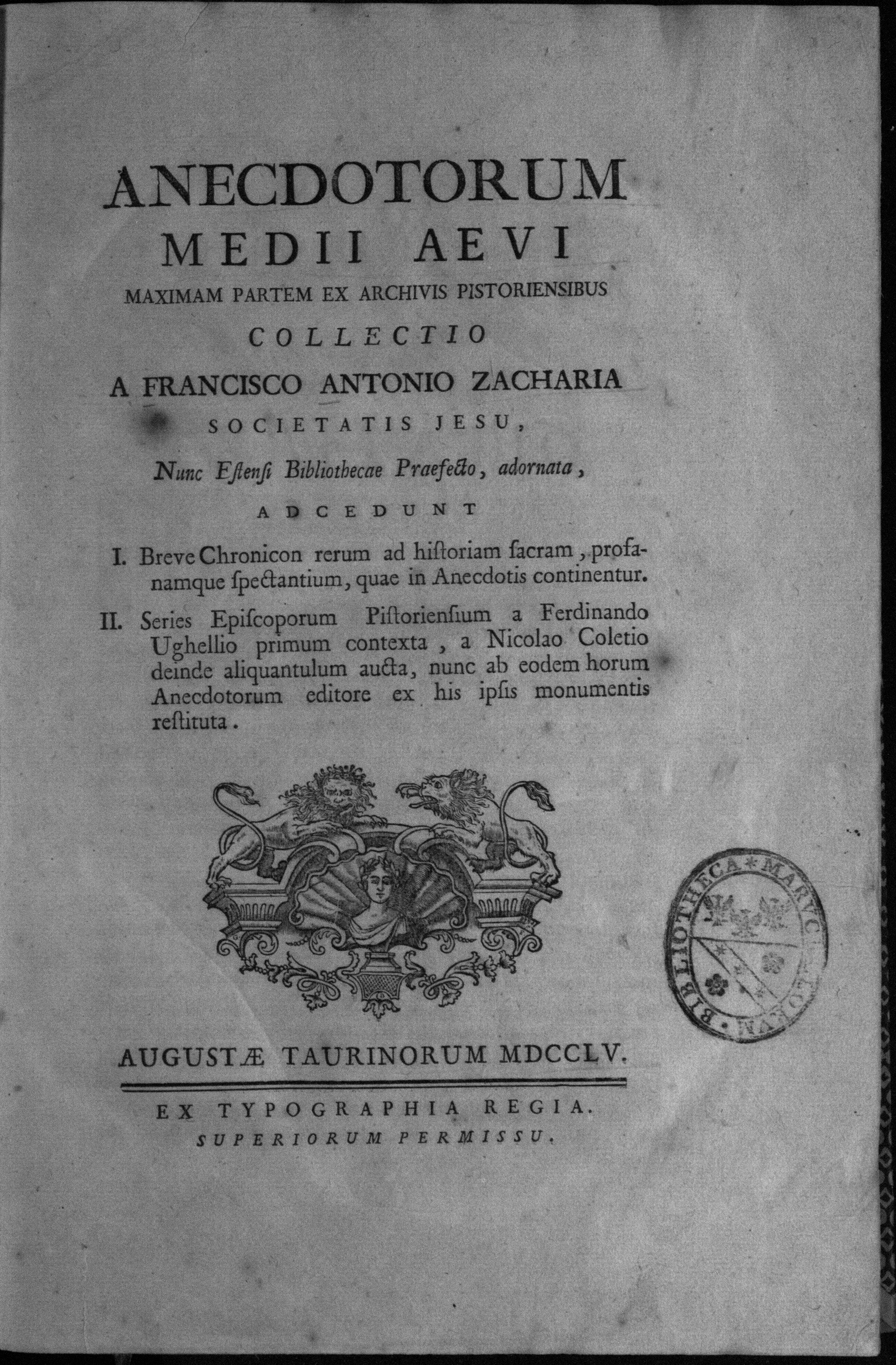
Anecdotorum Medii Aevi

Of the 161 printed works ascribed to him by Sommervogel the following are the most important.

=== Church history ===
- Series episcoporum Cremonensium (Milan, 1749)
- Laudensium (ibid., 1763)
- Auximatium (Osimo, 1764)
- Vico Aequensium (Rome, 1778)
- Caesenatium (Cesena, 1779)
- Forocorneliensium (Imola, 1820)
- De' santi martiri Fedele, Capoforo, Gratiniano, e Felino (Milan, 1750)
- Acta SS. Bollandiana apologeticis libris in unum volumen nunc primum contractis vindicata (Antwerp, 1755)
- De rebus ad historiam atque antigitates ecclesiae pertinentibus (Foligno, 1781)
- Raccolta di dissertazioni di storia ecclesiastica (22 vols., Rome, 1792-7).
- Istoria del Concilio di Trento (Faenza, 1797-7)

=== Theology and canon law ===
- Thesaurus theologicus (13 vols., Venice, 1762) - a compilation of theological treatises by various authors, arranged so as to form an orderly exposition of the different topics of theology
- De casuisticae theologicae originibus, locis atque praestantia, written at the instance of St. Alphonsus Liguori and prefixed to the third edition of the latter's Moral Theology
- Apparatus omnigenae eruditionis ad theologiam et jus canonicum (Rome, 1773)

=== Polemics ===
- Antifebronio (Pesaro, 1767), Latin edition (Cesena, 1771-2 and in Migne, Theol. Cursus Completus, XXVII, 463-1300)
- Storia polemica del celibato sacro (Rome, 1774), German translation by Pius John (1783)
- Storia polemica delle proibizione de' libri (Rome, 1777)
- Difesa di tre Sommi Pontefici Benedetto XIII, Benedetto XIV, e Clemente XIII, e del Concilio Romano tenuto nel 1775 (Ravenna, 1784)
- Comandi chi può, ubbidisca chi dee (Faenza, 1788)

=== Liturgy ===
- Dell'anno santo (Rome, 1774)
- Bibliotheca ritualis (2 vols., Rome, 1776-8)
- Nuovo effemerologio universale (Rome, 1780)
- Onomasticon rituale selectum (Faenza, 1787)

=== Archaeology ===
- istituzione antiquario-lapidaria (Rome, 1770)
- Istituzione antiquario-numismatica (Rome, 1772)

=== Literary history ===
- Storia Letteraria d'Italia (14 vols., Modena, 1750–57) - a literary review edited by Zaccaria with the assistance of Leonardo Ximenes, Domenico Troili, and Gioacchino Gabardi
- Excursus litterarii per Italiam (Venice, 1754)
- Iter Litterarium per Italiam (Venice, 1762)
- Saggio critico della corrente letteratura straniera (3 vols., Modena, 1576), written by Zaccaria, with Gabardi and Troili
- Annali letterarii d'Italia (3 vols., Modena, 1762-3)
- Biblioteca antica e moderna di storia letteraria (3 vols., Pesaro, 1766-8)

=== Annotated editions ===
- Joannes Stephanus Menochius (the jesuit Giovanni Stefano Menochio), Commentarius totius s. Scripturae (Venice, 1743)
- Dante, La Divina Comedia (Verona, 1749)
- Tamburini, Theologia Moralis (Venice, 1755)
- Busenbaum and Lacroix, Theologia Moralis (1755)
- Domenico Viva, Opuscula omnia theologico-moralia (Ferrara, 1757)
- Louis Abelly, Medulla theologica (Venice, 1757)
- Petavius, Opus de theologicis dogmatibus (Venice, 1757)
- Vitus Pichler, Jus Canonicum (Pesaro, 1758)
- Jacobus Tirinus (Jacques Tirin), In universam Scripturam Commentarius (Venice, 1759)
- Bartolomeo Gavanto, Opera theologico-canonica (Ferrara, 1760)
- Honoré Tournély, Praelectiones (Venice, 1765)
- Alexander Natalis, Historia Ecclesiastica (Venice, 1776-7)
- Lucius Ferraris, Bibliotheca canonicojuridica (Rome, 1748–90)
- Francesco Sforza Pallavicino, Istoria del Concilio di Trento (Faenza, 1792-7)
