= Louis de Carrières =

French priest and Bible commentator

Louis de Carrières (1 September 1662 in Angers, France – 11 June 1717 in Paris) was a French priest and Bible commentator.

== Life ==
Carrières was born in the château de la Plesse in Avrille, near Angers. He entered the French Oratory at a time when such masters as Le Cointe, Louis Thomassin, Nicolas Malebranche, Richard Simon and Bernard Lamy were flourishing, and made the Bible the preferred subject of his studies. He founded a scholarship in Biblical studies, the first beneficiary of which was Charles Houbigant. Carrières held various offices in his community, and earned the reputation as a priest both modest and learned.

== Works ==
His work La Sainte Bible en francais, avec un commentaire littéral inséré dans la traduction won a place among the readers of the scriptures in French. It differs markedly from anything published by earlier commentators. Taking Louis-Isaac Lemaistre de Sacy's translation as a framework, Carrières added a few words of paraphrase here and there to explain difficulties or clear up obscure places. These simple and short additions inspired for the most part by Vatable, Tirinus, Menochius, Bonfrere and Cornelius Jansen, and printed in italics, are easily discernible from the text itself, with which they are also united so as to form one continuous narrative. There are thus no notes to interrupt the text. There are a few errors, however — occasional mistranslations, some groundless hypotheses and opinions later discredited, some unfortunate choices of authorities and interpretations.

The first volumes published at Paris and Reims in the beginning of the eighteenth century were heartily welcomed and highly recommended by Jacques-Bénigne Bossuet, who encouraged the writer to pursue his work. The commentary, forming twenty-four volumes, duodecimo, was completed in 1716. New editions rapidly followed: the second edition with preface, summaries, and dissertations compiled by the Abbé de Vence, twenty-two volumes, duodecimo (Nancy, 1738–1741); third edition, five volumes, octavo (Paris, 1740); fourth edition, ten volumes, octavo (1747); fifth edition, with maps and illustrations, six volumes, quarto (1750), etc. Carrières' paraphrase, slightly corrected, together with an abridged revision of Calmet's commentaries and a few dissertations from the Abbé de Vence, made up Rondet's Bible d'Avignon (1748-1750), widely known later as the Bible de Vence. During the nineteenth century Carrières's version was frequently reprinted, often with the commentaries of Menochius, sometimes also with the notes of nineteenth-century interpreters, like Sionnet (1840) and Claude-Joseph Drioux (1884).
