= Jean de La Haye =

French Franciscan preacher and Biblical scholar

Jean de La Haye (Paris, 20 March 1593 – Paris, 15 October 1661) was a French Franciscan preacher and Biblical scholar.

== Life ==
He passed his boyhood in Spain and received the Franciscan habit in the province of St. Gabriel, of the Alcantarine Reform. He taught philosophy and theology, and distinguished himself as pulpit orator.

Being called to France in 1620, he was assigned important offices both in the order and at the Court of Louis XIII.

== Works ==
De la Haye is the author or editor of some forty folio volumes, besides several unpublished manuscripts. He edited the works of Bernardine of Siena, and the writings of Francis of Assisi and Anthony of Padua, but his project of bringing out all important works by Franciscan authors in a Bibliotheca Ordinis Minorum was not realized.

Designed principally for the use of preachers were his commentaries:

- "In Genesim, sive Arbor vitae concionatorum", 4 vols.;
- "In Exodum, vel Concionatorum virga, percutiens peccatores", 3 vols.;
- "In Apocalypsim", 3 vols.

Two major works were the "Biblia Magna", 5 vols. (Paris, 1643) and the "Biblia Maxima", 19 vols. (Paris 1660). The text of the Vulgate forms the basis of the two. In the former the author quotes verbatim, after every chapter, the commentaries of Gagnaeus, Estius, Manuel de Sá, Menochius, and Tirinus, S.J.; whereas in the latter he appends to each extract

1. the various readings of the versions,
2. a paragraph in which the harmony of these readings and the literal meaning of the text are briefly discussed, and
3. annotations drawn from the commentators above cited, but headed, in this case, by Nicolaus Lyranus.

The methods followed by the author have been praised; yet it has been observed that the prolegomena and his own interpretations of the text are lacking in judgment.
