= Astruc =

Astruc is a Jewish surname and given name, from the Occitan word astruc, meaning "lucky".

Notable people with the name include:

- Astruc family
- Abba Mari (13th century), French rabbi who took the name Astruc
- Astruc de Noves (14th century), French philosopher and physicist
- Astruc Remoch (14th century), Spanish medieval doctor
- Astruc ha-Levi (14th century), Spanish medieval scholar
- Alexandre Astruc (1923–2016), French film critic and director
- Cyril Astruc (born 1973), French-Israeli businessman
- Didier Astruc, French chemist
- Gabriel Astruc (1864–1938), French theatrical impresario
- Jean Astruc (1684–1766), French medical professor
- Miriam Astruc (1904–1963), French archaeologist
- Mordecai Astruc (fl. late 17th century), Jewish liturgical poet
- Zacharie Astruc (1835–1907), French sculptor, painter and author
