= Barradas =

Barradas is a surname of Portuguese and Spanish language. Notable people with the surname include:

- Carmen Barradas (1888–1963), Uruguayan pianist, composer, and choral teacher
- Gregorio Barradas Miravete (1982–2010), Mexican politician for the National Action Party
- Huáscar Barradas (born 1964), Venezuelan flautist and professor
- Isidro Barradas, Spanish general sent to Mexico in 1829 to try to reconquer the country for the Spanish Crown
- João Barradas, Portuguese accordionist and composer
- Rafael Barradas (1890–1929), Uruguayan painter and artist
- Sebastião Barradas, Portuguese exegete and preacher
- Jacques Barradas, South African born Chartered Accountant, Registered Auditor. A listed company mining specialist

== See also ==
- Barradas III, a Star Trek planet
- Estadio Manoel Barradas, a multi-purpose stadium in Salvador, Brazil
- Barrada, another surname
