= Bedan (disambiguation) =

Bedan is a Biblical figure; and it may also refer to:

- Type of woodturning chisel with a special wedge-like section used for cutting beads and for hollowing boxes and for use with the sizing tool
- Arabic curse word sometimes used to express anger
- Nickname of students from the San Beda College in Manila, Philippines
- Bedan, Afghanistan, a place in Afghanistan
