= John de Pineda =

Spanish theologian (1558–1637)

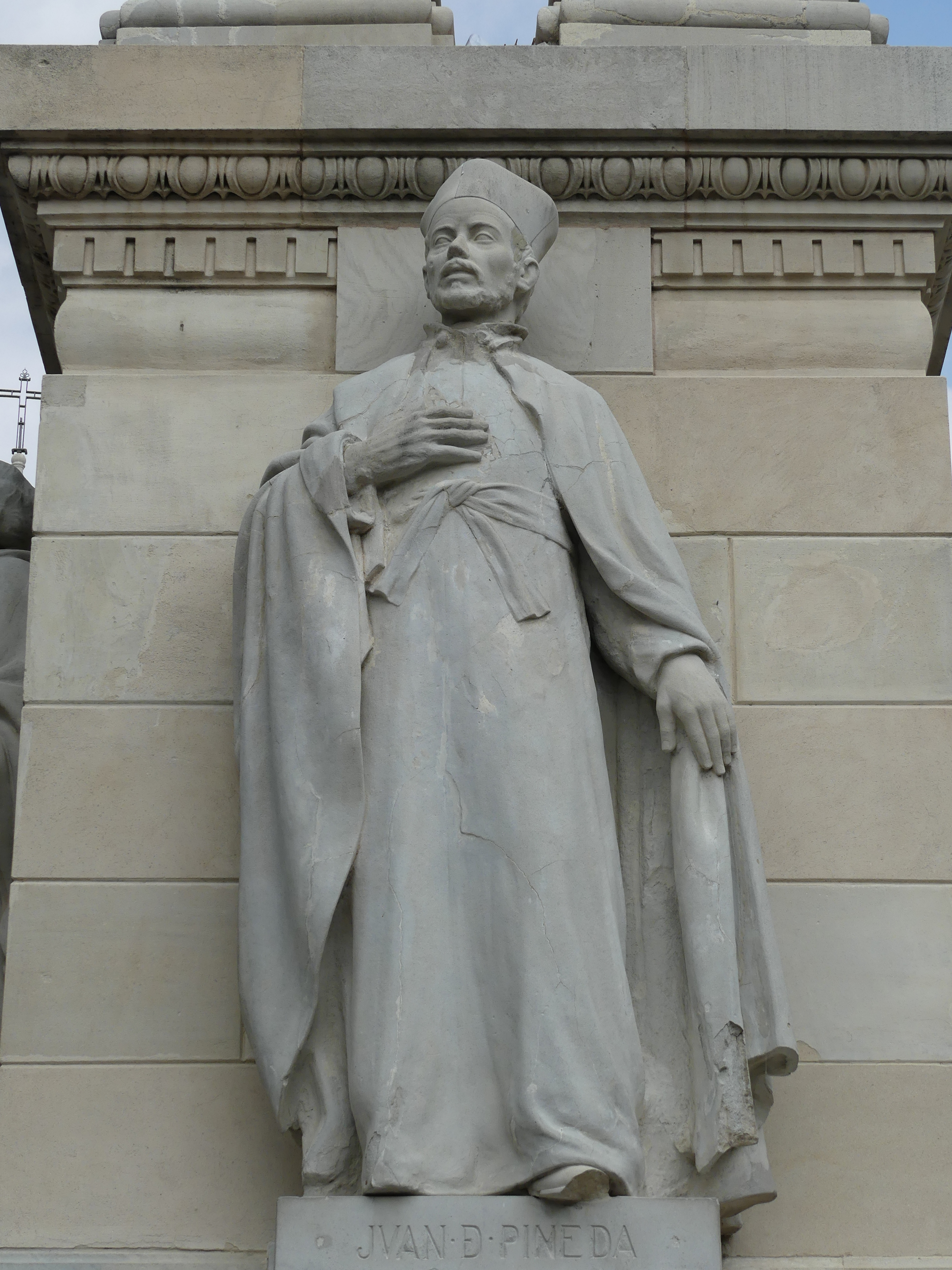
Statue of Juan de Pineda in Seville, Andalusia, Spain.

John de Pineda S.J. (Spanish: Juan de Pineda; 1558 – 27 January 1637) was a Spanish Jesuit theologian and exegete. He was a consultor to the Spanish Inquisition and nineteen printed works and six manuscripts of his writing are in existence.

== Life ==
Pineda was born in Seville. He entered the Society of Jesus in 1572, taught philosophy and theology five years in Seville and Cordova, and specialized in Scripture, which he taught for eighteen years in Cordova, Seville, and Madrid. He held the posts of Provost of the professed house and rector of the college of Seville.

He was consultor to the Spanish Inquisition, and, in this capacity, visited the chief libraries of Spain. The results of his visits was the Index Prohibitorum Librorum (1612), which won the appreciation of the Inquisition and of the chief inquisitor, Cardinal Sandoval, Archbishop of Toledo; it was re-edited (1632) for Cardinal Zapata.

The fame he won by his erudition and sanctity is attested in many ways. On a visit to the University of Evora, he was greeted by a Latin speech, and a memorial tablet was set up with the legend, Hic Pineda fuit.

He died in Seville.

== Works ==
His learning is evidenced by the nineteen printed works and six manuscripts, chiefly of exegetical subjects, which remain to us of his writings:

- Commentariorum in Job libri tredecim (Madrid, 1597–1601). Each chapter is paraphrased and fully commented upon. These two folios were often re-issued in Madrid, Cologne, Seville, Venice, and Paris. Seven indices served as guides to the student. Both Catholic and Protestant exegetes still praise this colossal storehouse of erudition. The archeology, textual criticism, comparison of various interpretations, use of historical data from profane writers, all show Pineda to have been far ahead of his time in scientific criticism of the Bible.
- Prælectio sacra in Cantico Canticorum (Seville, 1602), issued as a greeting to Cardinal de Guevara, archbishop of Seville, on the occasion of his visit to the Jesuit college there.
- Salomon prævius, sive de rebus Salomonis regis libri octo (fol, pp. 587; Lyons 1609; Mainz, 1613). The life, kingdom, wisdom, wealth, royal buildings, character, and death of Solomon are treated in a scholarly fashion; five indices are added as helps to the student.
- De C. Plinii loco inter eruditos controverso ex lib. VII. Atque etiam morbus est aliquis per sapientiam mori. Considerable controversy resulted from his interpretation of Pliny (see Carlos Sommervogel, infra).
- Commentarii in Ecclesiasten, liber unus (folio, pp. 1224; Seville, 1619), appeared in various editions, as did the commentary on Solomon.

What astounds one most in the writings of this exegete of the old school is his vast knowledge, not merely of Latin, but of Greek and Hebrew.
