= Hebrew republic =

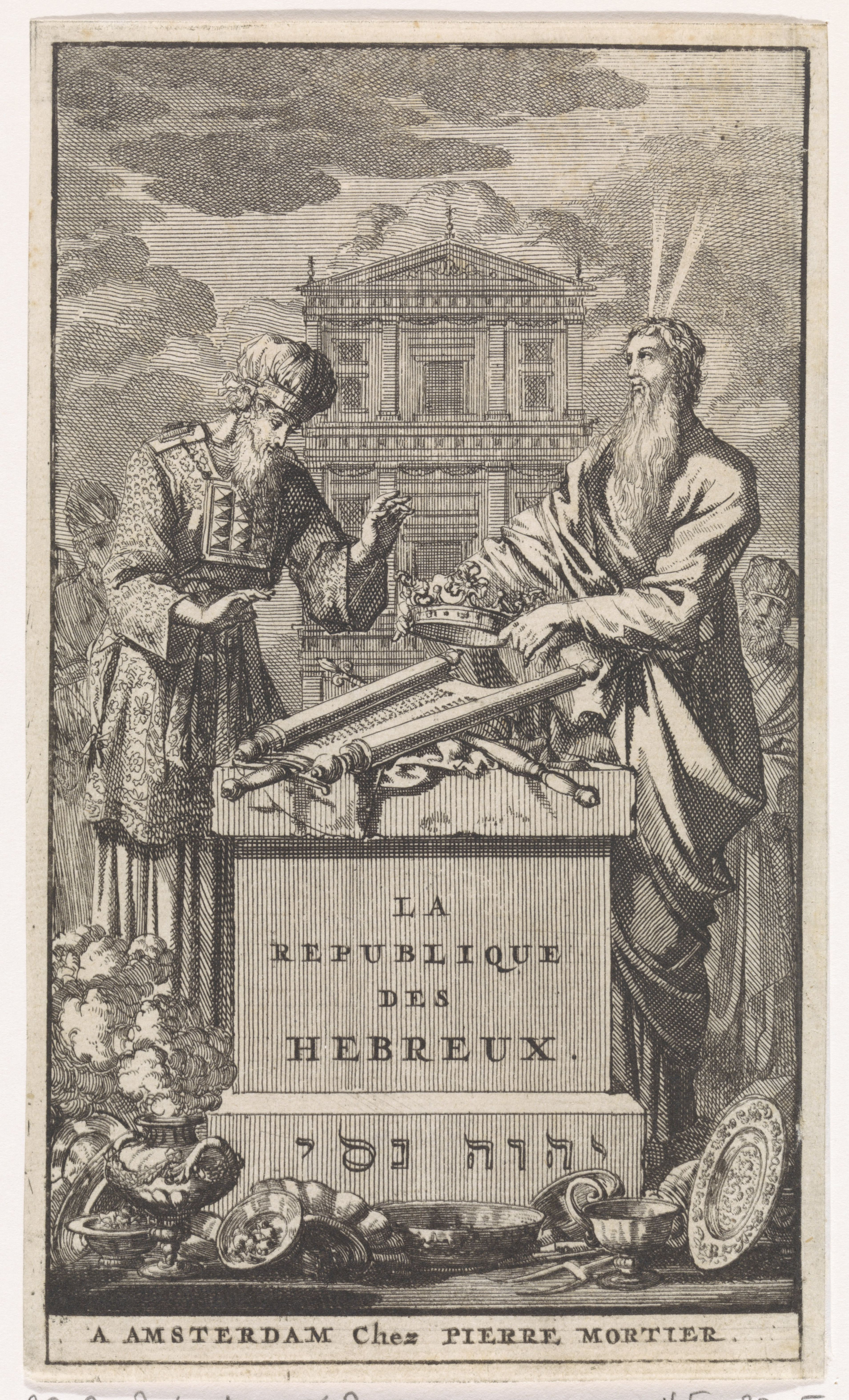
Petrus Cunaeus. La republique des Hebreux, Amsterdam: Pieter Mortier, 1705.

The Hebrew Republic (Latin: Respublica Hebraeorum) is a concept from the early modern period in which the Hebrew Bible was regarded as constitutionally framing a perfect and republican government designed by God for the children of Israel.

In 1582, Carlo Sigonio published a text entitled De Republica Hebraeorum. It used the format of the De repubblica Athenensium manual. The question of the political structure in ancient Israel had already been addressed before, but Sigonio was the first to adopt a systematic approach. However, he did not know Hebrew and so used the translation of the Septuagint, giving rise to not a few problems.

Among the most notable works in the genre are “De Republica Hebraeorum” by Petrus Cunaeus and Eric Nelson's "The Hebrew Republic". A Catholic contributor to the respublica Hebraeorum genre was the Jesuit Giovanni Stefano Menochio, who published his own De republica Hebraeorum in 1648.

== See also ==
- Multitude (philosophy)
- Tractatus Theologico-Politicus
