= Giovanni Stefano Menochio =

Italian Jesuit biblical scholar

Reverend Giovanni Stefano Menochio SJ
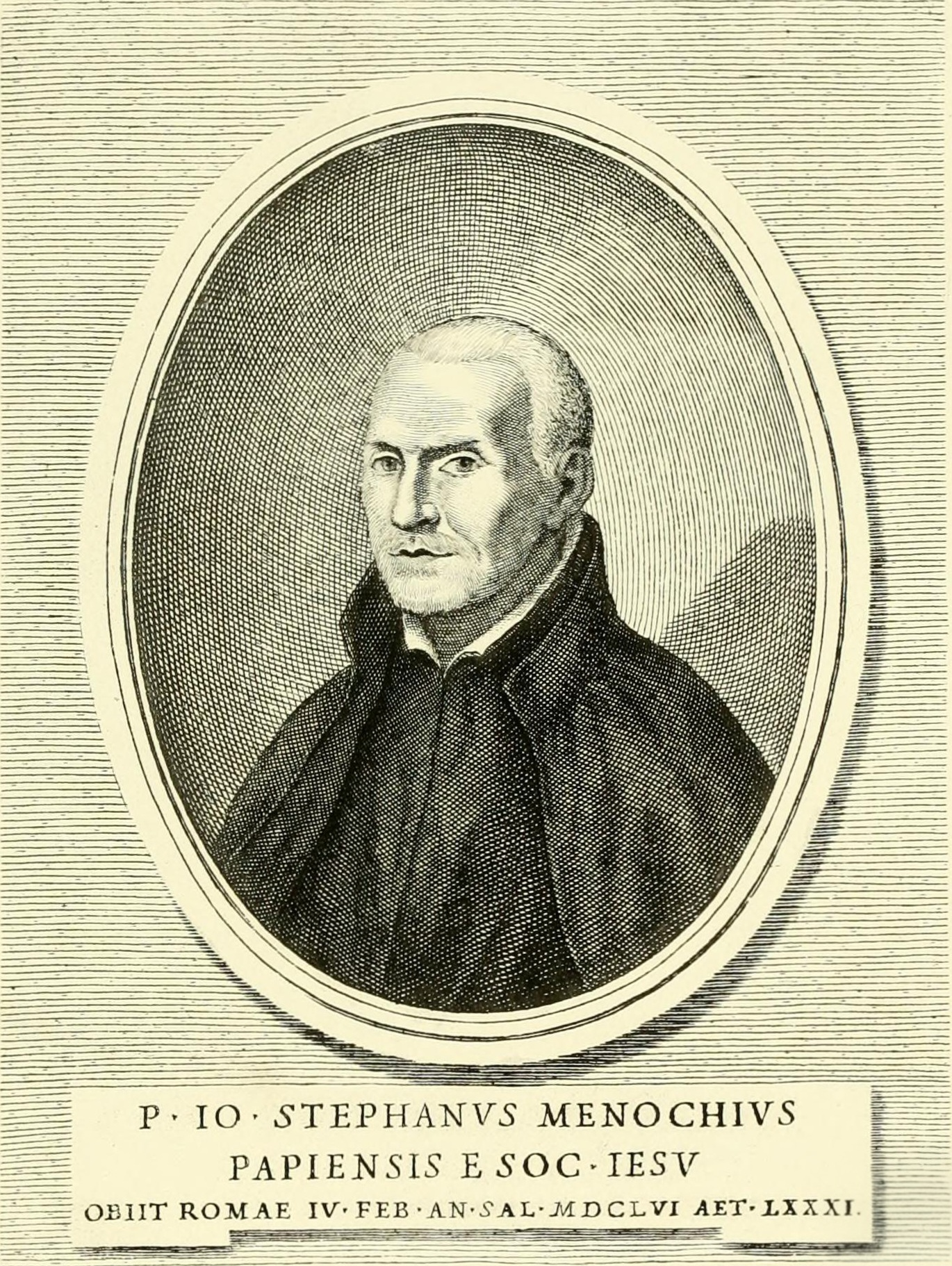
- Giovanni Stefano Menochio
- Born: December 9, 1575; Padua, Republic of Venice
- Died: 4 February 1655 (aged 79); Rome, Papal States
- Other name: Giovanni Corona
- Occupations: Catholic priest, biblical scholar, university teacher
- Known for: Brevis Explicatio Sensus Literalis Sacræ Scripturæ; De republica Hebreorum
- Parent(s): Giacomo Menochio and Margherita Menochio (née Candiani)

Academic background
- Education: Jesuit Brera College (Milan)

Academic work
- Discipline: Biblical studies, Hebrew language
- Institutions: Roman College

Giovanni Stefano Menochio SJ (9 December 1575 – 4 February 1655) was an Italian Jesuit biblical scholar.

== Life ==
Menochio was born at Padua, and entered the Society of Jesus on 25 May 1594. After the usual years of training and teaching the classics, he became professor of sacred scripture and then of moral theology at Milan; thereafter began his long life of superiorship. He was successively superior of Cremona, Milan, and Genoa, rector of the Roman College, provincial of the provinces of Milan and Rome, assistant of Italy, and admonitor to the Fathers-General Vincenzo Carafa and Francesco Piccolomini. He died in Rome.

== Works ==
His first exegetical essay was a politico-Biblical study: Hieropoliticon, sive Institutiones Politicæ e Sacris Scripturis depromptæ, 956 pages (Lyon, 1625). This book on theocratic politics was dedicated to Cardinal Alessandro Orsini. A second edition (Cologne, 1626) was dedicated to Ferdinand III. The Jesuit poet Sarbiewski made this study the subject of an ode (see "Lyrica", II, n. 18).

The next year there appeared an economic study of the Bible: Institutiones Œconomicæ ex Sacris Litteris depromptæ, 543 pages (Lyon, 1627). The author translated into Italian these lessons on the care of one's own household; this translation was a posthumous publication: Economia Christiana, 542 pages (Venice, 1656).

His magnum opus was Brevis Explicatio Sensus Literalis Sacræ Scripturæ optimus quibusque Auctoribus per Epitomen Collecta, 3 vols., 115 pages, 449, 549+29 (Cologne, 1630). Many other editions of this commentary have been published in many lands: Cologne, 1659; Antwerp, 1679; Lyons, 1683, 1697, 1703; the revised edition of René-Joseph Tournemine, published at Paris, 1719, 1721, 1731; Avignon, 1768; Ghent, 1829; the enlarged and revised edition of Francesco Antonio Zaccaria, published at Venice, 1743, 1755, 1761.

The scholia of Menochio are introduced into the Biblia Magna and the Biblia Maxima of Jean de La Haye; the Biblia Sacra of Lucas Brugensis; the Cursus Scripturæ Sacræ of Migne; fourteen editions of the Sainte Bible of Louis de Carrières; and La Sainte Bible of Claude-Joseph Drioux (Paris, 1873).

A later critic, Simon, though not at all in sympathy with Menochio's orthodoxy, says "C'est un des plus judicieux scoliates que nous ayons tant sur le Vieux que sur le Nouveau Testament" (Hist. Crit. du N. T., xliv). Reusch (Kirchenlexikon) prefers the notes of Menochio to those of Manuel de Sá and Mariana.

This commentator sought to find the literal meaning of the Bible and the Church Fathers. Menochio studied the text in its original, and brought to bear upon that study knowledge of Jewish antiquities.

== Main works ==
Economica Christiana, Venice, Baba, 1656

- Menochio, Giovanni Stefano (1625). Hieropoliticωn siue Institutiones politicæ e S. Scripturis depromptæ, libri tres (in Latin). Lugduni: Sumptibus Ludovici Prost, haeredis Roville.
- Menochio, Giovanni Stefano (1627). Institutionis oeconomicae ex sacris litteris depromptae libri duo (in Latin). Lugduni: ex officina Rouilliana : sumptib. Andreae et Iacobi Prost.
- Menochio, Giovanni Stefano (1630). Brevis explicatio sensus litteralis totius Scripturae (in Latin). Coloniae Agrippinae: Ioannes Kinchius.
- Le stuore, tessute di varia erudizione sacra, morale e profana (Rome, 1646–54, 6 vols.); the first published under the fictitious name of Giovanni Corona.
- Menochio, Giovanni Stefano (1648). De republica Hebreorum (in Latin). Parisiis: sumptibus Antonii Bertier, via Iacobæa, sub signo Fortunæ.

== See also ==
- Hebrew republic
