= Domenico Viva =

Italian Jesuit theologian

Domenico Viva (19 October 1648 – 5 July 1726) was an Italian Jesuit theologian.

== Life ==
Viva was born at Lecce, and entered the Society of Jesus 12 May 1663. He taught the humanities and Greek, nine years' philosophy, eight years moral theology, eight years' Scholastic theology, was two years prefect of studies, was rector of the College of Naples in 1711, and provincial of Naples.

== Works ==
Viva's major work is Trutina theologica damnatarum thesium (1708), a theological treatise in four parts and two volumes. In the first volume are enumerated the propositions condemned by three popes: 45 by Alexander VII, 65 by Innocent XI, 39 by Alexander VIII, and the five condemned propositions of the Augustinus of Jansenius. The second volume is devoted to the study and refutation of the 101 propositions of Quesnel, condemned by the Bull Unigenitus of Clement XI in 1713.

The first volume was published in 1708 and by 1757 had reached sixteen editions; in the same period, the second volume went through six editions. Some editions included commentary by Antonio Zaccharia, librarian of the House of Este. Zaccharia cites pontifical documents and argues in Viva's defense against Daniel Concina, Giovanni Vincenzo Patuzzi, and others. The third edition (Benevento, 1717) contains a treatise in which appeal to a future council is declared illegal when the pope has spoken and the Church, spread over the entire world, has accepted his judgment; the testimony of the oecumenical councils and the assemblies of the French clergy are offered as evidence.

Viva's other works include:

- "Enchiridion", a work relating to the jubilee, especially that of the Holy Year, and in general concerning indulgences
- a course of theology for schools, compiled from his lectures at the college of Naples
- Opuscula theologico-moralia, for students
- a course of moral theology, quoted by figures including Alphonsus Liguori and Claude Lacroix
