= Barrada =

Barrada is a surname. Notable people with the surname include:

- Abdelaziz Barrada (1989–2024), French-Moroccan footballer
- Yto Barrada (born 1971), French-Moroccan visual artist

== See also ==
- Barradas, Spanish and Portuguese surname
