= Bedan =

Biblical deliverer of the Israelites

Bedan (Hebrew: בְּדָן Bəḏān) is named as one of the deliverer of Israelites in 1 Samuel 12:11.

He is not mentioned elsewhere as a judge of Israel. Bishop Simon Patrick and others (including the Talmud) posit the name to be a contraction of ben Dan ("the son of Dan") by which they suppose Samson is meant, as the Targum reads. The Septuagint, Syriac, and Arabic, however, refer to the name as Barak, instead of Bedan; and the two latter versions list in that verse Samson as the last deliverer of the Israelites, instead of Samuel. These readings are adopted by Charles François Houbigant, and appear to be genuine, for it is not probable that Samuel would enumerate himself. The letters forming Bedan (בדן) Barak (ברק) in the Hebrew are very similar, and a scribe might easily have written the one for the other, and the mistake might well have been perpetuated. Others contend that this is no mistake, but that Bedan (B'dan) is simply a variant or contracted form of the name Abdon.

Bedan is the name of a descendant of Manasseh in 1 Chronicles 7:17
