= Louis Cappel =

French Protestant churchman and scholar

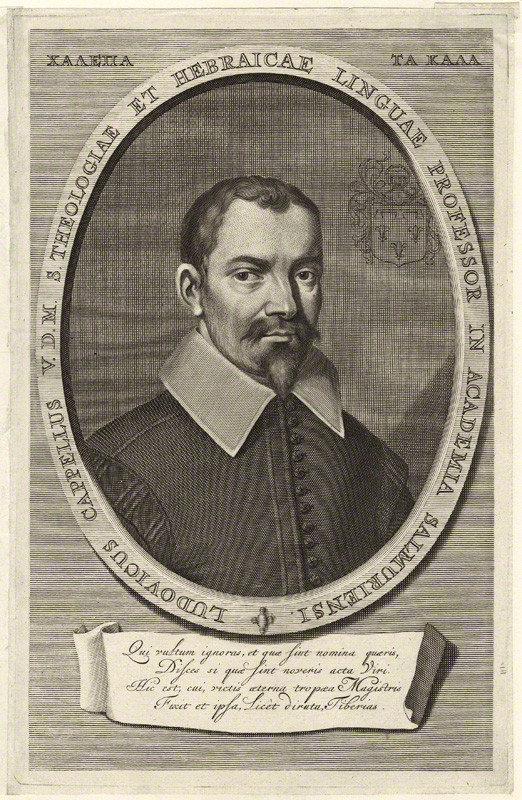
- Born: 15 October 1585; St Elier, near Sedan, France
- Died: 18 June 1658 (aged 72)
- Occupation: French churchman

Louis Cappel (15 October 1585 – 18 June 1658) was a French Protestant churchman and scholar. A Huguenot, he was born at St Elier, near Sedan. He studied theology at the Academy of Sedan and the Academy of Saumur, and Arabic at the University of Oxford, where he spent two years. At the age of twenty-eight, he accepted the chair of Hebrew at Saumur and, twenty years later, was appointed professor of theology. Amongst his fellow lecturers were Moses Amyraut and Josué de la Place.

== Writings on the Hebrew Biblical text ==
As a Hebrew scholar Cappel made a special study of the history of the Hebrew Masoretic Text of the Bible, which led him to the conclusion that the vowel points and accents are not an original part of the Hebrew language, but had been inserted by the Masorete Jews, no earlier than the 5th century; he also concluded that the primitive Hebrew characters are those now known as the Samaritan, while the square characters are Aramaic and were substituted for the more ancient at the time of the Babylonian captivity. He published his conclusions anonymously, but with the express support of Thomas van Erpe, in his book Arcanum punctuationis revelatum (Leiden, 1624).

Cappel's views were not a complete novelty. Nearly a century earlier, Elias Levita (1469–1549) demonstrated in 1538 that neither Jerome nor the Talmud showed any acquaintance with the vowel points, a comparatively recent Jewish invention. In response to the claim that Protestants, in spite of their claim to follow nothing but Scripture alone (sola scriptura), were thus dependent in reality on Jewish tradition, many Protestants declared that the vowel points were in fact ancient and an essential part of the divinely inspired Scripture. Foremost among the upholders of this view were Johannes Buxtorf senior and his son Johannes Buxtorf II.

In 1634 Cappel had already completed work on a second important work, Critica sacra: sive de variis quae in sacris Veteris Testamenti libris occurrunt lectionibus (Sacred Criticism: Variant Readings in the Books of the Old Testament), but because of the fierce opposition of his co-religionists was able to print it only in 1650, by aid of a son, who had turned Catholic (according to the Encyclopædia Britannica Eleventh Edition) or (according to Michael C. Legaspi in 2010) of the Catholic priest-scholar Jean Morin.

In this book, Cappel not only raised questions about the age of the vowel points in the Hebrew Bible: he denied that even the surviving consonantal Hebrew text preserved the autographs of scripture. He distinguished between the divinely inspired content of Scripture and the wholly human process of its transmission in texts that are produced by human hands with variants due above all to scribal errors and that need emendation with the help of the versions and of conjecture. The variant readings in the text and the differences between the ancient versions and the Masoretic text convinced him that the idea of the integrity of the Hebrew text, as commonly held by Protestants, was untenable. This amounted to an attack on the verbal inspiration of Scripture. Bitter, however, as was the opposition to his views, it was not long before his results were accepted by scholars.

Crawford Howell Toy and Karl Heinrich Cornill state in The Jewish Encyclopedia: "It is to the lasting credit of Cappel that he was the first who dared to undertake, with exemplary clearness, penetration, and method, a purely philologic and scientific treatment of the text of the Bible."

== Other writings ==
Cappel was also the author of Annotationes et commentarii in Vetus Testamentum and other biblical works, as well as of several other treatises on Hebrew, among which are the Diatribe de veris et antiquis Ebraeorum literis (1645). His Commentarius de Capellorum gente, giving an account of the Cappel family to which he belonged, was published by his nephew James Cappel (1639–1722), who, at the age of eighteen, became professor of Hebrew at Saumur, but, on the revocation of the edict of Nantes, fled to England.
