= Claude-Joseph Drioux =

French Catholic priest and educator (1820–1898)

Abbé Claude-Joseph Drioux (17 February 1820 – 13 May 1898) was a French priest, popular educator, cartographer, geographer, historian, and religious writer.

== Biography ==
Drioux was born 17 February 1820 at Bourdons, Haute-Marne. After ordination as a priest he became a professor at the seminary of Langres, vicar general, and finally a canon.

Drioux was the "star author" of the publishers Belin. His 51 school textbooks enjoyed great vogue in France for over thirty years and some ran to 30 editions: "they almost had a monopoly on the education of children of both sexes in the free institutions both primary and secondary schools of our country". The total number of books sold exceeded one million. This author derived a steady income from Belin, allowing him to purchase the Chateau de Lanty-sur-Aube, Haute-Marne, Champagne, France, former property of the Marquise de Coligny, where he died 13 May 1898.

As a religious writer and popular educator Drioux was influential among adults as well as schoolchildren, bringing the findings of German scholars to the popular French audience. His pictorial Bible (1864) and history of Rome (1876) contain many interpretations evidently sourced from contemporary German sources, but also renaissance sources such as Menochius. Perhaps independently, he identified the "five brothers" as the sons of Annas and the "rich man" as Caiaphas in the parable of Lazarus in Luke 16.

As a geographer, Drioux worked primarily with cartographer Charles Leroy. As an editor of Latin theological works, he worked with a series of co-editors.

== Works ==
- 1859 Nouvel Atlas de Géographie Moderne (with Charles Leroy)
- 1864 La Bible populaire : histoire illustrée de l'Ancien et du Nouveau Testament. Paris, Hachette, 1864-1865. 2 vol.
- 1876 Cours abrégé d'histoire romaine: depuis la foundation de Rome jusqu'à l'invasion des Arabes.
- 1867 Atlas Universel et Classique de Géographie (with Charles Leroy)
- 1878 Cosmographie ou Tableau des Systèmes du Monde (with Charles Leroy)
- 1872 La Sainte Bible en latin et en français avec les commentaires de Ménochius et des notes historiques et théologiques, 8 vols. Paris, Berche et Tralin Paris (reissued 1892 - this parallel text of the Vulgate and the French paraphrase translation by R.P. De Carrières contained both the comments of Menochius and those of Drioux on the French.)
- 1880 Thomas Aquinas Summa Theologica (one of three translator-editors)
- 1881 Nouvel Atlas Universel et Classique de Géographie
