= Church of San Ildefonso, Toledo =

Church building in Toledo, Spain

Coordinates: 39.8581°N 4.0261°W

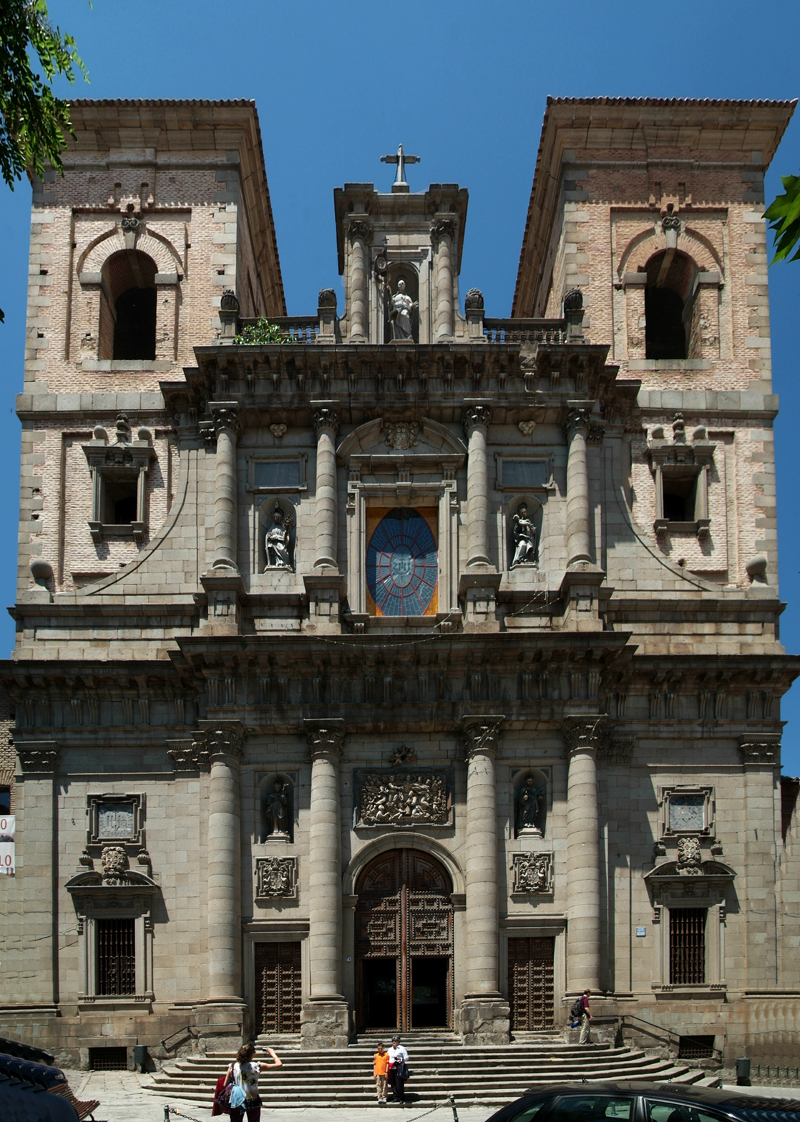
Façade of the Iglesia de San Ildefonso

The Church of San Ildefonso (Spanish: Iglesia de San Ildefonso) is a Baroque style church located in the historic center of the city of Toledo, in Castile-La Mancha, Spain. It is also known as the Jesuit church and is consecrated to Saint Ildefonso of Toledo, patron of the city and Father of the Church.

== Construction ==
Its construction took more than 100 years. Work began in 1629 on lands acquired by the Jesuits of Toledo in 1569. The location hosted the houses of Juan Hurtado de Mendoza Rojas y Guzmán, count of Orgaz. It was the birthplace of Saint Ildefonsus. Pedro and Estefanía Manrique, high Castilian nobility's members, were the promoters of the erection of the temple, as it was written in the founding documents:

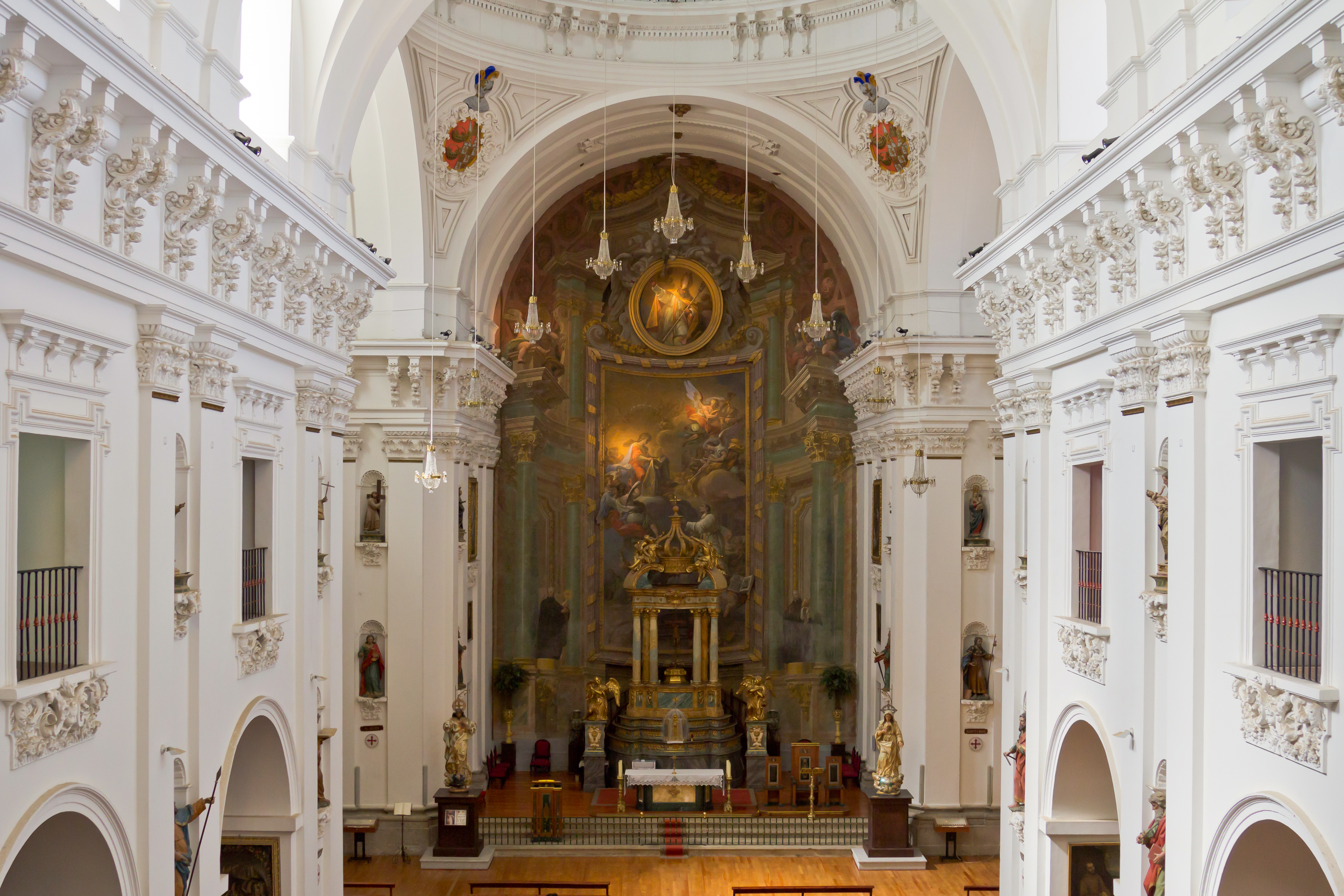
Interior of the church

Since it is tradition that the glorious saint Ildefonso, archbishop and patron of the city, was born in these houses where we now make this foundation, and because of the great devotion that we, Don Pedro and Doña Estefanía Manrique, have to this glorious saint, we want and it is our will that the invocation of the said church, that is to be so, be of this glorious saint and that its image be placed in the altarpiece of the high altar in the most main place.

— Founding document.

Its approach followed the example of the Jesuit churches of Palencia and Alcalá de Henares and that of the Church of the Gesù, in Rome. It is the main church of the Company of Jesus. This trace has been attributed to Jan Bautista Monegro, at that time the master of the Cathedral. Jesuit architect Pedro Sánchez, a Jesuit brother, was in charge of the construction of the temple. Sánchez died in 1633 and was replaced by another companion of his order, Francisco Bautista, who built the facade and reredos in Baroque style. In 1669, Bautista left his place to Bartolomé Zumbigo, native architect of Toledo, who finished the towers and the facade. San Ildefonso was consecrated in 1718, although the sacristy, the main chapel and the octave, which contains the reliquary were incomplete. In 1765, the temple was finally completed under the direction of Jose Hernandez Sierra, architect of Salamanca. Unfortunately for the order of the Jesuits, only two years after the expulsion from Spain by order of king Charles III of Spain under the charge of instigating the Esquilache Riots, which had taken place in 1766. The Company of Jesus did not recover the church until the twentieth century.

== See also ==
- List of Jesuit sites
