= Charles François Houbigant =

French Oratorian biblical scholar

Charles François Houbigant, Cong.Orat. (1686 – 31 October 1783) was a French Oratorian biblical scholar.

== Life ==
Houbigant was born in 1686 in Paris. He entered the Congregation of the Oratory of Jesus in 1704 and, after his studies, taught successively the classics at Juilly, rhetoric at Marseille, and philosophy at Soissons. Returning to Paris, he was in 1722 at the head of the Conference of Church Antiquities and Discipline of St-Magloire. Overwork brought upon him a severe sickness, from which he lost in a very peculiar way the sense of hearing: while unable to hear the noise of the cannon of the Bastille, he could hear the scratching of his pen on the paper. In consequence of this infirmity he availed himself of the scholarship founded by Louis de Carrières to promote biblical studies in the Oratory and thenceforth devoted his talents to mastering Semitic languages.

His conversation was amiable, without the sarcasm pervading some pages of his writings. He founded at Avilly-Saint-Léonard a school for girls, in which he set up a complete outfit for the printing of his books, himself acting as typesetter.

Houbigant died on 31 October 1783 in Paris.

== Works ==
His first work, issued in 1732 (Paris), was a vocabulary of Hebrew roots, Racines hebraïques sans points-voyelles, compiled after the manner of Lancelot's long famous Jardin des racines grecques. In 1746 he published his Prolegomena in Scripturam Sacram (2 vols., 4to) and a Latin translation of the Psalms, Psalmorum versio vulgata et versio nova ad hebraicam veritatem facta (16mo), followed two years later (1748) by a critical edition of the Hebrew Psalter, Psalmi hebraici mendis quam plurim is expurgati (Leyden, 16mo). These volumes were but the forerunners of his great work, Biblia hebraica cum notis criticis et versione latinâ ad notas criticas factâ; accedunt libri græci qui deutero-canonici vocantur in tres classes distributi (4 vols., folio, Paris, 1753–54). This important publication, to the preparation of which he had devoted twenty years of labour, in itself a masterpiece of typography, was based on the text of Van der Hooght (edit. of 1705), which it reproduced without vocal signs and with many corrections suggested either in the margin or in tables at the end of each volume. The Latin translation was also published separately in eight octavo volumes under the title, Veteris Testamenti versio nova ad hebraicam veritatem facta (Paris, 1753).

From Houbigant's versatile pen later on proceeded French translations of some English books, as Forbes's Thoughts, Sherlock's Sermons (1768), and Lesley's Method against Deists and Jews (1770). Other works published during the same period, as the Examen du Psautier français des RR. PP. Capucins (The Hague, 1764), the Conférence entre un Juif, un protestant et un docteur de Sorbonne (Leyden, 1770), the Notæ criticæ in universos Veteris Testamenti libros tum hebraice tum græce scriptos, cum integris Prolegomenis ad exemplar Parisiense denuo recensæ (2 vols., 4to, Frankfort, 1777), are evidence that Houbigant had not at this period abandoned his favourite studies.

Some time before his death, however, he had lost his eyesight and fallen into dotage. Among the papers found after his death were a life of Cardinal de Bérulle, a treatise on the coming of Elias, a Hebrew grammar, and notes on the theory of Astruc touching the composition of Genesis.

His works on Hebrew philology have fallen into oblivion; the deliberate discarding of vocal signs and the unlikely and unwarranted pronunciation adopted foredoomed them to failure. On the other hand, his Latin translation of the Bible is, for the clearness, energy, and polish of the language, deservedly praised; not so, however, all the rules of textual criticism laid down in the "Prolegomena", and the application of these rules in the "Biblia hebraica" marred by too many unnecessary and conjectural corrections of the Masoretic text.
