= Mordecai Astruc =

French Jewish liturgical poet

Mordecai Astruc (Hebrew: מרדכי אסטרוק; fl. late 17th century) was a Jewish liturgical poet from Carpentras, France. He was the author of several piyyutim printed in Seder ha-Tamid (Avignon, 1760), a collection of prayers used in the Provençal rite practiced at Carpentras, Isle, Avignon, and Cavaillon by the Papal Jews.

One of his notable works is a prayer of thanksgiving beginning "Ish hayah be-tam lebabo," well known for the circumstances that led to its creation. In 1682 a Jew of Carpentras was murdered, and a mob attacked the Jews' quarters. A riot was narrowly averted by the intervention of the authorities. In response, the community established the day on which the disturbance occurred (the 9th of Nisan) as a feast-day in memory of the rescue. This poem was selected to be recited in the synagogue on this occasion.
