= Cyril Astruc =

French-Israeli businessman (born 1973)

- Born: May 3, 1973; Mantes-la-Jolie, France
- Other name: Alex Khann
- Occupations: Businessman, Insurance Agent
- Known for: Missing-trader fraud on carbon quotas
- Criminal charges: Tax fraud, Embezzlement
- Criminal penalty: 3 years imprisonment (2003); fugitive since 2017
- Criminal status: Wanted by Interpol (Red Notice)

Cyril Astruc, born 3 May 1973 at Mantes-la-Jolie, alias Alex Khann, is a French-Israeli businessman and insurance agent known for being indicted in a missing-trader fraud scheme.

Indicted in several frauds in France and England, he was sentenced to three years of prison in 2003 before becoming a fugitive. He is known for his role in a missing-trader fraud on carbon quotas taxes in 2008 and is suspected to have embezzled over €100 million.

French justice and Interpol released a red notice targeting him. He was living between Israel and the United States until his arrest in 2014. His trial started in 2017, and he was present for it until he fled abroad just before his conviction. He has been sought by international police since.

== Fraud on carbon quotas ==
The fraud scheme on the carbon quotas tax took place between November 2008 and June 2009. Astruc is strongly suspected to have been involved in it, and a report of the 2012 investigation described him as a "living legend" of the fraud. The fraud cost France about €1.6B and the European Union up to €6B.
