= Bartolommeo Gavanto =

Italian Barnabite priest and liturgist

Bartolommeo Gavanto CRSP (Latin: Gavantus, Monza, Duchy of Milan 1569 – Milan, 14 August 1638) was an Italian Barnabite priest and liturgist.

== Life ==
Gavanto devoted himself early to liturgical studies. At Rome he was recognized as having a most accurate knowledge of the sacred rites. Gavanto was elected the Superior General of his Order, and, in recognition of his services, was named perpetual consultor to the Sacred Congregation of Rites by Pope Urban VIII.

== Works ==
Gavanto's chief work is entitled Thesaurus sacrorum rituum seu commentaria in rubricas Missalis et Breviarii Romani (Milan, 1628; revised ed. by Cajetani-Mariæ Merati, Rome, 1736–38). In this work the author traces the historical origin of the sacred rites themselves, treats of their mystical significance, gives rules as to the observance and obligation of the rubrics, and adds decrees and brief explanations bearing on the subject-matter of the work. The book was examined and approved by Giovanni Garzia Mellini, Tiberio Muti, and Cajetan, and was dedicated to his patron, Pope Urban.
