= Cappel family =

The Cappel family was a French family which produced distinguished jurists and theologians in the 15th and 16th centuries. The family also took the Latin name Tillaeus based on the fief le Tilloy.

In 1491, Guillaume Cappel, as rector of the University of Paris, protested against a tithe which Pope Innocent VIII claimed from that body. His nephew, Jacques Cappel (Johannes Tillaeus in Latin; died 1541), the real founder of the family, was himself advocate-general at the parlement of Paris. In a celebrated address delivered before the court in 1537, against the emperor Charles V, he claimed for King Francis I the counties of Artois, Flanders, and Charolais. He left nine children, of whom three became Protestants. The eldest, Jacques (1529–1586), sieur du Tilloy, wrote several treatises on jurisprudence. Louis (1534–1586), sieur de Moriambert, the fifth son, was a most ardent Protestant. In 1570 he presented a confession of faith to King Charles IX in the name of his co-religionists. He disputed at Sedan before the duc de Bouillon with the Jesuit, Jean Maldonat (1534–1583), and wrote in defence of Protestantism. The seventh son, Ange (1537–1623), seigneur du Luat, was secretary to King Henry IV, and enjoyed the esteem of Sully. Among those who remained Catholic should be mentioned Guillaume, the translator of Machiavelli. The eldest son Jacques also left two sons, famous in the history of Protestantism: Jacques (1570–1624), pastor of the church founded by himself on his fief of le Tilloy and afterwards at Sedan, where he became professor of Hebrew, distinguished as historian, philologist and exegetical scholar; and Louis. He also used his latinized name Jacobus Tillaeus.

On the protest of Guillaume Cappel, see Du Bellay, Historia Universitatis Parisiensis, vol. v. On the family, see the sketch by another Jacques Cappel, De Capellorum gente, in the Commentarii et notae criticae in Vetus Testamentum of Louis Cappel, his father (Amsterdam, 1689).
