= Sebastião Barradas =

Portuguese preacher

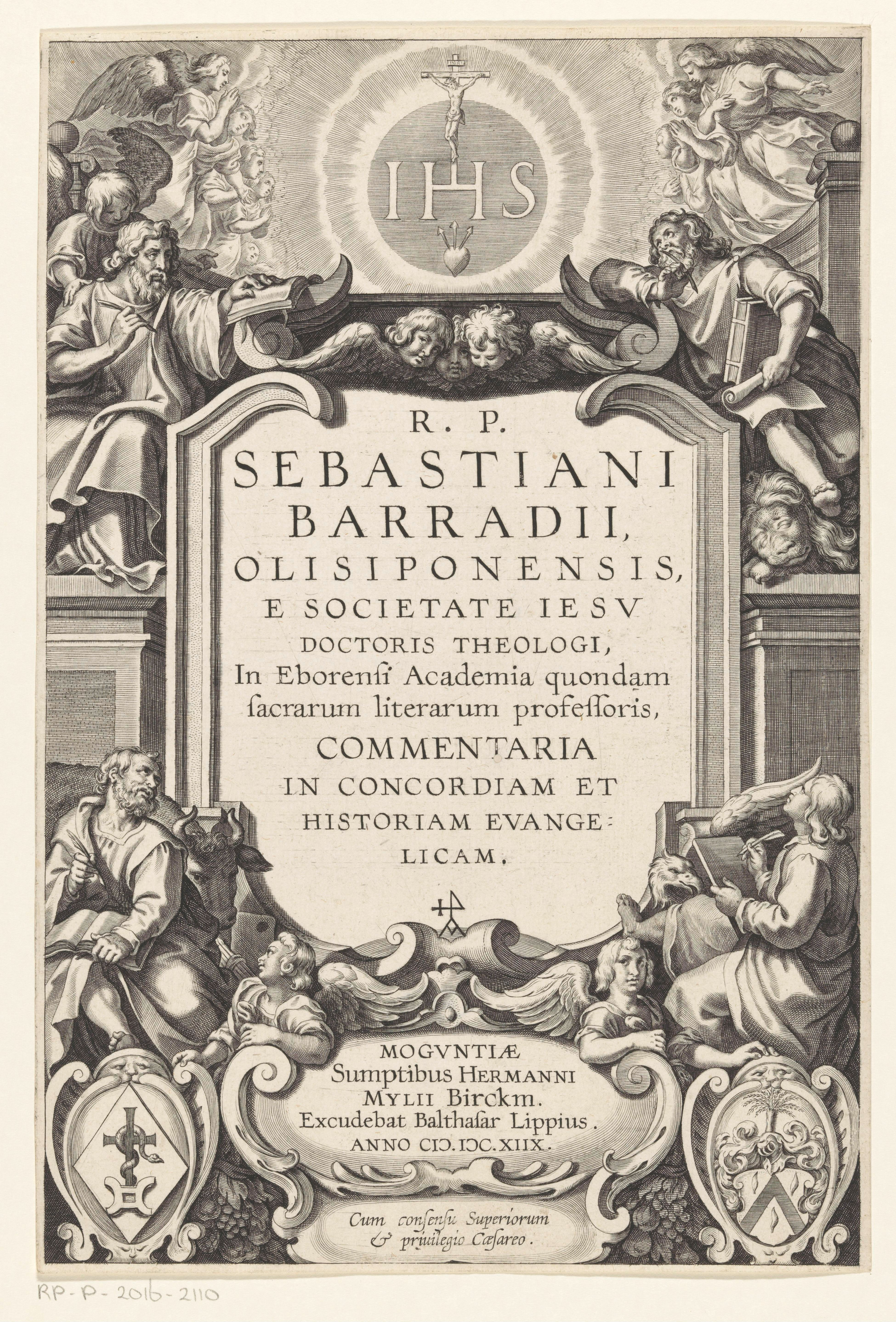
Sebastiani Barradii Olisiponensis e societate Iesu Commentaria in concordiam et historiam Euangelicam. Mainz: Lipp, Balthasar, 1618.

Sebastião Barradas was a Portuguese exegete and preacher.

He was born in Lisbon in 1543 and died in Coimbra in 1615. In 1558, he entered the Society of Jesus. He was a professor of scripture for many years in Coimbra and Évora and was styled the Apostle of Portugal for the zeal of his preaching. He published two works:

- Commentaria in concordiam et historiam evangelicam (4 vols., Coimbra, 1599-1611). This work, intended for preachers on the Gospels, was frequently reprinted in Germany, Italy and France. The last edition was printed at Sugsburg, 1642.
- Itinererarium filiorum Israel ex Aegypto in terram repromissis (Lyons, 1620), a commentary on the Book of Exodus.
