= Jacques Bonfrère =

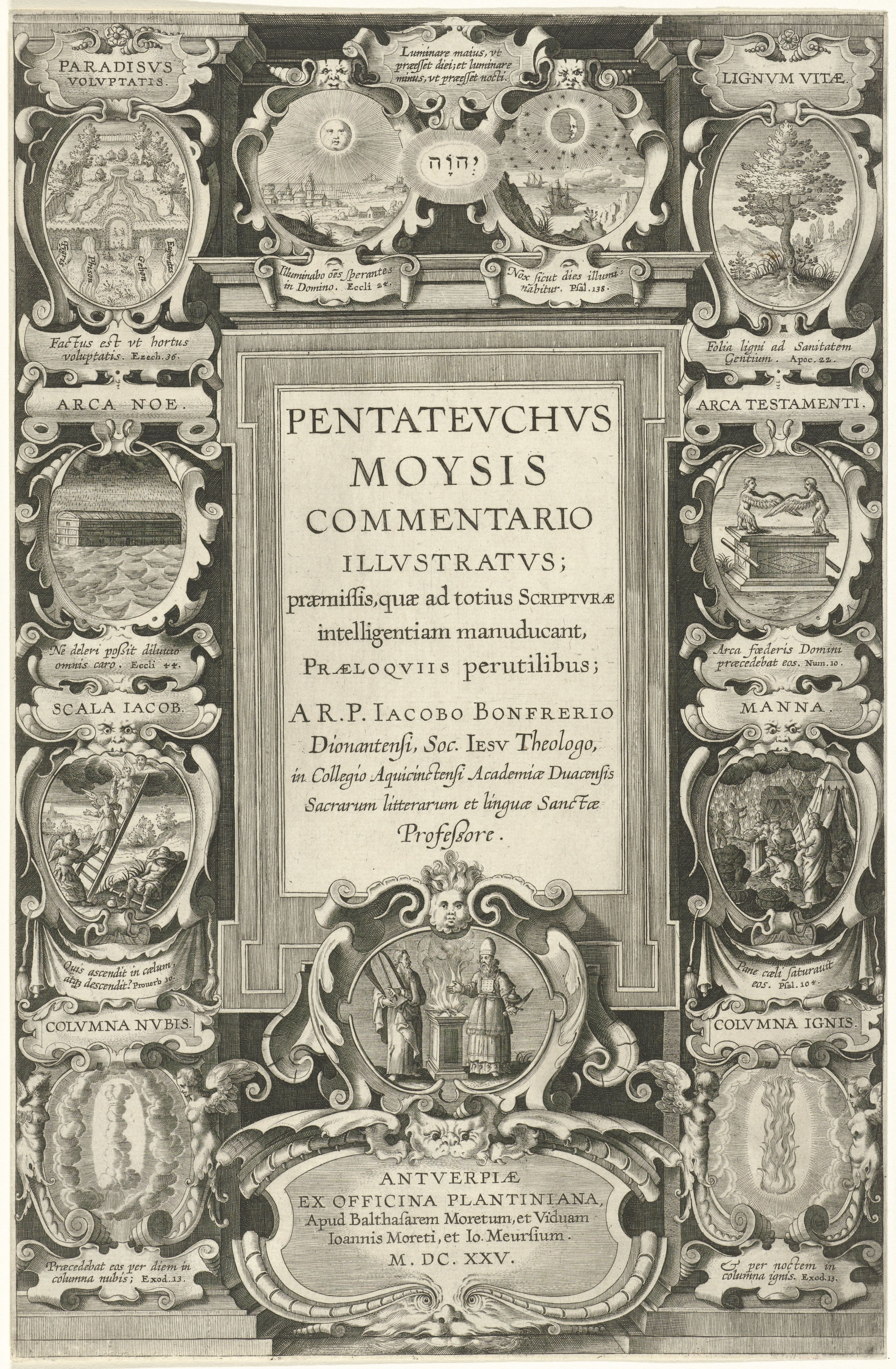
Jacques Bonfrère, Pentateuchus Moysis commentario illustratus, Antwerpen, 1625.

Jacques Bonfrère SJ (12 April 1573, in Dinant, Belgium – 9 May 1642, in Tournai, Belgium) was a Jesuit priest, Biblical scholar and leading commentator on the Old Testament.

== Life ==
Bonfrere entered the Society of Jesus in 1592. After having taught rhetoric, philosophy, and theology, he devoted himself to the Sacred Scriptures. He was long a professor of Scripture and Hebrew at Douai, where he was Superior of the Scots College. François Sweerts, in his Atheneae Belgicae, speaks of him as a man of rare virtue; he praises his industry and prudence, as well as the penetration of his mind and the solidity of his judgment.

== Works ==
Bonfrère owes his fame to his work in the department of Sacred Scriptures, into which, he tells us, he had been initiated by Cornelius a Lapide. His Praeloquia was, in 1839, selected by Jacques Paul Migne as the most suitable treatise or general introduction with which to begin his Sacrae Scripturae Cursus Completus (I, cols. 5–242). In this work, Bonfrère deals with subjects pertaining to the Bible as a whole. His selection and treatment of topics was largely determined by the controversies of the time regarding the value of the Vulgate, the obscurity of Scripture, etc. The historical methods now applied to the canon text, and hermeneutics of Sacred Scripture were not known in his time. He deals with inspiration in one chapter (ch. viii: De modo quo Deus cum hisce Scriptoribus hagiographis habuit). The views he sets forth here do not in all respects agree with the teachings of modern Catholic theologians. He holds, for instance, that approval of a writing by God, subsequent to its composition, would suffice to make it canonical. In point of fact, though, he assures us, no book of the Bible was so composed. He then expresses the opinion that when writing on what they knew without revelation, the sacred authors only had the assistance necessary to preserve them from error. He does not make a clear distinction between inspiration and revelation. (See Pesch, De Inspiratione," Nos. 323 and 324).

The "Praeloquia" were published along with a commentary on the Pentateuch in a volume entitled: Pentateuchis Mosis commentario illustatis, praemissis praeloquiis perutilibus (fol., Antwerp, 1625). This was followed by his commentary on Josue, Judges, and Ruth, to which he added a treatise on sacred geography, composed by Eusebius and translated by Jerome: Josue, Judices et Ruth commentario illustarti. Accessit Onomasticon (fol. Paris, 1631). Bonfrère had undertaken to explain the Books of Kings before his work on the Pentateuch, he tells us in his preface to the latter; but he had felt the need of going back to the beginning of things. His Libri Regnum et Paralipomenon commentariis illustrati was given to the press in Tournai, in 1643, after his death. But the printing-house was burned, and the work did not appear. Biographers have no reference even to the manuscripts. Bonfrère is said to have left commentaries on nearly all the other books of the Bible. His explanation of the text of scripture shows a very good knowledge of Hebrew, and pays special attention to the places mentioned. His erudition is extensive for his time. The soberness and judiciousness of his comments are generally admired among Catholic theologians.

== Bibliography ==
- Philippe Alegambe, Bibl. Script.
- S.J., Andre, Bib. belgica
- François Sweerts, Athenae Belgicae.
