= Professed house =

Jesuit residence where no member had a stable income

In the Society of Jesus, a professed house was a residence where—in a spirit of radical poverty—no member had a stable income. The Jesuit priests who lived there, all of whom have made the profession of the four vows, undertake their spiritual and pastoral ministry completely for free. With no revenues, these houses were dependent on the generosity of benefactors even for their daily needs. This type of residence disappeared during the 20th century, though some have retained the name if not the form.

== List of professed houses ==
- Rome (1540)
- Lisbon (1542)
- Palermo (1564)
- Toledo (1566)
- Milan (1572)
- Naples (1579)
- Paris (1580)
- Goa (1580)
- Warsaw (1609)
- México (1609)
- Antwerp (1616)

== Bibliography ==
- (in French) Edmond Lamalle: Les catalogues des provinces et des domiciles de la Compagnie de Jesus, AHSI, vol.13, 1944, pp.77-101.
- (in Latin) L. Lukacs: De domiciliorum Societatis paupertate ad mentem S. Ignatii, AHSI, vol.30, 1961, pp.4-19.
- George E. Ganss (ed.): The Constitutions of the Society of Jesus, Saint Louis (USA), 1970.
