= Manuel de Sá =

Portuguese Jesuit priest, theologian and exegete

- Born: 1530; Vila do Conde, Kingdom of Portugal
- Died: 30 December 1596; Arona, Duchy of Milan
- Education: University of Coimbra
- Occupations: Writer, university teacher, philosopher, theologian, biblical scholar
- Employer: Pontifical Gregorian University

Manuel de Sá (b. at Vila do Conde, Province Entre-Minho-e-Douro, 1530; d. at Arona, Italy, 30 December 1596) was a Portuguese Jesuit priest, theologian and exegete.

== History ==
He distinguished himself as a student at the University of Coimbra, and at the age of fifteen joined the Society of Jesus. He soon afterward taught philosophy, first at Coimbra, and next at Gandia, where he also acted as tutor to Francis Borgia, then Duke of Gandia, who was considering joining the Jesuit Order.

In 1557, he became one of the early professors of the Roman College, and commented for two years on the prophecies of prophet Osee and the Summa of Thomas Aquinas. Exhausted by his labours, he discontinued his lectures, and visited the houses of the Society in Tuscany. Restored to health, he returned to the Roman College, where he filled the chair of exegesis, and found time to give missions.

His reputation for scholarship induced Pope Pius V to appoint him as a member of the commission in charge of preparing the authentic edition of the Septuagint. This did not prevent him from continuing his apostolic labours and from founding several houses of his order in Upper Italy. After residing for a time at Genoa, he withdrew to the professed house of Arona (Diocese of Milan), where he died.

== Works ==
His exegetical works are: Scholia in Quatuor Evangelia (Antwerp, 1596), and Notationes in totam Scripturam Sacram (Antwerp, 1598), both of which passed through several editions.

However short, Sá's annotations clearly set forth the literal sense of the Bible, and bespeak a solid erudition, despite a few inaccuracies which have been sharply rebuked by Protestant critics.

His theological treatise entitled Aphorismi Confessariorum ex Doctorum sententiis collecti (Venice, 1595), however remarkable, was censured in 1603, apparently because the Master of the Sacred Palace treated some of its maxims as contrary to opinions commonly received among theologians, but it was later corrected and has been removed from the Roman Index (1900). Sá's life of John of Texeda, the Capuchin confessor of Francis Borgia, when Duke of Gandia, has not been published.

== Main works ==
- Aphorismi Confessariorum (in Latin). Antwerp: ex officina Ioachimi Trognaesij. 1599.
- Scholia in Quatuor Evangelia (in Latin). Antwerp: apud Horatium Cardon. 1602.
