= Jacobus Tirinus =

Belgian Jesuit Biblical scholar

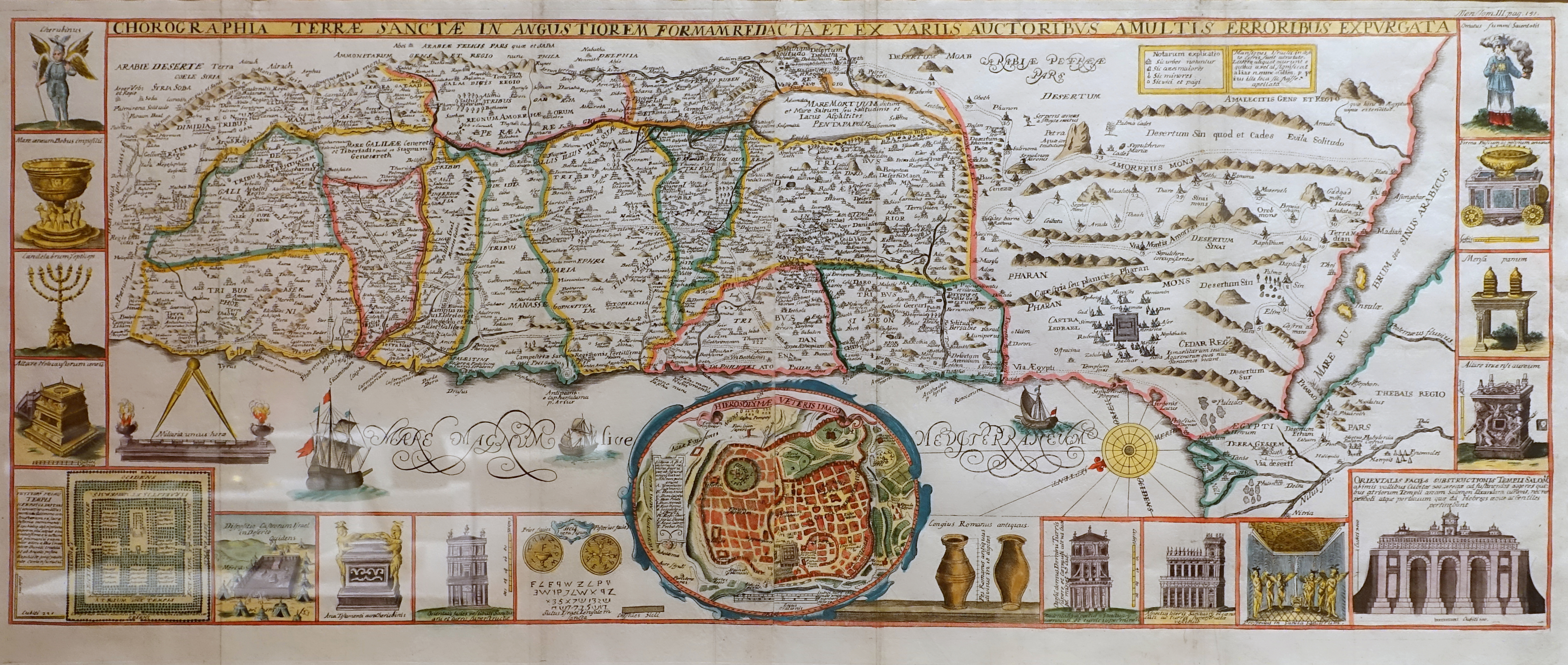
Chorographia Terrae Sanctae, Jacobus Tirinus, Amsterdam, 1630

Jacobus Tirinus (1580–1636) was a Belgian Jesuit Biblical scholar.

== Works and legacy ==
His major work is the Commentarius in Sacram Scripturam, a biblical commentary in two volumes from 1645. He also published a chorography, Chorographia Terrae Sanctae in Angustiorem Formam Redacta, around 1630. He is quoted in George Leo Haydock's Douay Rheims Biblical commentary.
