= Casa di Santo Stefano =

Hungarian pilgrim's hostel in Rome, Italy

Casa di Santo Stefano or Szent István Ház is the Hungarian pilgrim's hostel in Rome, located in Via del Casaletto 481.

== Background ==
The first Hungarian pilgrim's hostel in Rome was established by King Stephen I of Hungary next to the church of Santo Stefano degli Ungheresi in Vatican. The hostel received travelers from the Kingdom of Hungary through 700 years. It was pulled down by Pope Pius VI in 1776 when he built a new sacristy for the St Peter's Basilica.

The Pope gave 7,500 scudos as compensation for the Collegium Germanicum et Hungaricum. Only in the 20th century was the old pilgrim's hostel of St. Stephen re-established by Catholic emigrants who left the country after the 1956 Hungarian Revolution.

== History ==
Erzsébet Fáy became the nurse of a wealthy English gentleman, Lord Oliver Duncan and inherited his fortune. Erzsébet Fáy made contact with József Zágon, the Regent of the Hungarian Papal Institute and leader of the Hungarian emigrant community in Rome. She made a donation for a new pilgrim's hostel.

In 1965 József Zágon bought a parcel in the Gianicolense district of Rome from a lawyer named Pasini for 120 million liras. At that time Via del Casaletto was a rural neighbourhood with pastures and reeds but in the next decades it became a suburb of the growing city.

Hungarian university students who went into exile after 1956 gave 16 million liras for buying the lot. The remaining part of the sum was donated by Hungarians living in the United States and Switzerland.

The modern hostel was inaugurated on 20 August 1967. It is the property of the St. Stephen Foundation but run by the Congregatio Sororum Scholarum de Kalocsa (Kalocsai Iskolanővérek), a Hungarian religious order for women.

Casa di Santo Stefano was visited by the exiled leader of the Catholic Church, József Mindszenty on 2 October 1971. The house is a popular place of accommodation for Hungarian travelers and pilgrims in Rome from Hungary, Romania, Slovakia and other countries. It is decorated with the paintings of an emigrant priest-artist, Péter Prokop and surrounded with a garden.

The Casa di Santo Stefano was consecrated by Cardinal Péter Erdő, Archbishop of Esztergom-Budapest in September 2021. Also present was Miklós Soltész, Hungarian state secretary for church and minority relations.
