= Pietro Ruga =

Italian engraver

Pietro Ruga (died 1850s?) was an Italian engraver, best known for his architectural views (vedute) of Roman monuments, churches and squares.

He also was a draughtsman of a few maps of Rome during the late 18th and early 19th centuries, including Pianta topografica della città di Roma dell' anno 1849. Among the subjects of his engravings are the Basilica di Santa Maria Maggiore, St. Peter's Basilica, Basilica of Santo Stefano Rotondo, Piazza Navona and Piazza del Quirinale.
