= Ratti (surname) =

Ratti is an Italian surname. Notable people with the surname include:

- Achille Ratti (1857–1939), Pope Pius XI
- Carlo Ratti (born 1971), Italian architect, engineer and inventor
- Carlo Giuseppe Ratti (1737–1795), Italian art biographer and painter
- Eddy Ratti (born 1977), Italian former cyclist
- Eugenia Ratti (1933–2020), Italian soprano
- Filippo Walter Ratti (1914–1981), Italian screenwriter and film director
- Francesco Ratti (1819-?), Italian engraver
- Giovanni Agostino Ratti (1699–1755), Italian painter
- Lorenzo Ratti (ca. 1589–1630), Italian baroque composer
- Héber Ignacio Ratti (born 1994), Uruguayan footballer
- James Ratti (born 1991), Welsh rugby union player
- Julia Ratti (born 1969), Democratic member of the Nevada Senate
- Lorenzo Ratti (1589-1630), Italian baroque composer
- Nico Ratti (born 1993), Argentine footballer
- Ratti Petit (1906-1988), Indian painter, photographer, writer and composer
- Steven H. Ratti (born 1956), former United States Coast Guard officer
- Vince Ratti, member of the American pop rock band Zolof the Rock & Roll Destroyer that originated in Philadelphia
