= Richard Gibbons (Jesuit) =

English Jesuit scholar

Richard Gibbons (born at Winchester, 1550 or 1549; died at Douai, 23 June 1632) was an English Jesuit scholar.

== Life ==
After making his early studies in England, and completing a two years' course in philosophy at the Catholic University of Leuven and in the German College at Rome, he entered the Society of Jesus, on 1 September 1572, and continued his studies for three years. After his ordination he taught mathematics for thirteen years, philosophy for ten, scholastic philosophy for three and for some time also Hebrew and Scripture, dividing his time between Italy, France, Portugal, Spain, and Belgium.

For a while he occupied the offices of prefect of studies at Leuven, and of preacher at the Jesuit College at St-Omer. His later years were spent at Douai, in printing ancient manuscripts, and in translating, editing, and annotating various learned works.

The Jesuit John Gibbons was his elder brother.

== Works ==
His works include:

- Historia admiranda de Jesu Christi stigmatibus ab Alphonso Paleato Archiepisc. II. Bononiensi explicata. Accessit tomus II ... Historia admirandæ ... complectens M. Vigerii S.R.E. Cardenalis de praecipuis Incarnati Verbi mysteriis decachordum Christianum (Douai, 1616).
- R. P. Francisci Riberæ . . . in librum Duodecim Prophetarum commentarii . . . (Douai, 1612).
- Historia Anglicana Ecclesiatica a primis gentis susceptæ fidei incunabulis ad nostra fere tempora deducta ... auctore Nicolao Harpsfeldio (Douai, 1622).
- Luidovici de Ponte Meditationum de Vita et Passion Christe Libri II, ex Hispanico in Latinum versi (Cologne, 1612).
- "A Spiritual Doctrine, conteining a Rule to Live Wel, with divers Praiers" (Louvain, 1599).
- "Meditations Uppon the Mysteries of our Holy Faith, with the Practise of Mental Praier ... (Douai?, 1610).
- "The First Part of the Meditations of the Passion and Resurrection of Christ our Saviour" (1614?).
- "Translation of Bellarmine's Christian Doctrine".
