= Ratti =

Ratti may refer to:

- Ratti (unit), traditional Indian unit of mass measurement
- Ratti Gali Lake, an alpine glacial lake located in Neelum Valley, Azad Kashmir, Pakistan
- Ratti (surname), Italian surname
- Ratti family, Italian family
