= Giovanni Battista Tolomei =

Italian Jesuit priest, theologian and cardinal

His Eminence Giovanni Battista Tolomei
- Cardinal-Priest of Santo Stefano al Monte Celio
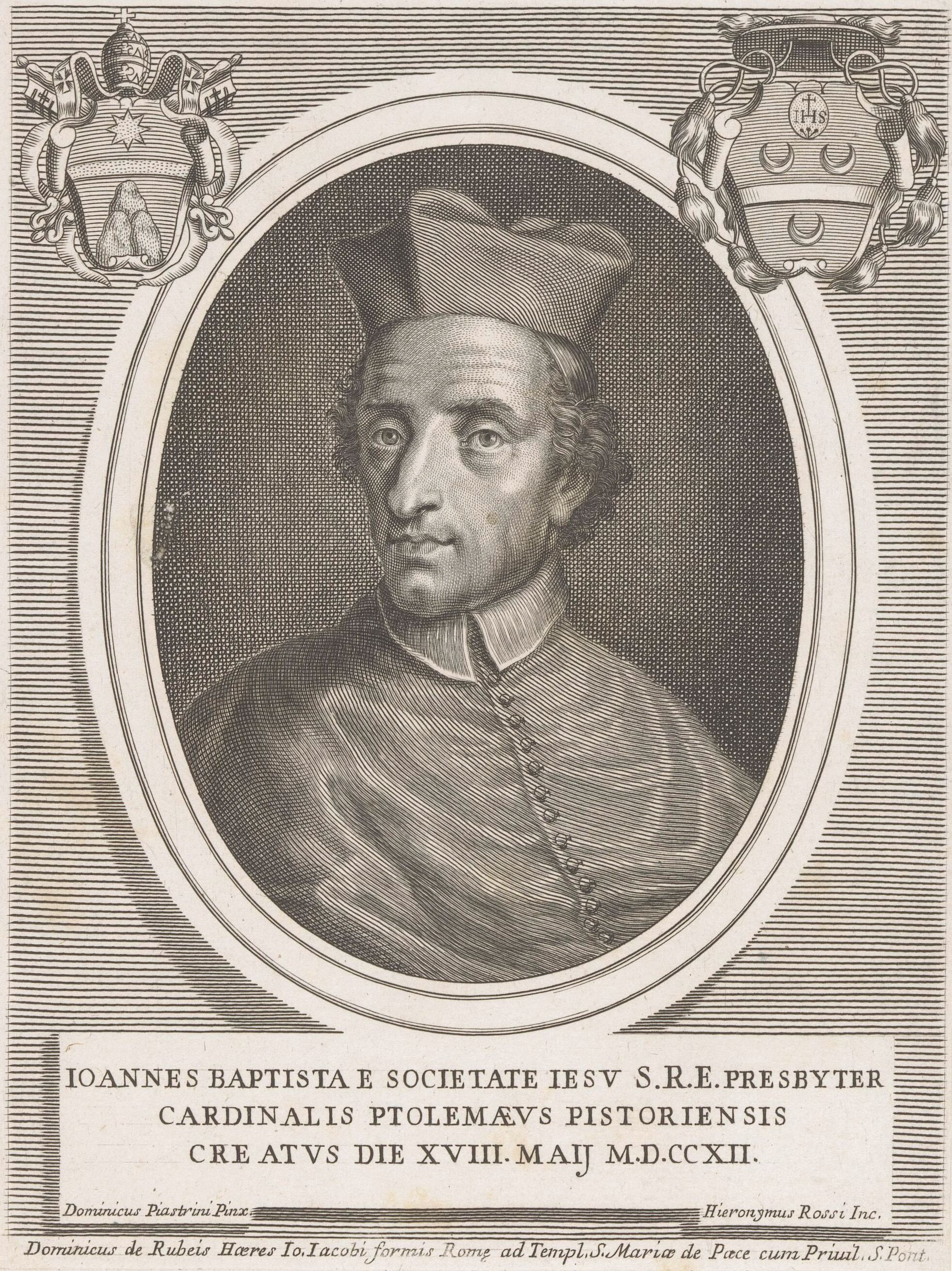
- Giovanni-Battista Tolomei (1653-1726)
- Church: Roman Catholic Church
- Appointed: 18 May 1712
- Term ended: 19 January 1726
- Predecessor: Francesco Bonvisi
- Successor: Giovanni Battista Salerni

Orders
- Ordination: 1684
- Created cardinal: 17 May 1702 by Pope Clement XI
- Rank: Cardinal-Priest

Personal details
- Born: Giovanni Battista Tolomei; 3 December 1653 Pistoia, Grand Duchy of Tuscany
- Died: 19 January 1726 (aged 72) Rome, Papal States
- Education: University of Pisa; Roman College

Giovanni Battista Tolomei SJ (3 December 1653 – 19 January 1726) was an Italian Jesuit priest, theologian, and cardinal.

== Life ==
Tolomei was born of noble parentage at the ancestral castle of the Counts of Capraia (Latin: Camberaia) in the Grand Duchy of Tuscany, located between Pistoia and Florence. At the age of fifteen, after an early schooling at Florence, he studied law at the University of Pisa. On 18 February 1673, he entered the Society of Jesus at Rome, and was ordained a priest in 1684. Although later made a cardinal, he was never raised to the rank of bishop.

Tolomei was master of eleven languages: Latin, Greek, Hebrew, Chaldean, Syriac, Arabic, English, French, Spanish, Illyrian, as well as his native Italian. He began his public career at Rome by expounding the Sacred Scriptures on Sunday evenings in the Church of the Gesù.

At the age of thirty, Tolomei was elected in the General Congregation of the Society as its Procurator General, an office he held for the next five years, relinquishing it to take the Chair of Philosophy at the Roman College (now the Gregorian University). Here, his lecture room was thronged. His lectures were printed in Rome in 1696 under the title of Philosophia mentis et sensuum, and demonstrated that, while loyal to the principles and method of Aristotle, he welcomed every discovery of his time in the natural sciences and wove these into his course. The lectures were reprinted in 1698, in Germany and evoked praise from the noted philosopher, Gottfried Wilhelm Leibniz.

Tolomei later filled the Chair of Theology at the Roman College and revived the courses in controversial dogma begun by St. Robert Bellarmine a century earlier. These lectures in manuscript form filled six volumes in folio but were never printed. Successively Rector of the Roman College and of the German College, he was at the same time Consultor to the Sacred Congregation of Rites, as well as of the Index, and of Indulgences, in addition to being one of the appointed examiners of bishops.

On 17 May 1712, unexpectedly created a cardinal by Pope Clement XI, with the title of Santo Stefano al Monte Coelio, Tolomei became chief adviser to the pope in matters of theology, particularly in the preparation of the condemnation of the ideas of Pasquier Quesnel. As cardinal, he assisted at the conclaves which elected Pope Innocent XIII and Pope Benedict XIII.

Tolomei died at Rome at the Roman College, and was buried before the high altar of the Jesuit Church of St. Ignatius there.

== Works ==
His published works are the Philosophia mentis et sensuum (with the addition of natural theology and ethics, Rome, 1702), De primatu beati Petri (in the second series of the miscellany printed from the manuscripts in the library of the Roman College, Rome, 1867), and a little pamphlet containing Daily Prayers for a Happy Death (in Latin, Vienna, 1742; also in German, Augsburg, 1856).
