= Palazzo di Sant'Apollinare =

Palace in Rome, Italy

Coordinates: 41°54′03″N 12°28′25″E

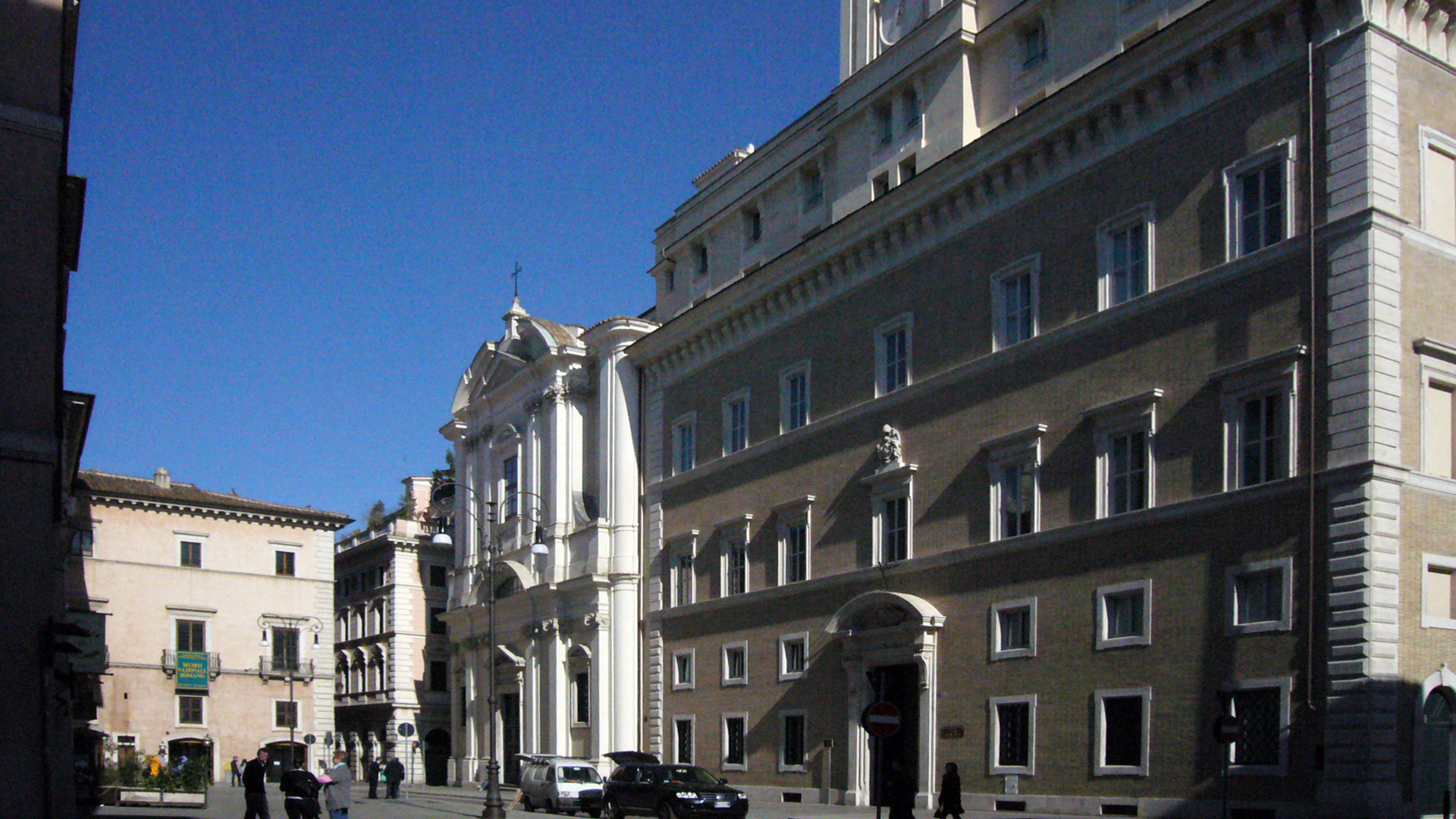
Palazzo di Sant'Apollinare (as main building) and the university church of the Pontifical University of Santa Croce

The Palazzo di Sant'Apollinare is a building on Piazza di Sant'Apollinare 49, Rome. It is named for Apollinaris of Ravenna. The palace (palazzo) is part of a large complex that has hosted a number of institutions, including Basilica di Sant'Apollinare, the Collegium Germanicum et Hungaricum, the Pontifical Roman Seminary, and the Pontifical Institute of Sant’Apollinare.

The Pontifical University of the Holy Cross is located in the Palazzo. Since its beginning in 1984, more than 7,000 students from 102 countries have passed through.

== History ==
In 1574 Gregory XIII granted the building to the Jesuits for the German College. The Hungarian College was added in 1580 to create the Collegium Germanicum et Hungaricum. The building adjoins Basilica di Sant'Apollinare and is located on Piazza di Sant'Apollinare near the famous Palazzo Farnese.

After the suppression of the Jesuits in 1773 they were dispossed until 1824, when Pope Leo XII returned this building to the Jesuits and transferred the seminary to the Palazzo di Sant'Apollinare; After the departure of the Jesuits in 1848 the seminary again removed to the Collegio Romano.
