= Manuel García Gil =

Spanish priest

His Eminence Manuel García Gil O.P.
- Archbishop of Zaragoza
- Church: Roman Catholic Church
- Archdiocese: Zaragoza
- See: Zaragoza
- Appointed: 23 December 1858
- Term ended: 28 April 1881
- Predecessor: Manuel María Gómez de las Rivas
- Successor: Francisco de Paula Benavides y Navarrete
- Other post: Cardinal-Priest of Santo Stefano al Monte Celio (1877-81)
- Previous post: Bishop of Badajoz (1853-58)

Orders
- Ordination: 10 March 1827
- Consecration: 23 April 1854 by Miguel García Cuesta
- Created cardinal: 12 March 1877 by Pope Pius IX
- Rank: Cardinal-Priest

Personal details
- Born: Manuel García Gil; 14 March 1802 San Salvador de Camba, Lugo, Spain
- Died: 28 April 1881 (aged 79) Zaragoza, Spain
- Motto: Ad Jesum per Mariam

Manuel García Gil (14 March 1802 - 28 April 1881) was a Spanish Roman Catholic cardinal and member from the Order of Preachers who served as the Archbishop of Zaragoza from 1858 until his death. He served prior to this as the Bishop of Badajoz and before that served as a professor in various Dominican houses. Pope Pius IX raised him to the cardinalate in 1877 as the Cardinal-Priest of Santo Stefano al Monte Celio.

== Life ==
Manuel García Gil was born on 14 March 1802.

He studied for the priesthood at the seminary in Lugo and entered the Order of Preachers while he was still a deacon at their convent in Lugo in 1826. He was ordained to the priesthood on 10 March 1827 and following this served as a professor of theology in the Dominican convents of Lugo and Santiago de Compostela. He also served as a professor and master of studies in the Dominican convent in Oviedo.

In late 1853 he was appointed as the Bishop of Badajoz and he received his episcopal consecration as a bishop in the Lugo Cathedral in 1854. In 1858 he was made the Archbishop of Zaragoza and shortly afterwards participated in the First Vatican Council. Pope Pius IX named him a cardinal in the consistory of 12 March 1877 as the Cardinal-Priest of Santo Stefano al Monte Celio; he later participated in the 1878 conclave that elected Pope Leo XIII.

He died in Zaragoza on 28 April 1881 and was buried in the archdiocesan cathedral.
