= István Szántó =

Hungarian Jesuit missionary and teacher

István Szántó (also known as István Arator; 1541–1612) was a Hungarian Jesuit missionary and teacher.

== Life ==
Szántó was born in 1541 in Diocese of Győr, Hungary. He was fifteen years old when his mother and three siblings were kidnapped by the Turks. He was then cared for by his uncle. In 1560, the Bishop of Nitra sent him to the German College in Rome. The following year, he applied to enter the Jesuits, and studied philosophy and theology at the Roman College.

In 1565 he was sent to Vienna, where he taught grammar and thence went as professor to a boarding school in Nagyszombat (now Trnava, Slovakia). He was ordained priest in 1566. The succeeding years were spent studying at the university of Vienna, where he lectured on philosophy. Szántó proved highly influential among his students, but was a bit overbearing in other contexts. In 1575 he was appointed the Hungarian confessor at St. Peter's Basilica.

His endeavours to found a Hungarian College in Rome after the model of the German College met with but temporary success. The monastery of the Hermits of St. Paul near Santo Stefano Rotondo on the Coelian was to serve for this purpose. The order had been founded by Eusebius of Esztergom; Santo Stefano served as the unofficial church of Hungarians in Rome. The deed of foundation was approved by Pope Gregory XIII, and the college was opened on 28 May 1579. The pope, however, soon united the college with the German College, because few Hungarian students were able to travel to Rome from the Turkish-occupied, Kingdom of Hungary.

At the end of 1579 Szántó left Rome, and proceeded to Transylvania, and the Catholic missions at Kolozsvár (now Cluj-Napoca, Romania); and later at Várad (now Oradea, Romania). He worked mainly as a religious debater and preacher. In 1580 he founded a college at Cluj. At this time occurred his literary polemics with the Protestant preacher Peter Beregszászi, against which he wrote his Epistola apologetica. Because of his outspoken, blunt character, he had many enemies among the Protestants, but he also got into heated arguments with his own comrades.

In 1585, Szántó proceeded to Gyulafehérvár (now Alba Iulia, Romania), and thence, on the expulsion of the Jesuit order from Transylvania; in 1590 he became head of the Jesuit house in Vágsellyto Vágsellye (now Šaľa, Slovakia). The following year, he went as a preacher to Znióvàralja (now Kláštor pod Znievom, Slovakia). He taught in Vienna from 1592–4, and thereafter worked as a Hungarian preacher and confessor. He was pastor in Turóc. The soldiers of Stephen Bocskai drove away the Jesuits, set the house on fire, and all its buildings were burned. He fled to Alamóc, where he began the translation of the Vulgate. He then moved to Olomouc, Moravia, where he wrote his memoirs. He died in Olomouc in 1612.

== Works ==
During the siege of Znióvàralja his books and manuscripts, including the Hungarian catechism which he composed in Rome, were lost; until his death, he was working on a translation of the New Testament, which may have been was used by György Káldy. Szántó must also be credited with the Hungarian portion of the dictionary of Calepino.
