= John Gibbons (Jesuit) =

English Jesuit theologian and controversialist

John Gibbons SJ (1544 – 1589) was an English Jesuit theologian and controversialist.

== Life ==
Gibbons was born in 1544, at or near Wells, Somerset. The Jesuit Richard Gibbons was his younger brother.

Gibbons entered Lincoln College, Oxford, in 1561, but left the university without a degree. After studying philosophy and theology for seven years in the German College in Rome, he obtained doctorates in both in 1576 and was ordained a Catholic priest.

Pope Gregory XIII gave Gibbons a canonry in the cathedral of the Archdiocese of Cologne, which was then located in Bonn, Germany. He resigned this post in 1578 on entering the Society of Jesus at Trier. In the college of this latter place he filled successively the offices of confessor, professor of theology, professor of Sacred Scripture, prefect of studies, and rector. He became known on account of his controversial talents, which he displayed in frequent contests with the Lutheran theologians of Germany.

When Cardinal William Allen suggested Gibbons as a fit candidate for the underground mission to the recusant Catholics of England, the latter wrote both to the Superior General of the Society and Allen, that he hoped he should give no disedification by saying that he had not the spiritual strength necessary for such an enterprise, but that he would lend it all the assistance in his power.

Gibbons died on 16 August or 3 December 1589, during a visit to Himmerod Abbey, near Trier.

== Works ==
Among Gibbon's literary works is Concertatio Ecclesiæ Catholicæ in Anglica, adversus Calvino-Papistas et Puritanos (Trier, 1583). The work was republished on a larger scale in 1588 and 1594, by John Bridgewater, who numbered among his assistants Cardinal Allen and Humphrey Ely.

Bridgewater also edited (see, however, Dictionary of National Biography, s. v.) a posthumous work of Gibbons entitled Confutatio virulentæ disputationis theologicæ in qua Georgius Sohn, Professor Academiæ Heidelburgensis, conatus est docere Pontificum Romanum esse Antichristum a prophgetis et apostolis prædictum (Trier, 1589), in which he dealt with the Calvinist attacks on the papacy.
