= Santo Stefano degli Ungheresi =

Church in Rome, Italy

Coordinates: 41°54′3.83″N 12°27′12.43″E

Santo Stefano degli Ungheresi (also San Stefanino and Santo Stefano degli Unni) was the church of the Hungarians in Rome. Located next to the Vatican, the old church was pulled down in 1778, to make room for an extension of St. Peter's Basilica.

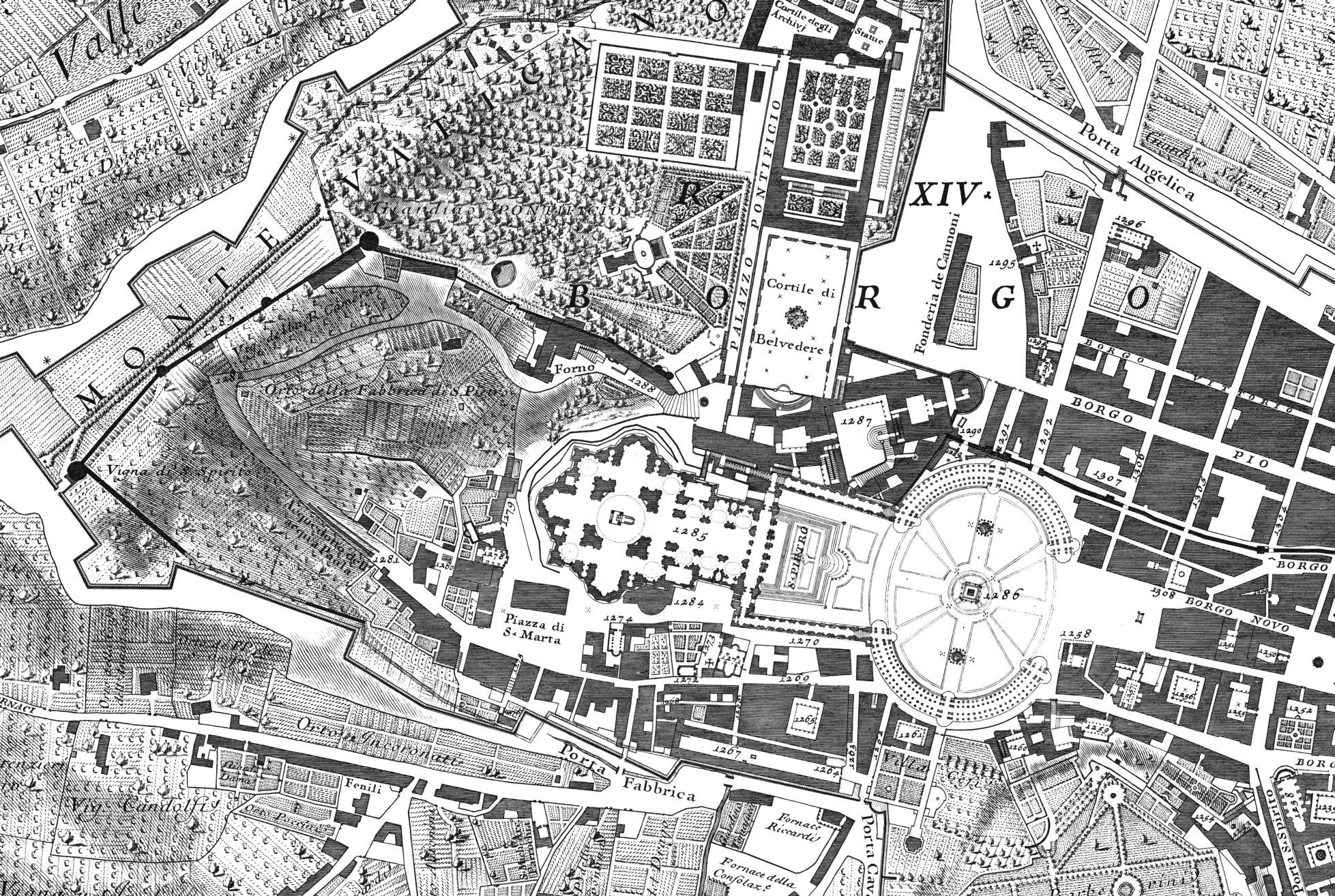
Churches in the Vatican City in 1748

1	Basilica of St. Peter
2	Saint Peregrinus in Vatican
3	Saint Anne
4	Santo Stefano degli Abissini

5	Santa Maria della Pietà
6	Saints Martin of the Swiss
7	San Salvatore in Ossibus

Demolished churches

9 / Santo Stefano degli Ungheresi	10 / Santa Marta

== Description ==
The church of Santo Stefano was established by Charlemagne in the 9th century. It was a basilical building with three naves. The eight granite columns supporting the roof were Roman spolia. The church was granted to King Stephen I in 1000 by Pope Sylvester II. The first Christian king of the Magyars received his crown from the Pope that year.

Stephen restored and enlarged the old building. He established a chapter house for twelve canons and a pilgrim's hostel for Hungarian travelers (predecessor of present-day Casa di Santo Stefano). The "Hungarian institutions", as they were called, played an important part in maintaining intensive diplomatic relations between medieval Hungary and the Holy See. They were also a place of learning for Hungarian clerics and intellectuals living in Rome.

Around the chapter house and the pilgrim's hostel, there were farm buildings like granaries, store-yards, and mills. The whole complex was surrounded by a wall.

The "Hungarian institutions" were sustained by the income of large estates in the vicinity of Rome. These estates, granted to Stephen I by the Pope, remained in the possession of the Kingdom of Hungary for hundreds of years. The last one in Celsano was only lost after World War II.

King Stephen I was canonized in 1083, and the church was dedicated to him under the name "Santo Stefano dei Ungheresi". It was restored by Sigismund of Luxemburg, King of Hungary, in the 15th century. Later, it was entrusted to the Pauline Fathers, the only monastical order founded by Hungarians.

In the 16th century, the nearby St. Peter's Basilica was rebuilt in Renaissance style and it was greatly enlarged. The Hungarian chapter house and the farm-buildings were pulled down to make way for the new basilica.

== Demolition ==
In 1778, Pope Pius VI built a new sacristy for St. Peter's and expropriated the old church of Santo Stefano. The Pope gave 7500 scudi for the Collegium Germanicum et Hungaricum as compensation for the loss. Hungarians lost their national church in Rome, but unofficially Santo Stefano Rotondo on Caelian Hill - whose titular is not King St. Stephen, but the latter's own patron saint - took over this role. Pius VI built a new chapel for St Stephen of Hungary there. Seven of the original Roman columns of the church were preserved in the new sacristy of St. Peter's.

A funerary altar of Titus Flavius Athenaeus was found in Santo Stefano degli Ungheresi and transferred to the Germanic-Hungarian College; it is now in the Uffizi.

== See also ==
- Index of Vatican City-related articles
