= Joint Interagency Task Force West =

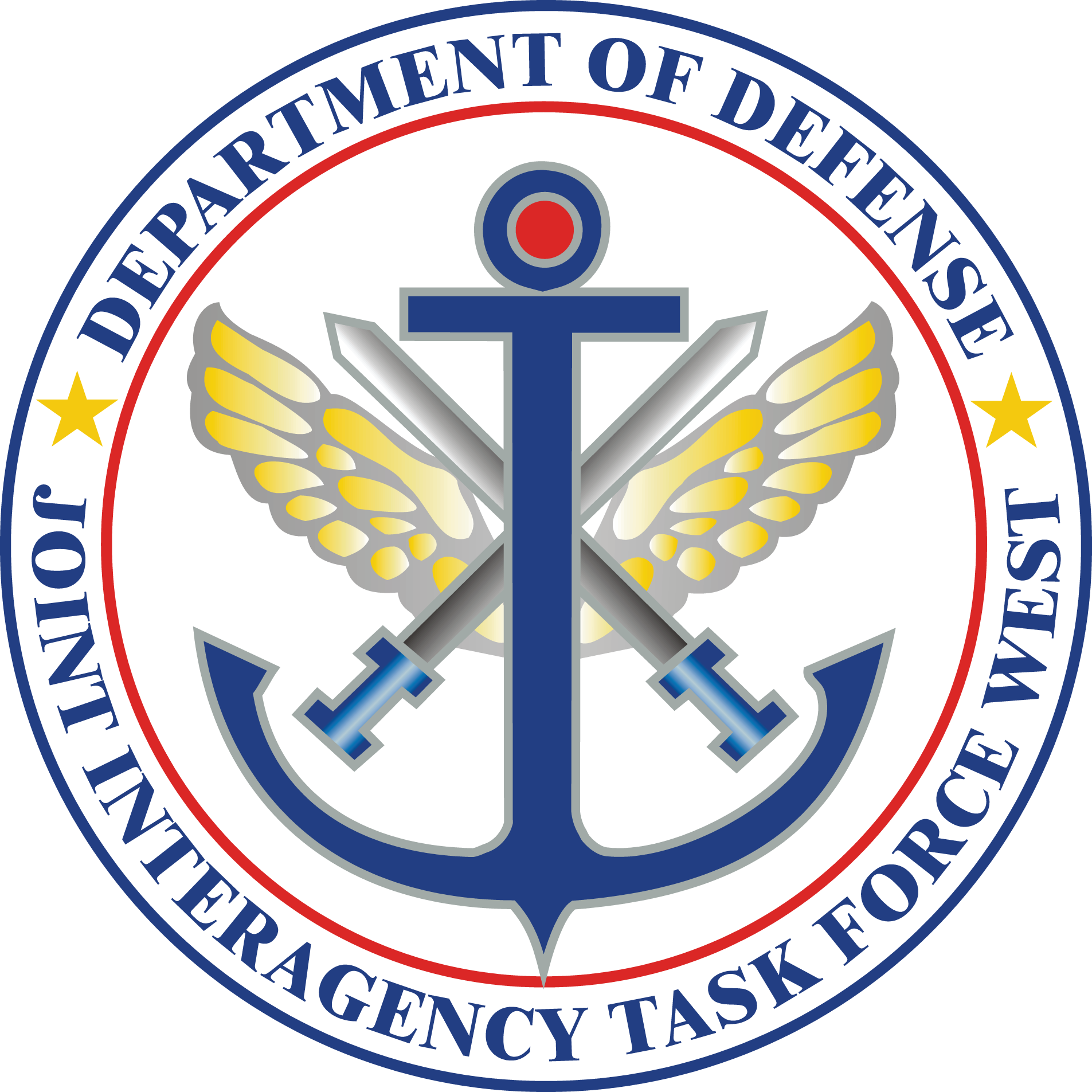
- Founded: 10 February 1989; 37 years ago
- Country: United States
- Type: Joint task force
- Headquarters: Camp H.M. Smith, Hawai'i
- Nicknames: JIATF West, JIATF-W
- Decorations: Joint Meritorious Unit Award (3)
- Website: http://www.pacom.mil/JIATFW.aspx

Commanders
- Director: Rear Admiral Bob Little, USCG
- Deputy Director: Mr. James J. Ink
- Chief of Staff: Captain Darrell W. Brown, USN

Joint Interagency Task Force West (JIATF-W or JIATF West) is a standing United States military joint task force with the mission of combating drug-related transnational organized crime in the Indo-Asia-Pacific. JIATF West's area of responsibility (AOR) is that of United States Pacific Command (USPACOM). JIATF West is one of two Joint Interagency Task Forces with a counter-narcotics mission. The other is Joint Interagency Task Force South. The task force is run as USINDOPACOM's "executive agent" for counterdrug activities providing support to partner nation law enforcement. Approximately 100 active duty and reserve U.S. military forces; Department of Defense civilian employees; contractors; and U.S. and foreign law enforcement agency personnel are members of the task force.

As part of the 2021 Defense Wide Review (DWR) JIATF West was slated for deactivation by FY23. The Senate Armed Services Committee raised concerns with the DWR decision, directing in their conference report of the FY20 NDAA the Secretary of Defense report not later than 180 days after enactment of the NDAA a plan for meeting those continuing roles and responsibilities in the USINDOPACOM AOR through either the continued operation of JIATF West or another mechanism. The committee noted, in part, “ . . . is concerned that the Department of Defense is planning to disestablish JIATF West by fiscal year 2023 . . . furthermore, the committee notes that pre-cursor chemicals used in the production of deadly drugs like synthetic heroin and methamphetamine that threaten the health and safety of American citizens and others around the world originate in and are trafficked from the Indo-Pacific Command area of responsibility.” In April 2022, Secretary of Defense Lloyd Austin signed a memorandum reversing the 2021 DWR decision to deactivate JIATF West.

The Bureau for International Narcotics and Law Enforcement Affairs of the United States Department of State describes the task force's mission as to "in cooperation with U.S. interagency and foreign partners, conduct activities to detect, disrupt, and dismantle drug-related transnational threats in Asia and the Pacific in order to protect U.S. security interests at home and abroad."

JIATF West lists its "task force partners" as including the U.S. Army, Navy, Marines, Air Force, and Coast Guard; the Drug Enforcement Administration (DEA), Defense Intelligence Agency (DIA), Federal Bureau of Investigation (FBI), National Geospatial Intelligence Agency (NGA), Naval Criminal Investigative Service (NCIS); United States Customs and Border Protection (CBP), United States Immigration and Customs Enforcement (ICE); and the Australian Customs Service, Australian Federal Police, and New Zealand Police.

The current Director of the Task Force as of 12 July 2023 is Rear Admiral Bob Little, USCG.

== Mission ==
Joint Interagency Task Force West executes Department of Defense counterdrug activities on behalf of Commander, U.S. Pacific Command to both defend the Homeland and stabilize the theater by hardening the environment against the growth of transnational crime and disrupting transnational criminal organizations that threaten U.S. interests.

== History ==
JIATF West was first established in 1989 as Joint Task Force-Five (JTF-5). Originally headquartered on Coast Guard Island in Alameda, California; JTF-5 was created under the National Defense Authorization Act for Fiscal Year 1989. Title 10 of the U.S. Code Section 124 was signed into law on 19 November 1989 establishing the Department of Defense as the lead agency for the Detection and Monitoring (D&M) of maritime and aerial drug trafficking into the United States directing the DoD to support of U.S. Law Enforcement counterdrug efforts. Additionally, Joint Task Forces Four (JTF-4), Five (JTF-5), and Six (JTF-6) were activated by the department in early calendar year 1989 to carry out this D&M mission. The mission of this group of task forces was soon expanded by Section 1004 of the 1991 National Defense Authorization Act to include ten additional specific categories of support that the department could provide to law enforcement agencies. This authority is in addition to the already assigned mission of D&M and has been continuously re-authorized since 1991.

On 3 November 1993 President Bill Clinton signed Presidential Decision Directive 14 (PDD-14); this prompted the eventual re-designation of all three JTF counterdrug units to become Joint Interagency Task Force units. On 7 April 1994 Director of the Office of National Drug Control Policy, Dr. Lee Brown, signed the National Interdiction Command and Control Plan (NICCP); re-designating JTF-5 in Alameda, CA, as Joint Interagency Task Force West with continued responsibility for the Pacific. JTF-4 was re-designated as JIATF East and given responsibility for the Caribbean (in 1999, JIATF East absorbed JIATF South missions which had been executed from US Southern Command in Quarry Heights Panama. In 2003, JIATF East was renamed JIATF South to reflect their status as a SOUTHCOM component). Joint Task Force 6 remained as JTF-6 and maintained responsibility for the Mexico – United States border

In 2004, JIATF West relocated to Camp H. M. Smith in Hawaii, collocating with Commander, United States Pacific Command. In addition to moving, JIATF West restructured and refocused its efforts from a D&M mission to one designed to support partner nation counterdrug law enforcement efforts against transnational crime.

== Counter-drug focus ==
JIATF West's primary counterdrug focus is on stopping the illicit use of precursor chemicals used to manufacture methamphetamine and amphetamine type stimulants (ATS). The illicit use of precursor chemicals is viewed as a double threat, one from the devastating social impact of drug addiction and the second from the funding of terrorism. According to the testimony of Adm. Samuel J. Locklear, USN, before the Senate Armed Services Committee on 16 April 2015, transnational criminal organizations operating as global enterprises use the revenue generated from the illicit activities of drug trafficking to fund terrorist and violent extremist organizations.

Since 2009, JIATF West has assisted in seizing over 1,500 tons of precursor chemicals. According to the U.S. Drug Enforcement Administration in 2012, 80 percent of the meth in the United States is made in Mexico mainly using ingredients manufactured in China and shipped across the Pacific.

The 2015 National Drug Control Strategy (NDCS) section 6.1.D. “Coordinate with Global Partners to Prevent Synthetic Drug Production and Precursor Chemical Diversion” describes how access to precursor chemicals continues to challenge the U.S. and international drug efforts, and that JIATF West, with interagency partners such as the DEA, will to continue to help track precursor chemical shipments and to help increase law enforcement's understanding of the movement of the chemicals.

== Authorities ==
The origin of authorities that allow a military organization to assist law enforcement in counterdrug operations dates to 1 December 1981 when Congress added section 371 to Title 10 of the United States Code, allowing the military to share with law enforcement officials any information collected during normal operations that may be relevant to violations of federal or state law. Prior to this, the Posse Comitatus Act of 1878 prevented the use of federal military personnel to enforce domestic policies.

The next major change came from the National Defense Authorization Act (NDAA) of 1988–1989, signed on 4 December 1987, this included language that added section 380 under title 10, for the enhancement of cooperation with civilian law enforcement officials.

″The Secretary of Defense shall submit to Congress a report containing the following: A detailed list of all forms of assistance under this chapter that is proposed to be made available by the Department of Defense to civilian drug law enforcement and drug interdiction agencies (including the United States Customs Service, the Coast Guard, the Drug Enforcement Administration, and the Immigration and Naturalization Service".

The authority to perform detection and monitoring (D&M) of aerial and maritime transit of illegal drugs into the United States was granted when congress passed the NDAA for FY 1990–1991 on 29 November 1989 designating the Department of Defense as the single lead agency of the Federal Government for D&M.

The NDAA of FY 1990-1991 amended section 1004 providing additional support for counterdrug activities and activities to counter transnational organized crime.

″The establishment (including an unspecified minor military construction project) and operation of bases of operations or training facilities for the purpose of facilitating counter-drug activities or activities to counter transnational organized crime of the Department of Defense or any Federal, State, local, or tribal law enforcement agency within or outside the United States or for the purpose of facilitating counter-drug activities or activities to counter transnational organized crime of a foreign law enforcement agency outside the United States.″

The NDAA of FY 2004 amended title 10 section 1022 allowing the DoD to support counter terrorism activities in addition to counterdrug efforts.

The NDAA of FY 2015 amended section 1022 of the NDAA of FY 2004 (Public Law 108-136) to ″Expand the scope of the Department of Defense (DOD) authority to provide support to U.S. law enforcement agencies for counterterrorism purposes when a nexus exists between drug trafficking or transnational organized crime (TOC) and a foreign terrorist organization″.

The NDAA of FY 2015 amended section 1004 of the NDAA for FY 1991 (Public Law 101-510) to ″Authorize the Department of Defense (DOD) to provide additional support for activities of other governmental agencies to counter transnational organized crime (TOC) in addition to its counterdrug activities".

== Area of Responsibility ==
According to a Department of Defense Memorandum for Director, Joint Staff, dated 21 August 2003, the JIATF West AOR was to mirror that of USINDOPACOM's effective 1 October 2003 (with the exception of overlapping areas covered by JIATF South). The National Interdiction Command and Control Plan published by the Office of National Drug Control Policy's United States Interdiction Coordinator, likewise describes the AOR of JIATF West as that of USINDOPACOM.

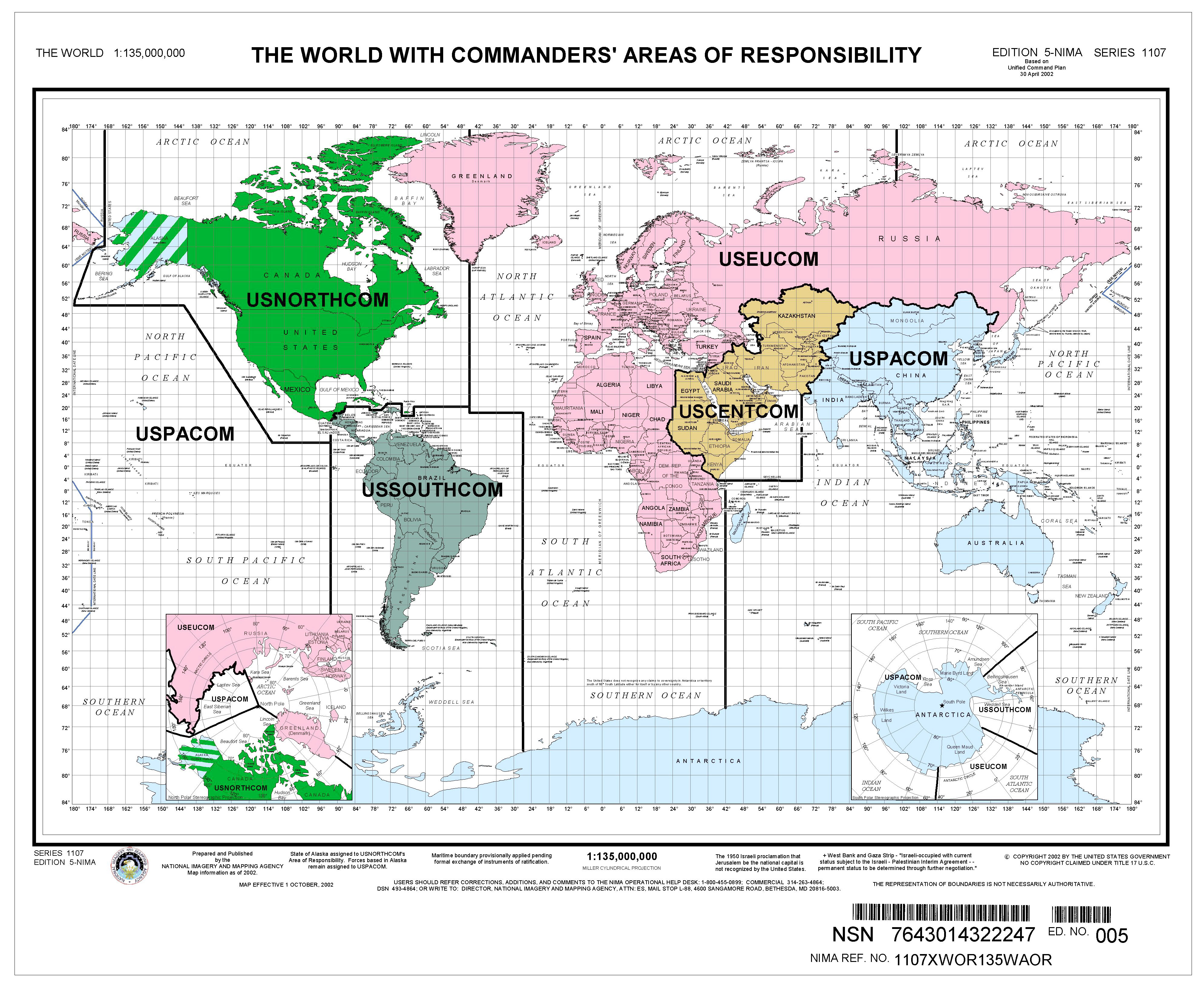
Map of The World With Commanders' Areas of Responsibilities

As one of nine unified commands (UCC) of the United States military, USINDOPACOM has an AOR defined by the Department of Defense's Unified Command Plan. For USINDOPACOM it consists of 36 nations in the Indo-Asia-Pacific containing 50% of the world's population.

The AOR map indicates that the AOR for USINDOPACOM, and therefore that of JIATF West, lies within the Pacific Ocean from Antarctica at 092" W, north to 08° N, west to 112° W, northwest to 50° N/142' W, west to 170' E, north to 53° N, northeast to 65'30' N/169' W, north to 90' N, the Arctic Ocean west of 169" W and east of 100" E; including many countries in Asia, Southeast Asia to the India/Pakistan coastal border west to 06S"E, and south along 068"E to Antarctica; Australia, New Zealand, Antarctica, and Hawaii.

== Department of State ==
Acting Assistant Secretary for East Asian and Pacific Affairs Susan Thornton's participation in the Pacific Islands Forum's (PIF) Forum Dialogue Partners (FDP) meeting, leading an interagency U.S. delegation, reflects sustained United States commitment to the region and our Pacific Islands partners.

Supporting Information Sharing: Based at the U.S. Pacific Command in Honolulu, the Joint Interagency Task Force West (JIATF-West) brings together military and law enforcement capabilities across the U.S. federal government and partners closely with the Pacific Transnational Crime Network (PTCN), the regional network of Pacific Islands law enforcement organizations. Over the past several years, JIATF-West has funded and supported the transition of PTCN to a new information sharing platform, the All Partners Access Network (APAN). JIATF-West is providing ground support for the next PTCN event to be held in Honolulu in early November, funded by the Australian Federal Police.

== Historical list of directors ==
No.	Photo	Director	Tenure
1.		RADM William P. Leahy, USCG	10 February 1989 – 30 April 1991
2.		RADM John L. Linnon, USCG	1 May 1991 – 6 April 1994
3.	VADM Martin H. Daniell	VADM Martin H. Daniell Jr., USCG	7 April – 30 June 1994
4.	RADM Richard Herr	VADM Richard D. Herr, USCG	1 July 1994 – 9 November 1994
5.		RADM John T. Tozzi, USCG	10 November 1994 – 26 June 1996
6.		RADM Joseph J. McClelland, Jr., USCG	27 June 1996 – 12 June 1998
7.		RADM David S. Belz, USCG	13 June 1998 – 8 June 2000
8.		RADM James C. Olson, USCG	9 June 2000 – 6 June 2002
9.		RADM David W. Kunkel, USCG	7 June 2002 – 16 July 2004
10.		RADM Richard R. Kelly, USCG	17 July 2004 – 25 August 2006
11.	VADM Brice-OHara USCG	RADM Sally Brice-O′Hara, USCG	26 August 2006 – 8 November 2006
12.	VADM Paul F Zukunft, USCG	RADM Paul F. Zukunft, USCG	9 November 2006 – 31 July 2008
13.	RADM Steve H Ratti, USCG	RADM Steven H. Ratti, USCG	1 August 2008 – 29 March 2010
14.	RADM Christopher J Tomney, USCG	RADM Christopher Tomney, USCG	30 March 2010 – 26 April 2012
15.	RADM James E Rendon, USCG	RDML James E. Rendon, USCG	27 April 2012 – 20 May 2015
16.	RADM Keith M Smith, USCG	RDML Keith M. Smith, USCG	21 May 2015 – 30 March 2017
17.	RADM Donna L Cottrell, USCG	RDML Donna L. Cottrell, USCG	31 March 2017 – 12 April 2019
18.	RADM Robert P Hayes, USCG	RADM Robert P. Hayes, USCG	12 April 2019 – 25 June 2021
19.		RDML Charles E. Fosse, USCG	25 June 2021 – 12 July 2023
20.		RDML Ralph R. Little, USCG	12 July 2023 – present
