= Annibale Orgas =

Italian composer

Annibale Orgas (c. 1585–1629) was an Italian composer. He was first a boy soprano at the Collegium Germanicum, then from 1607 to 1610 trained to be a deacon at the Seminario Romano. He returned to the Collegium as maestro di cappella, in Rome, and then in 1619 left Italy to take up the post of maestro di cappella at Wawel Cathedral, Kraków.

== Works, editions and recordings ==
- Sacrarum cantionum liber primus (though there never was a second book) Venice 1619
- Recording of motet Omnes Gentes by St John's College, Cambridge conductor George Guest
