= Steven H. Ratti =

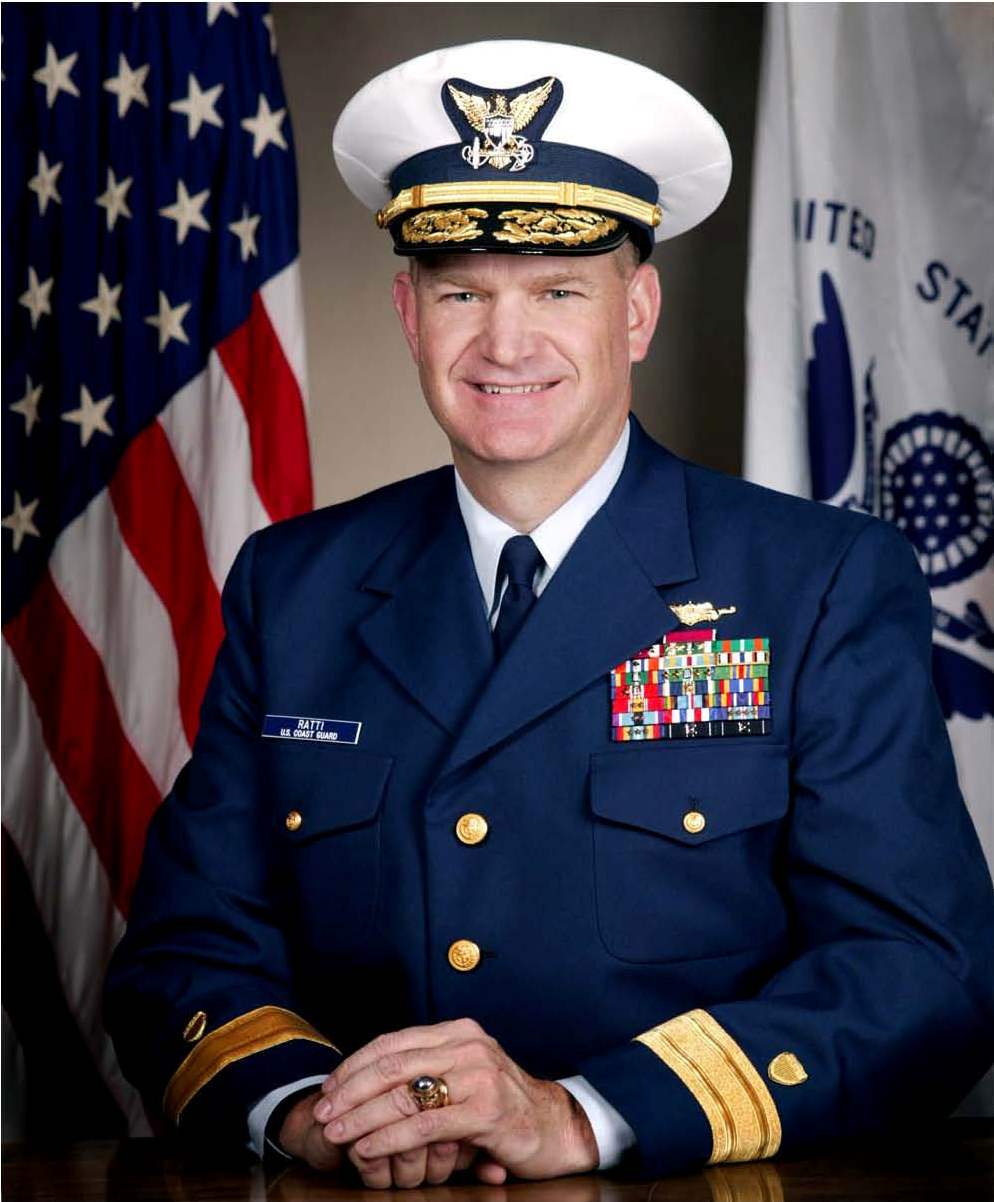
- Ratti in the late 2000s
- Born: 1956 (age 69–70)
- Military career
- Allegiance: United States of America
- Branch: United States Coast Guard
- Service years: 1978–2014
- Rank: Rear admiral
- Commands: Joint Interagency Task Force West
- Awards: USCG Distinguished Service Medal; Legion of Merit; Meritorious Service Medal; USCG Commendation Medal; Humanitarian Service Medal

Steven Holland Ratti (born 1956) is a former United States Coast Guard admiral. He is the son of retired U.S. Coast Guard officer Rear Admiral Ricardo Ratti, who was born in 1922 and is a member of the USCGA Class of 1944. They are the only Coast Guard Academy graduate father and son pair to reach the rank of rear admiral in the U.S. Coast Guard.

== Early life and education ==
Ratti graduated from the United States Coast Guard Academy in 1978, with a Bachelor of Science degree in economics and management. Ratti also served as a company officer at the United States Coast Guard Academy. He also holds a Master of Science in human resources management from Rensselaer Polytechnic Institute and a Master of Science in instructional technology from Florida State University.

== Career ==
Ratti served as commanding officer of four Coast Guard cutters: USCGC Point Hope, USCGC Sapelo, USCGC Thetis, and USCGC Jarvis.

Ratti's final assignment was as the Commander of the Fifth Coast Guard District in Portsmouth, Virginia, from May 2012 to June 2014. Ratti was the Director of Operations, J3 for the United States Southern Command, from April 2010 to May 2012. From July 2008 to April 2010, Ratti served as director of the Joint Interagency Task Force West at the United States Pacific Command, with responsibility for planning and implementing counter-drug strategy in the Asia Pacific region.

== Awards and decorations ==
Ratti has been awarded the following, along with numerous unit, service and campaign awards:

- Defense Superior Service Medal
- Legion of Merit (two awards)
- Meritorious Service Medal (four awards)
- Coast Guard Commendation Medal (four awards)
- Coast Guard Achievement Medal

== Notes ==
Citations

References used

- "For 3 Generations, Coast Guard a Family Affair". The Washington Times. Washington, D.C. 18 October 2014.
- "Rear Admiral Steven H. Ratti" (PDF). Coast Guard Flag Biographies. U.S. Coast Guard Historian's Office.
