= Collegium Germanicum et Hungaricum =

Catholic seminary in Rome, Italy

Coordinates: 41°54′17.94″N 12°29′30.69″E

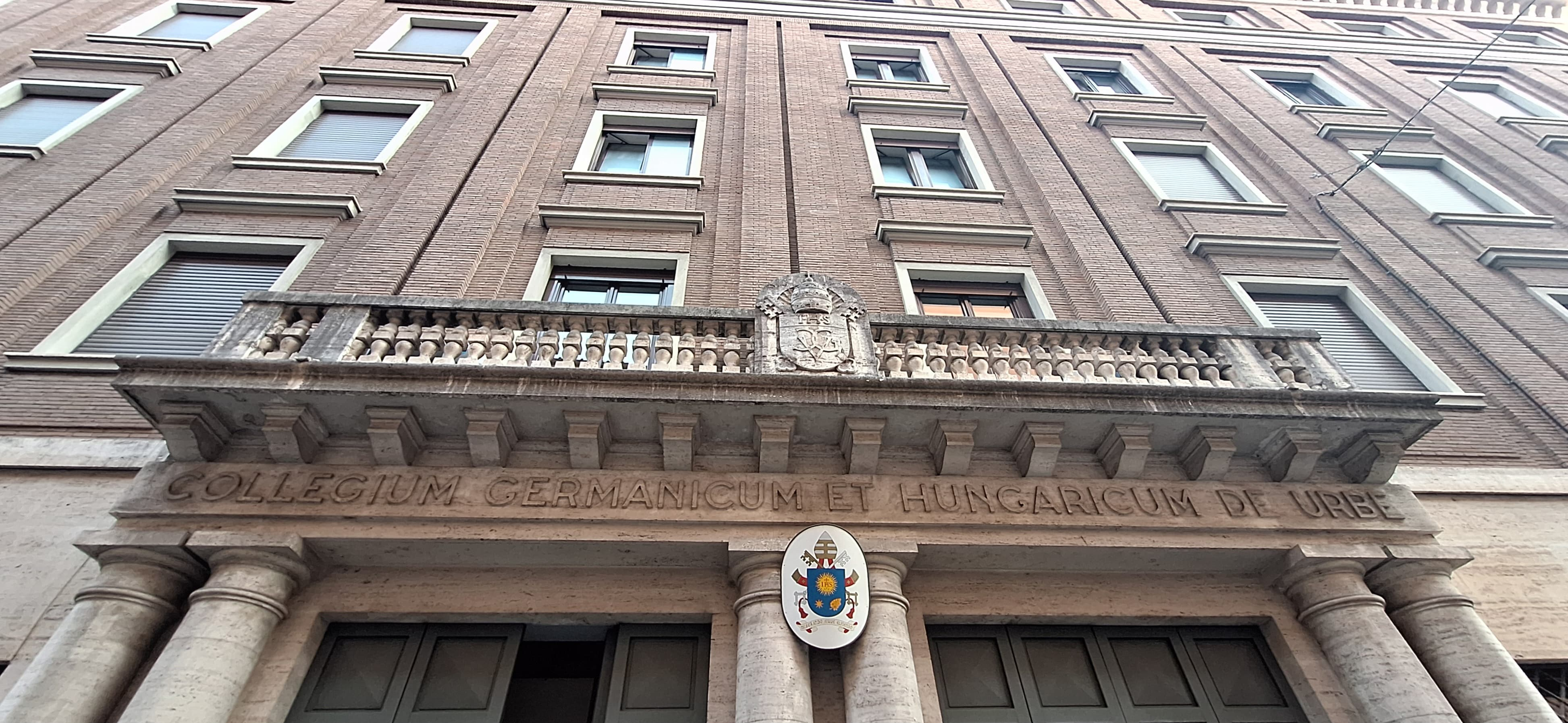
Building of Collegium Germanicum et Hungaricum.

The Collegium Germanicum et Hungaricum, or simply Collegium Germanicum, is a German-speaking seminary for Catholic priests in Rome, founded in 1552. Since 1580 its full name has been Pontificium Collegium Germanicum et Hungaricum de Urbe. It is located on the Via di San Nicola da Tolentino.

== History ==
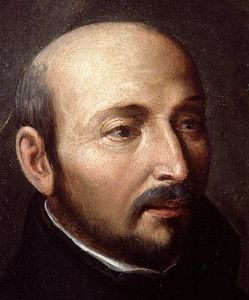
Ignatius Loyola, co-founder of the college.

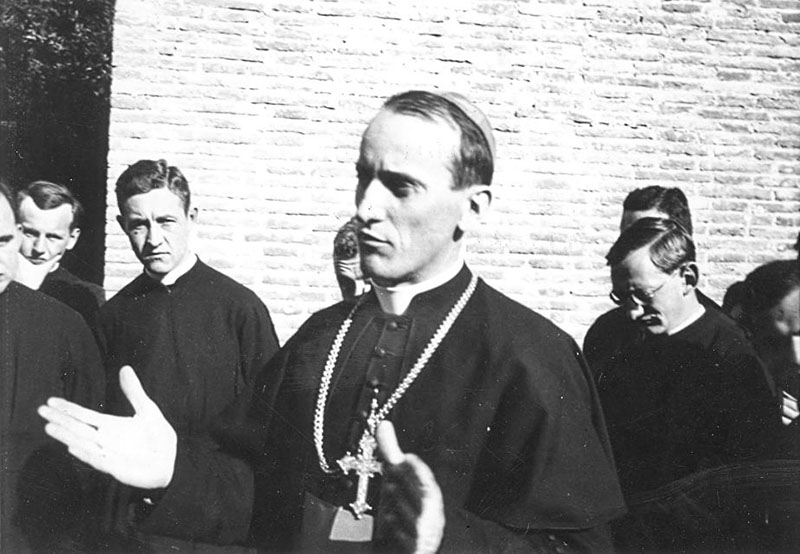
Alojzije Stepinac at Germanicum in 1935

It was apparent to the Roman Curia that the advance of the Reformation in the Holy Roman Empire would not be addressed by a reform of the clergy in the empire itself. The Collegium Germanicum was established on 31 August 1552 by Pope Julius III with the bull Dum sollicita.

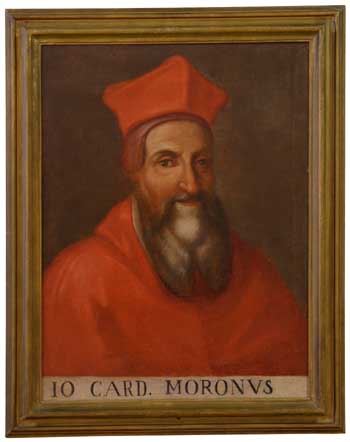
Giovanni Morone, co-founder of the college.

The initiative towards its foundation was taken by Cardinal Giovanni Morone and Ignatius Loyola. Pope Julius III approved of the idea and promised his aid, but for a long time the college had to struggle against financial difficulties. Ignatius formally opened it on 28 October and the direction of the college was given to the order he founded 12 years earlier - the Society of Jesus ("Jesuits"). After the Almo Collegio Capranica, this is the oldest college in Rome. It opened in October 1552.

The administration was confided to a committee of six Cardinal Protectors, who decided that the collegians should wear a red cassock, in consequence of which they have since been popularly known as the "boiled shrimps".

During the first year the higher courses were given in the college itself; but in the autumn of 1553 St. Ignatius succeeded in establishing the schools of philosophy and theology in the Collegio Romano of his Society. He also drew up the first rules for the college, which served as models for similar institutions. During the pontificate of Pope Paul IV the financial conditions became such that the students had to be distributed among the various colleges of the Society in Italy. To place the institution on a firmer basis it was decided to admit paying boarders regardless their nationality, and without the obligation of embracing the ecclesiastical state; German clerics to the number of 20 or more were received free and formed a separate body. In a short time 200 boarding students, all belonging to the flower of European nobility, were received. Pope Pius V placed 20 of his nephews in the college.

Pope Gregory XIII, however, may be considered the real founder of the college. He transferred the secular department to the Seminario Romano, and in 1573 endowed the college with the Abbey of S. Saba all' Aventino and all its possessions, both on the Via Portuense and on Lake Bracciano; moreover he incorporated with it the Abbeys of Fonte Avellana in the Marches, S. Cristina, and Lodiveccio in Lombardy. This allowed the practice of free education to be maintained. The new rector P. Lauretano, drew up another set of regulations.

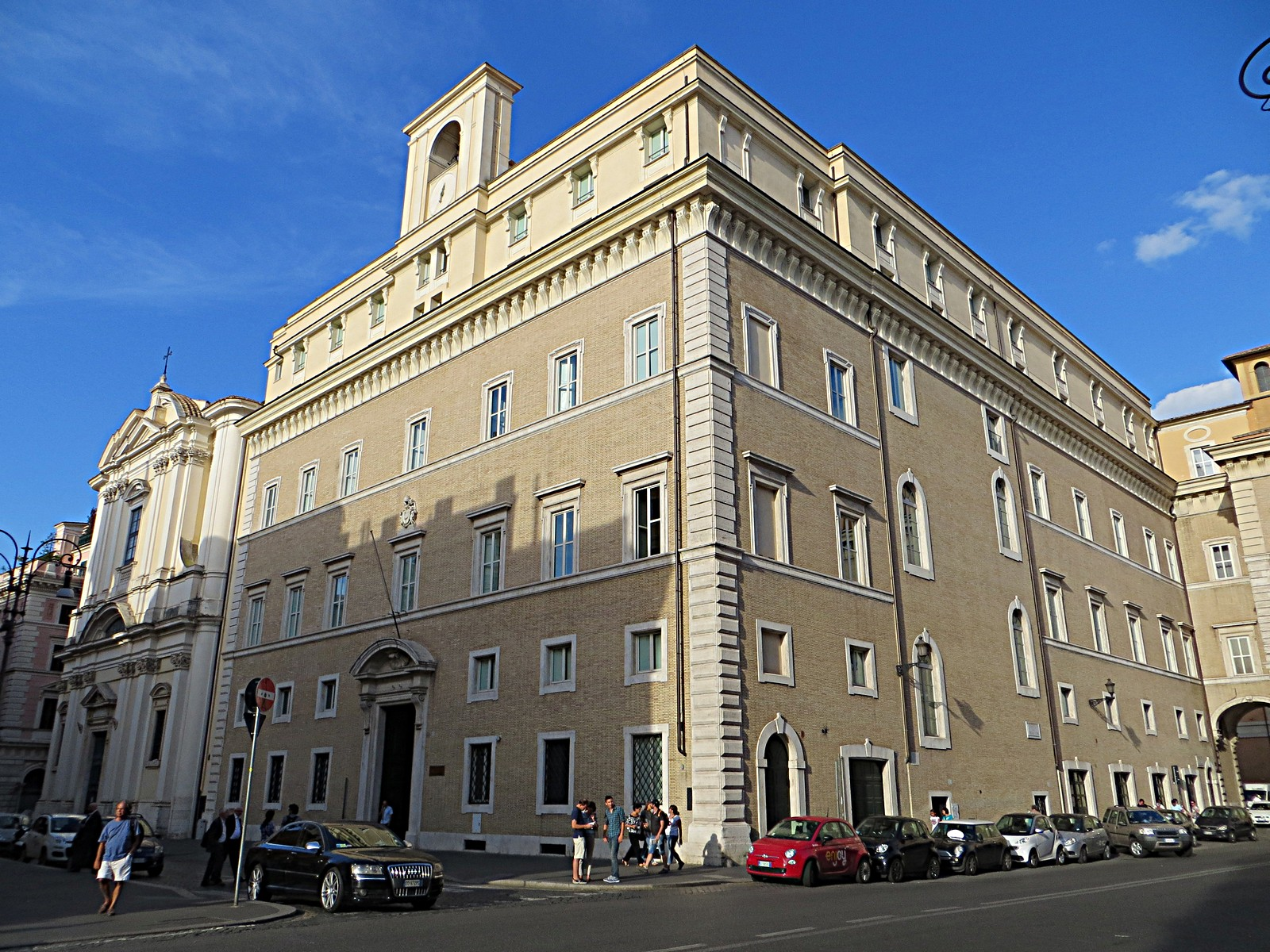
Seat until 1798.

The college had already changed its location five times. In 1574 Pope Gregory XIII assigned it the Palazzi di S. Apollinare (the current seats of the Domus Internationalis Paulus VI and the Pontifical University of the Holy Cross), and in 1575 gave it charge of the services in the adjoining church. The splendour and majesty of the functions as well as the music executed by the students under the Spaniard Tomás Luis de Victoria, and his successor Annibale Stabile and other celebrated masters (Annibale Orgas, Lorenzo Ratti, Giacomo Carissimi, Ottavio Pittoni, and others) constantly drew large crowds to the church. Too much attention indeed was given to music under P. Lauretano, so that regulations had to be made at various times to prevent the academic work of the students from suffering. The courses were still given in the Collegio Romano; but when Bellarmine terminated his lectures on controversy, a chair for this important branch of learning was established in the Collegio Germanico and somewhat later a chair of canon law. As a special mark of his favour, Gregory XIII ordered that each year on the Feast of All Saints a student of the college should deliver a panegyric in presence of the pope.

Meanwhile, in 1578 the Collegio Ungherese had been founded through the efforts of another Jesuit, Stephan Szántó, who obtained for it the church and convent of S. Stefano Rotondo on the Caelian Hill, and of S. Stefanino behind St. Peter's Basilica, the former belonging to the Hungarian Pauline monks, and the latter to the Hungarian pilgrims' hospice. In 1580 Pope Gregory XIII merged it with the Collegium Hungaricum ("Hungarian College"), founded in 1578, since when it has been called the Pontificium Collegium Germanicum et Hungaricum de Urbe, or the Collegium Germanicum et Hungaricum for short. The students generally numbered about 100, sometimes, however, there were but 54, at other times as many as 150.

During the seventeenth century several changes occurred, in particular the new form of oath exacted from all the students of foreign colleges. Mention must be made of the work of P. Galeno, the business manager who succeeded in consolidating the finances of the college so as to raise the revenue to 25,000 scudi per annum. A country residence was acquired at Parioli. In the eighteenth century the college became gradually more aristocratic. Pope Benedict XIV performed the ceremony of laying the cornerstone of the new church of S. Apollinare in 1742, on the completion of which a new Palace of S. Apollinare was erected. At the suppression of the Society (1773) the direction was entrusted to secular priests; lectures were delivered in the college itself, and the professors were Dominicans. Discipline and studies declined rapidly. Moreover, Emperor Joseph II sequestrated the property situated in Lombardy and forbade his subjects to attend the college. The buildings, however, were increased by the addition of the palace opposite to S. Agostino.

After Emperor Joseph II in 1781 forbade all students of his realm to study in Rome, and the city was shortly afterwards occupied by French troops, the college was obliged to close in 1798. It was reopened under Pope Pius VII in 1818, and reorganised by Pope Leo XII, who strengthened its connection to the Jesuits and gave it the form which it still has today.

On the proclamation of the Roman Republic the property of the foreign national colleges was declared escheated to the Government and was sold for an absurdly small sum. On that occasion the library and the precious archives of sacred music were scattered. Pius VII restored whatever remained unsold and ordered the rest to be repurchased as far as possible. In the first years the revenues were employed to pay off the debts contracted in this repurchase. In 1824 the palace of S. Apollinare as well as the villa at Parioli was reunited to the Seminario Romano. The first students were received in 1818 and lived in the professed house of the Jesuits at the Gesu, and there the college remained till 1851. From that time the administration was entrusted to the general of the Jesuits, who appointed the rector and other fathers in charge of the college. In 1845 the estate of S. Pastore near Zagarolo was acquired. In 1851 the residence was transferred to the Palazzo Borromeo in the Via del Seminario where it remained till 1886. In 1873 when the Collegio Romano was taken away from the Jesuits, the Collegio Germanico found a home in the Gregorian University.

In 1886 owing to the necessity of having more extensive quarters, the Collegio Germanico was transferred to the Hotel Costanzi in the Via S. Nicola da Tolentino. During World War I the members of the college had to move to share the premises of the Collegium Canisianum in Innsbruck from 1915 to 1919.

== Present day ==
The Hotel Costanzi was torn down in 1939 to make way for road construction. The present college was built in 1944.

The leadership of the Germanicum and Hungaricum collegiums is entrusted to the Jesuit order, with the rector and three other priests belonging to the Jesuit community. Two Croatian nuns are also part of the household.

The college receives students from Scandinavia, from the old German Empire and from the old Hungarian kingdom; places are free, but there are some students who pay. They study at the Pontifical Gregorian University (for bachelors’ degrees) and at various pontifical universities in Rome for their licentiate and doctorate. The “official” language of the College is German and all of them study Italian, to be able to follow the courses conducted in Italian. After receiving their bachelor’s degree, they return to their diocese for to a "pastoral year".

It is customary for college community to make the pilgrimage to the Seven Churches on a Sunday in Lent.

== Teaching ==
At its foundation the defence against the Reformation, improvement of theological training and the education of priests loyal to Rome were the principal aims. "From the territories, endangered in faith, of the Holy Roman Empire of the German nation" were to be trained "fearless warriors for the faith" (quotations from the founding bull). After the fall of the Iron Curtain in 1989 it was possible to restore the original internationalism of the college.

== Saints and Blesseds ==
The college commemorates some saints and blessed who have a special relationship with the college or were alumni.

- Rodolfo Acquaviva, missionary
- Peter Canisius
- Ignatius of Loyola
- Robert Johnson
- Marko Krizin
- Primus and Felician
- Theodore Romzha, bishop and martyr
- Aloysius Stepinac, cardinal
- Saint Stephen

== Known students ==
- Béla H. Bánáthy
- Barkóczy Ferenc (érsek) bishop of Eger
- Hieronymus von Colloredo, Prince-Archbishop of Salzburg
- Friedrich Dörr, German priest, professor and hymnwriter
- Marcin Dunin
- Jean-Baptiste Fallize, first Vicar Apostolic of Norway
- Alexander Frison
- John Gibbons
- Gerhard Gruber
- Joseph Höffner
- Hugo Hurter
- Benedict Kishdy, bishop of Eger
- György Klimó, later bishop of Pécs, Hungary
- József Koller, canon in Pécs, Hungary
- Kurt Krenn
- St. Marko Krizin
- Hans Küng
- Karl Lehmann, cardinal
- Heinrich Maier, important Austrian resistance fighter against National Socialism
- Johann Maier, executed by Nazis
- Johann Michael Raich
- Karl-August von Reisach
- Blessed Theodore Romzha, Bishop of Mukachevo, Martyred by Nikita Khrushchev and Joseph Stalin.
- Franz-Josef Overbeck, bishop of Essen, Germany
- Andreas Steinhuber, cardinal
- Franjo Šeper, Cardinal and Prefect of the Congregation for the Doctrine of the Faith
- Bela Tonković
- Friedrich Wetter, cardinal
- Tomás Luis de Victoria, Spanish composer

== See also ==
- Pontifical Gregorian University, formerly Collegium Romanum
- University of Olomouc, by which Collegium Nordicum was established in 1578
- Francis Xavier Patrizi, a Jesuit teacher of the college
- List of Jesuit sites

== Sources ==
- Dachsberger, Johann and Leiber, Robert, 1934. Kollegien in Lexikon für Theologie und Kirche, 1st edition. vol. 6. Freiburg im Breisgau: Herder.
- Schmidt, Peter, 1984. Das Collegium Germanicum in Rom und die Germaniker. Zur Funktion e. röm. Ausländerseminars (1552 - 1914). Tübingen: Niemeyer. ISBN 3-484-82056-X
- Leitgöb, Martin, 2004. Vom Seelenhirten zum Wegführer. Sondierungen zum bischöflichen Selbstverständnis im 19. und 20. Jahrhundert. Die Germanikerbischöfe 1837-1962. Rome: Herder. ISBN 3-451-26458-7
- Maurizio Tani: La rinascita culturale del '700 ungherese: le arti figurative nella grande committenza ecclesiastica, Gregorian University Press / Biblical BookShop, Rom 2005, ISBN 9788878390188
- Dimić, Ljubodrag (2018). "Alojzije Stepinac: Student of the Collegium Germanicum (1924-1931)" (PDF). Токови историје (3): 11–32.
