= Lorenzo Ratti =

Italian baroque composer

- Died: 1630
- Occupation: composer
- Employer(s): San Luigi dei Francesi, Collegio Teutonico
- Movement: Baroque
- Relatives: Vincenzo Ugolini (uncle)

Lorenzo Ratti (c. 1589–1630) was an Italian baroque composer originating from Perugia. His uncle and teacher was Vincenzo Ugolini. He was the predecessor of Giacomo Carissimi at the Collegium Germanicum and a teacher of Orazio Benevoli.

== Biography ==
Ratti's exact place and date of birth is unclear. He was born around 1589 or 1590 to Girolamo and Isapaola Ugolini. Some sources, such as Belgian musicologist François-Joseph Fétis, point to a village called Loreto in the surrounding of Naples as his place of birth, but German musicologist Robert Eitner claims Perugia to be Ratti's place of birth.

He was first mentioned in 1598–1599 as a boy soprano of the Cappella Giulia of St. Peter's Basilica in Rome and later was its third organist. For a short time he was the first organist of the Perugia Cathedral (1613–1616). Returning to Rome, he became the music director of several ensembles. His best known jobs were at the San Luigi dei Francesi as the teacher of Orazio Benevoli and as music director at the Collegium Germanicum at S. Loreto. Later, he succeeded Antonio Cifra as the director of music at Santa Casa in Loreto.

Ratti is believed to have died in 1630, but sheet of music from 1632 purportedly signed by him has cast doubt on this.

== Works, editions and recordings ==
He composed a number of sacral works. Well known are his six Gospel Dialogues for the oratory. He is claimed to have composed 157 motets. Furthermore, he created a so-called dramma harmonico:

- Missa Zacharia a 16
- 6 Dialogues for the Oratory
- Sacrae modulationes 1628
- Il Ciclope overo Della vendetta d’Apolline

Eitner also mentioned several works, including their state of conservation and their location (partly translated and shortened):

- Motecta 2, 3, 4 et 5 voc. lib. 1.; Roma 1617 Zanetti., Caecilia in Rome complete. B. B: C 1. 2. B.
- Sacrae Modulationes nunc primum in lucem editae Pars I./II., (not complete), Bologna, Kremsmünster, 1628 Aless. Vincentius
- Litaniae beatiss. V. M. 5, 6, 7, 8 et 12 voc. una c. B. ad org. Ven. 1630 Aless. Vincentius
- Cantica Salomonis. Binis, ternis, 4nis, acquinis vocibus concinenda. 1632
- Di Lorenzo R... nepote e discepolo di Vinc. Ugolini. Il 1. lib. de Madrigali a 5 voci, 1615 G. Vincenti. Neapel.
- Alfieri, Bd.2, S. 65. Jesu cordis solatium 5 voc.
- O Domine Jesu Christe, (2 copies) .
- Cap. lat.: Missa sine nom. a 4 cori (4 Org. u. 4 voci per coro).
- Cap. sistina, Cod. 220, Ecce panis angelicus 5 voc.
- Kremsmünster, Cod. Lechler "einige Tonsätze" (= "some compositions").
- "In alten Samlwk. im Druck" ('collection to be printed'): In Dom. Bianchi's Sacrarum modulat. 1642: Transfige. — In Sammaruco's Sacri affetti 1625: Salve virgo sacra parens 4 voc. concert.
